= 1951 in Israel =

- Decades: 1930s; 1940s; 1950s; 1960s; 1970s
- See also: History of Israel; Timeline of Israeli history; List of years in Israel

Events in the year 1951 in Israel.

== Incumbents ==
- Prime Minister of Israel – David Ben-Gurion (Mapai)
- President of Israel – Chaim Weizmann
- President of the Supreme Court – Moshe Smoira
- Chief of General Staff – Yigal Yadin
- Government of Israel – 2nd Government of Israel until 24 December, 3rd Government of Israel

== Events ==
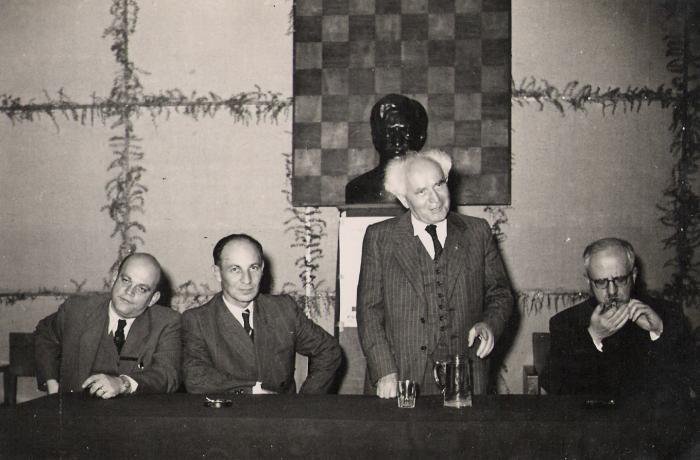
David Ben-Gurion at the opening ceremony of the first Israeli Chess Championship, 1951.

- 1 January – The Tel Aviv Stock Exchange commences operating.
- 4 January – Minister of Religious Affairs, Rabbi Yehuda Leib Maimon, resigns from the government over the crisis in education in the ma'abarot.
- 6 February – An Israeli platoon attacks Sharafat killing nine, including 3 women and five children.
- 13 March – Israel disclosed a demand for 6.2 billion Deutsche Mark ($1.5 billion US dollars) for Jewish property confiscated and plundered by the Germans during the Nazi regime. The German reparations would be used to resettle the 500,000 Jewish war refugees whom immigrated to Israel from countries formerly under the Nazi regime.
- 4 April – El-Hamma Incident: Israel attempts to enforce its sovereignty over the demilitarized zone along the Syrian border, which included the site of Hamat Gader, by sending a force of IDF soldiers dressed in police uniforms to the site. Syrian soldiers guarding the entrance to Hamat Gader order the Israeli force to turn back immediately, but it refuses and continues on its way. Once the Israeli force had passed, the Syrians open fire on it from the rear, killing seven Israeli soldiers and wounding three. One IDF soldier who survived the attack is taken prisoner.
- 5 April – Operation El-Hamma: Following the El-Ḥamma incident, Israeli Air Force planes launch an attack on Hamat Gader. The operation fails, as the attacking planes miss their target. Israel also bombed Arab houses in the frontier zone southeast of Lake Tiberias.
- 2–6 May – A five-day battle occurs between Syrian Army and the IDF after Syrian troops enter the demilitarized zone in Chorazin, northeast of the Sea of Galilee.
- 7 May – The first of ultimately six million trees are planted in the Forest of the Martyrs on the outskirts of Jerusalem as a living memorial to the six million Jews who were murdered by the Nazis and their collaborators during World War II.
- 30 July – Mapai, headed by David Ben-Gurion, obtains the largest number of votes in the second Israeli legislative elections.
- 8 October – David Ben-Gurion presents his cabinet for a Knesset "Vote of Confidence". The 3rd Government is approved that day and the members were sworn in.
- 20 October – The eastern suburbs of Gaza City are attacked by two companies from the IDF's 7th Armored Brigade. Dozens were killed or injured.
- 11 November – The Egged bus company becomes a cross-country public transportation network after merging with the northern "Shahar" bus company and the southern "Drom Yehuda" bus company.
- 19 November – In the 1951 Israeli presidential election, the Knesset re-elects Chaim Weizmann, who is in ill-health, as President of Israel, with 85 votes in favour and 11 votes against. There is no other candidate.
- 4 December – An Israeli woman is abducted in Jerusalem by Palestinian fedayeen, who rape and murder her.

=== Unspecified dates ===
The following events took place during 1951 (dates not specified):

- The founding of the moshav Beit HaGadi.
- The founding of the kibbutz Dvir.
- The founding of the city Eilat.
- The founding of the kibbutz Kfar Aza.
- The founding of the kibbutz Kissufim.
- The founding of the moshav Margaliot.
- The founding of the local council Mevaseret Zion.
- The founding of the moshav Sharsheret.
- The founding of the local council Yeruham.
- The founding of the kibbutz Yotvata.

== Births ==
- 6 May – Nachman Wolf, Paralympic discus, shot put and javelin throw athlete (died 2022)
- 25 September – Yardena Arazi, singer and entertainer.
- 18 November – Yoni Rechter, musician, composer, pianist, arranger and singer.

== See also ==
- 1951 in Israeli film
- 1951 in Israeli music
- 1951 in Israeli sport
