= List of Israeli films of 1951 =

A list of films produced by the Israeli film industry in 1951.

== 1951 releases ==
Premiere	Title	Director	Cast	Genre	Notes	Ref
?	Alpayim Ve'shalosh (Hebrew: אלפיים ושלוש, lit. "Two Thousand and Three")	Baruch Dienar	Ben Edden, Michael Geri, MacDonald Parke	Documentary		
?	Tent City	Leopold Lahola	Ephraim Pinchas, Uri Edelmann, Nissim Habib	Short film		

== See also ==
- 1951 in Israel
