= History of Israel =

The history of Israel spans the Southern Levant, from prehistoric African migrations and the Natufian culture (c. 10,000 BCE) to the emergence of Canaanite civilization. During the Iron Age, the kingdoms of Israel and Judah formed, serving as the foundation for Judaism, Christianity, and Islam.

The region was subsequently conquered by successive empires, including the Assyrians, Babylonians, Persians, and Greeks. Following a century of independence under the Hasmonean dynasty, the area fell to the Roman Republic. The Jewish–Roman wars led to massive Jewish casualties and displacement, after which a Christian majority emerged under Byzantine rule. The 7th-century Muslim conquest of the Levant introduced various Islamic caliphates, followed by the Crusades, Mamluk rule, and four centuries of Ottoman administration.

In the 19th century, Zionism drove increased Jewish immigration (aliyah). After World War I, Britain assumed control under the Mandate for Palestine, committing to a Jewish homeland via the Balfour Declaration. Rising tensions between Arabs and Jews led to the 1947 UN Partition Plan and a subsequent civil war. Israel's 1948 independence sparked the 1948 Arab–Israeli War, repelling neighboring armies but resulting in significant regional displacement. Despite peace treaties with Egypt (1979) and Jordan (1994), and the Oslo I Accord (1993) establishing the Palestinian Authority, the Israeli–Palestinian conflict remains unresolved.

== Prehistory ==
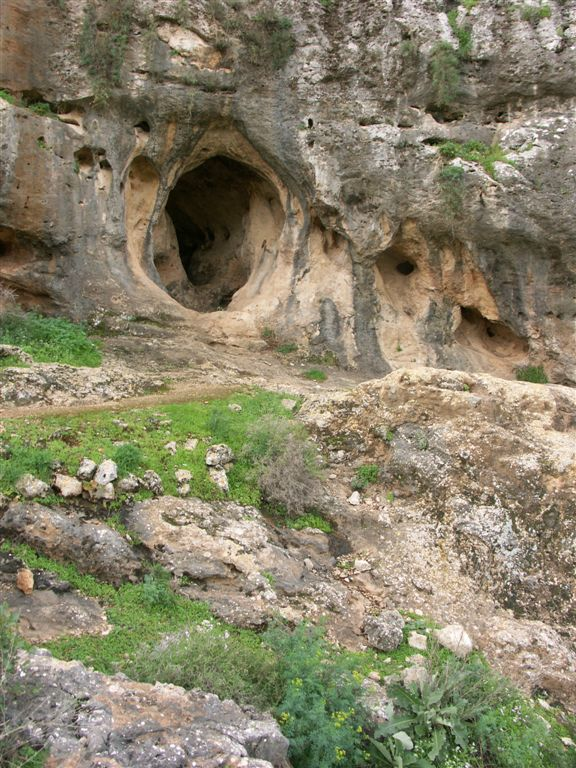
Skhul Cave

The oldest evidence of early humans in the territory of modern Israel, dating to 1.5 million years ago, was found in Ubeidiya near the Sea of Galilee. Flint artifacts found beneath a basalt layer at Yir'on were dated to more than 2.4 million years ago. In 2006 archaeologist Avraham Ronen described Yir'on as the oldest known hominine site outside Africa. The Daughters of Jacob Bridge over the Jordan River provides evidence of the control of fire by early humans around 780,000 years ago, one of the oldest known examples.

Neanderthal and early modern human remains from the caves of Tabun and Skhul in the Nahal Me'arot Nature Reserve provide the region's longest stratigraphic record, spanning roughly 600,000 years of human evolution since the Lower Paleolithic. Other significant Paleolithic sites include Qesem cave. A 200,000-year-old fossil from Misliya Cave is the second-oldest evidence of anatomically modern humans found outside Africa. Other notable finds include the Skhul and Qafzeh hominins, as well as Manot 1. Around 10th millennium BCE, the Natufian culture existed in the area. The beginning of agriculture in the region and the Neolithic Revolution are evidenced by sites such as ʿAin Mallaha and Atlit Yam.

=== Periodisation ===
Here is one of the more common periodisations.

- Stone Age (pre-4500 BCE): hunter-gatherer societies, slowly evolving into farming and herding societies
  - Palaeolithic
    - Epipalaeolithic
      - Early
      - Middle
      - Late. See Natufian culture (15,000-11,500 BP)
  - Neolithic
    - Pre-Pottery Neolithic (PPN)
      - Pre-Pottery Neolithic A (PPNA)
      - Pre-Pottery Neolithic B (PPNB)
      - Pre-Pottery Neolithic C (PPNC)
    - Late Neolithic
      - Pottery Neolithic A (PNA)
        - Yarmukian culture
        - Lodian (Jericho IX) culture
      - Pottery Neolithic B (PNB)
        - Wadi Rabah culture
        - Timnian culture in southern Negev (and Sinai); pastoralist, persists through to the Bronze Age
- Chalcolithic (4500–3500 BCE): early metal-working and farming; see Timna Valley

== Bronze Age Canaan ==
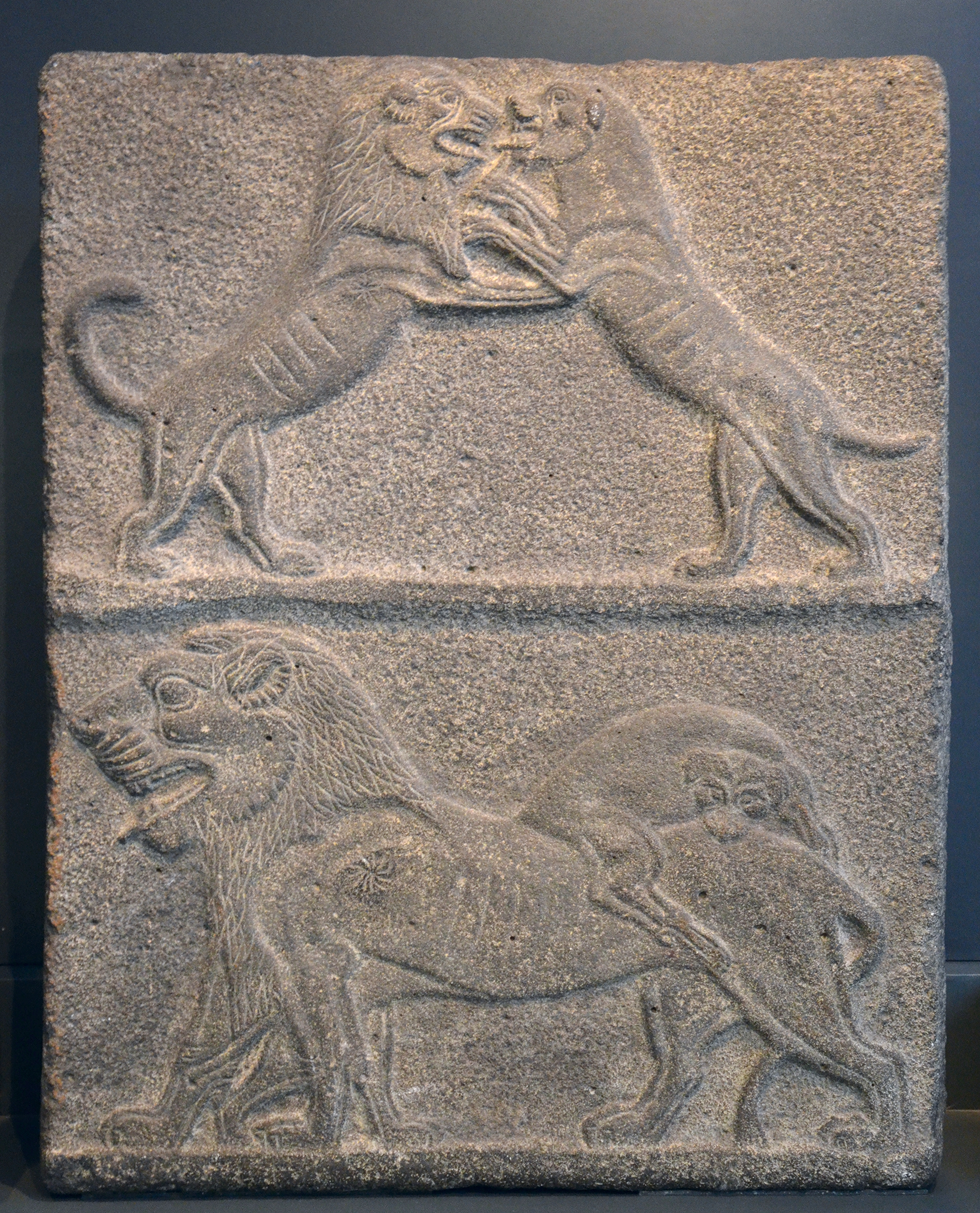
Canaanite sculpture showing a lion and a lioness at play. Beit She'an, 14th century BCE. Today in the Israel Museum

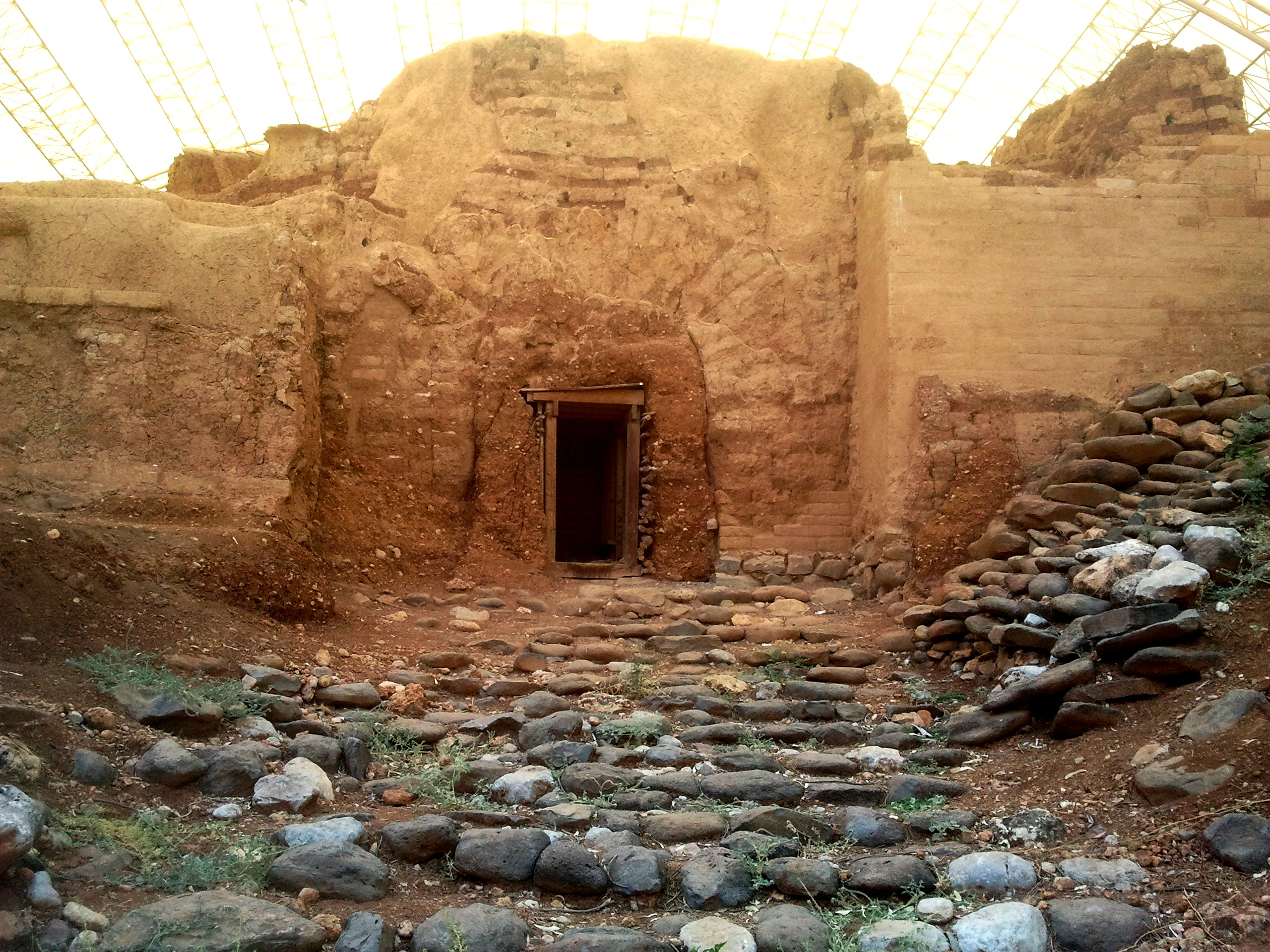
Canaanite-period gate, Tel Dan

The Canaanites are archaeologically attested in the Middle Bronze Age (2100–1550 BCE). There were probably independent or semi-independent city-states. Cities were often surrounded by massive earthworks, resulting in the archaeological mounds, or 'tells' common in the region today. In the late Middle Bronze Age, the Nile Delta in Egypt was settled by Canaanites who maintained close connections with Canaan. During that period, the Hyksos, dynasties of Canaanite/Asiatic origin, ruled much of Lower Egypt before being overthrown in the 16th century BCE.

During the Late Bronze Age (1550–1200 BCE), there were Canaanite vassal states paying tribute to the New Kingdom of Egypt, which governed from Gaza. In 1457 BCE, Egyptian forces under the command of Pharaoh Thutmose III defeated a rebellious coalition of Canaanite vassal states led by Kadesh's king at the Battle of Megiddo.

In the Late Bronze Age there was a period of civilizational collapse in the Middle East, Canaan fell into chaos, and Egyptian control ended. There is evidence that urban centers such as Hazor, Beit She'an, Megiddo, Ekron, Isdud and Ascalon were damaged or destroyed. Two groups appear at this time, and are associated with the transition to the Iron Age (they used iron weapons/tools which were better than earlier bronze): the Sea Peoples, particularly the Philistines, who migrated from the Aegean world and settled on the southern coast, and the Israelites, whose settlements dotted the highlands.

Some 2nd millennium inscriptions about the semi-nomadic Habiru people are believed to be connected to the Hebrews, who were generally synonymous with the Biblical Israelites. Many scholars regard this connection to be plausible since the two ethnonyms have similar etymologies, although others argue that Habiru refers to a social class found in every Near Eastern society, including Hebrew societies.

== Ancient Israel and Judah: Iron Age to Babylonian period ==
=== Early Israelites (Iron Age I) ===
The earliest recorded evidence of a people by the name of Israel (as ysrỉꜣr) occurs in the Egyptian Merneptah Stele, erected for Pharaoh Merneptah c. 1209 BCE.

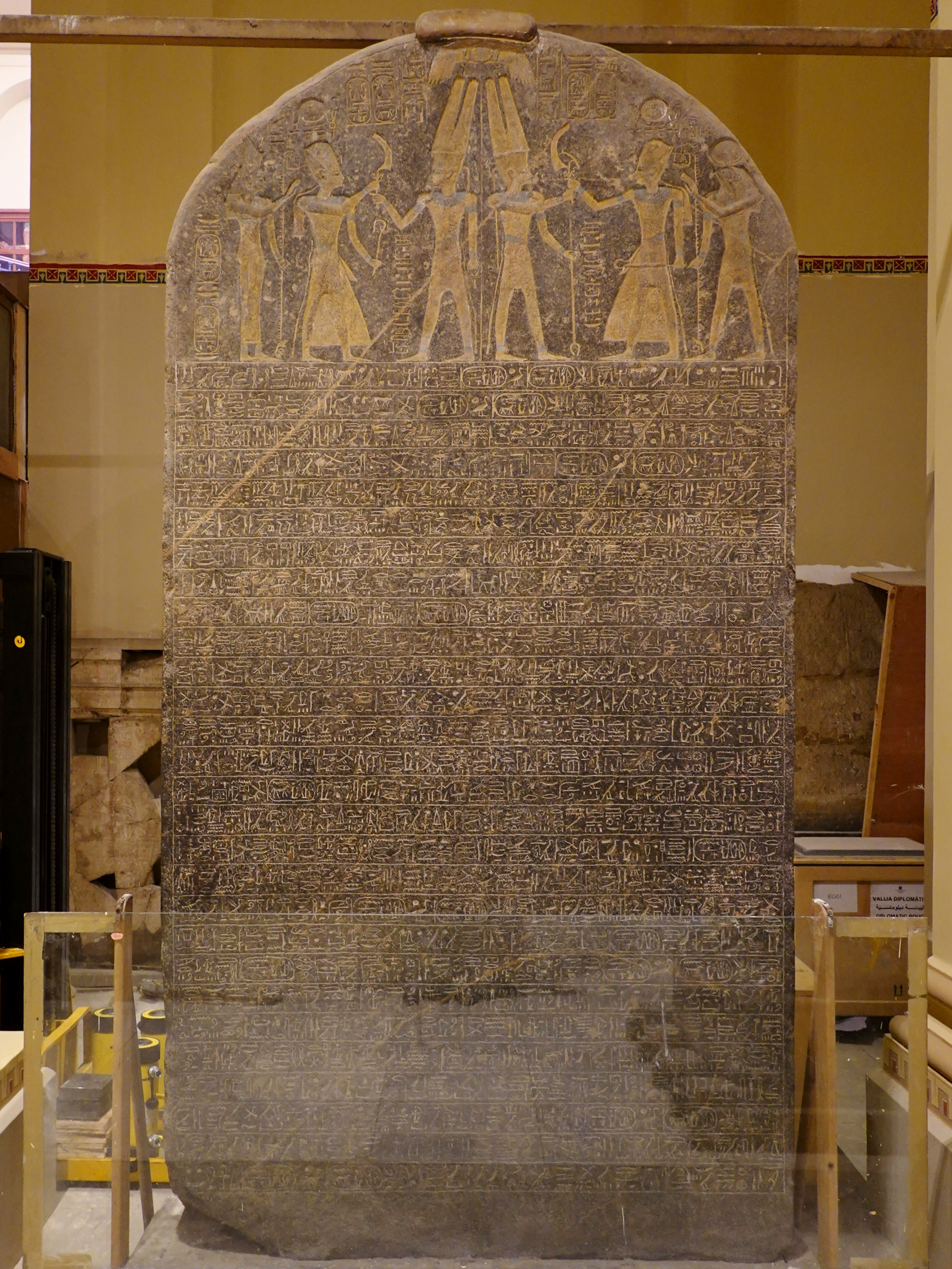
The Merneptah Stele, dated c. 1209 BCE, is the earliest textual reference to Israel

Archeological evidence indicates that during the early Iron Age I, hundreds of small villages were established on the highlands of Canaan on both sides of the Jordan River, primarily in Samaria, north of Jerusalem. These villages had populations of up to 400, were largely self-sufficient and lived from herding, grain cultivation, and growing vines and olives with some economic interchange. The pottery was plain and undecorated. Writing was known and available for recording, even in small sites. William G. Dever sees this "Israel" in the central highlands as a cultural and probably political entity, more an ethnic group rather than an organized state.

Modern scholars believe that the Israelites and their culture branched out of the Canaanite peoples and their cultures through the development of a distinct monolatristic—and later monotheistic—religion centred on a national god Yahweh. According to McNutt, "It is probably safe to assume that sometime during Iron Age I a population began to identify itself as 'Israelite'", differentiating itself from the Canaanites through such markers as the prohibition of intermarriage, an emphasis on family history and genealogy, and religion.

Philistine cooking tools and the prevalence of pork in their diets, and locally made Mycenaean pottery—which later evolved into bichrome Philistine pottery—all support their foreign origin. Their cities were large and elaborate, which—together with the findings—point to a complex, hierarchical society.

Israel Finkelstein believes that the oldest Abraham traditions originated in the Iron Age, which focus on the themes of land and offspring and possibly, his altars in Hebron. Abraham's Mesopotamian heritage is not discussed.

=== Israel and Judah (Iron Age II) ===
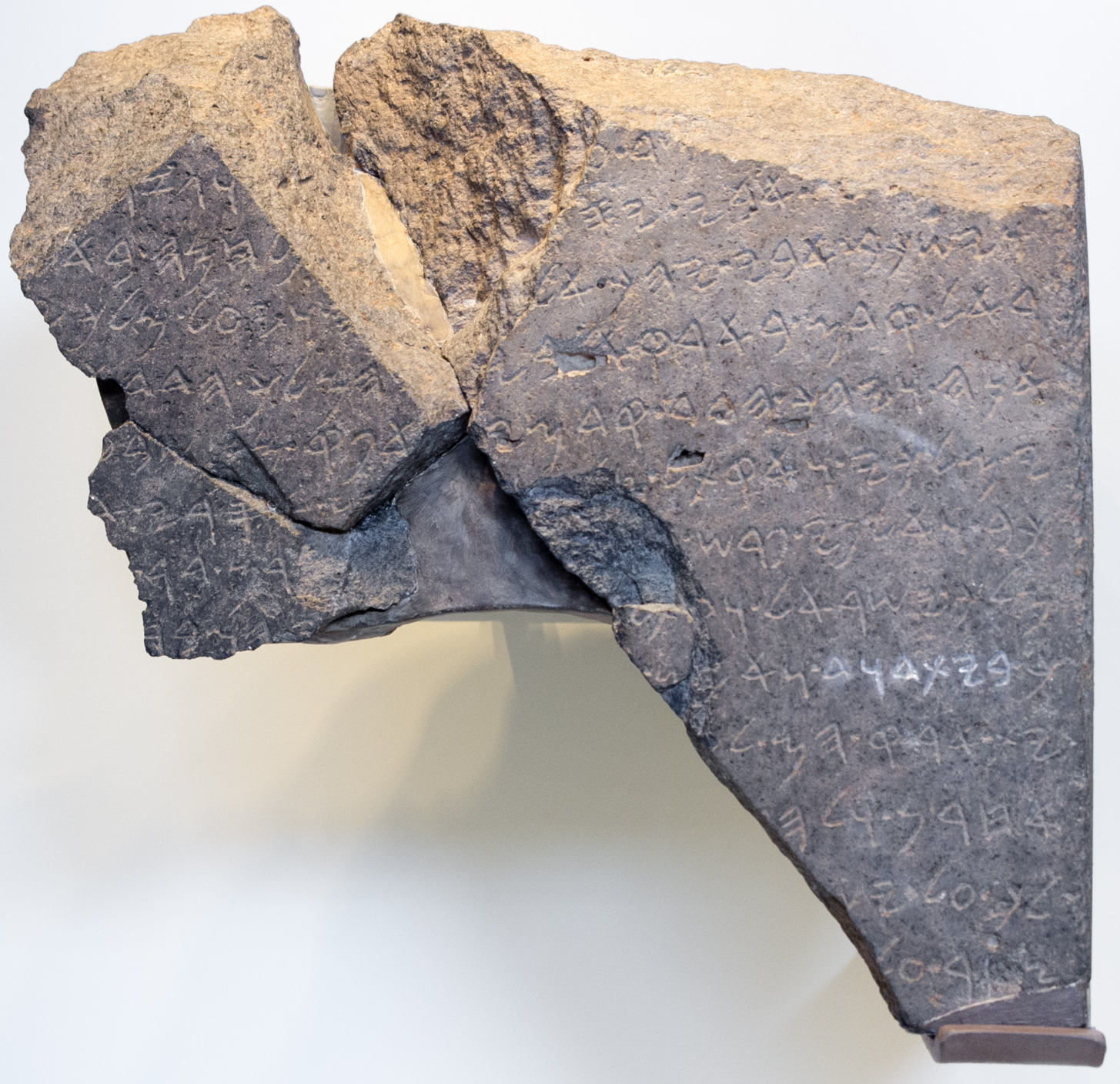
The Tel Dan stele contains the earliest reference to the House of David

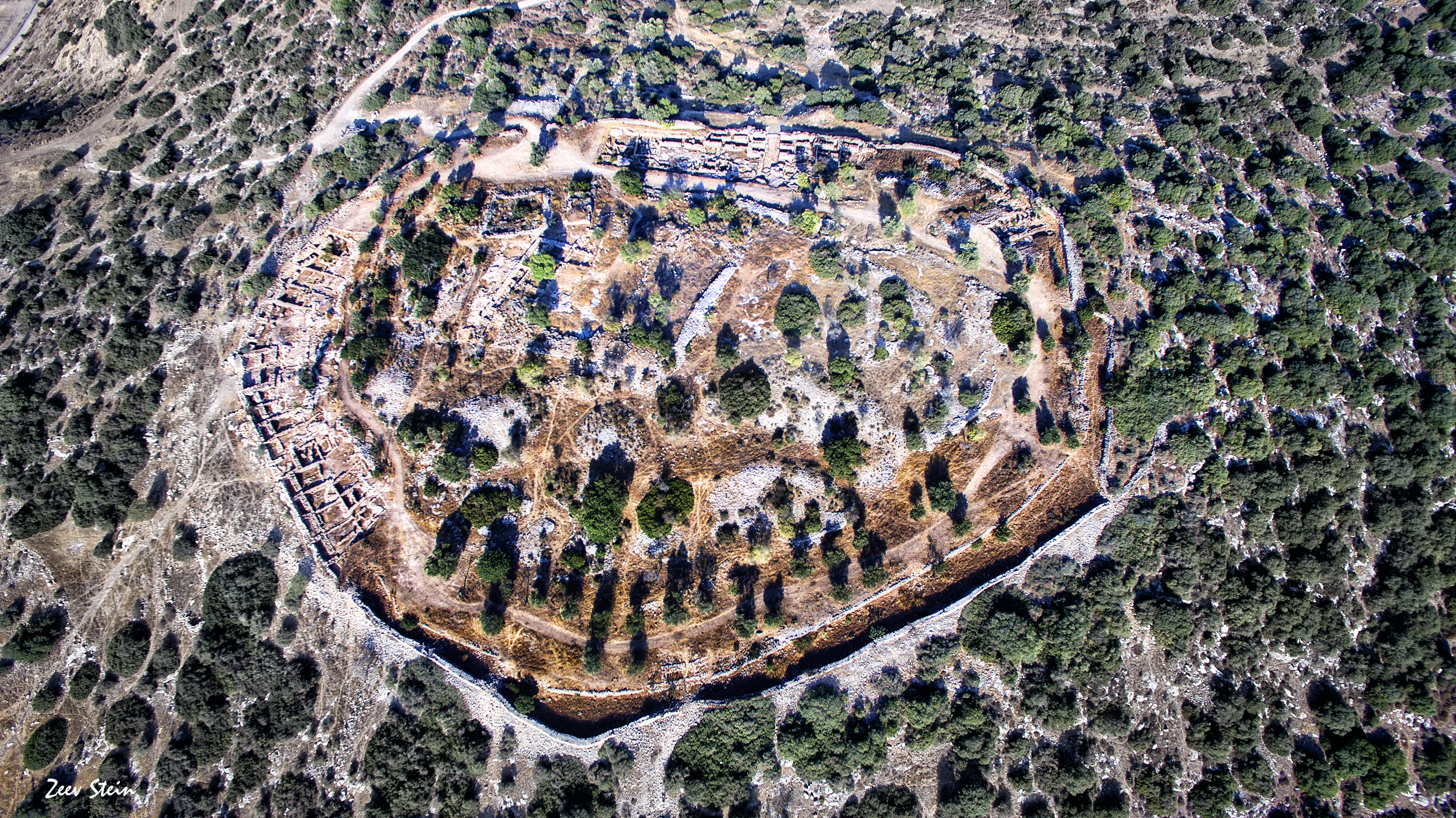
Khirbet Qeiyafa, an early 10th century fortified city overlooking the Elah Valley, associated by scholars with the kingdom of David

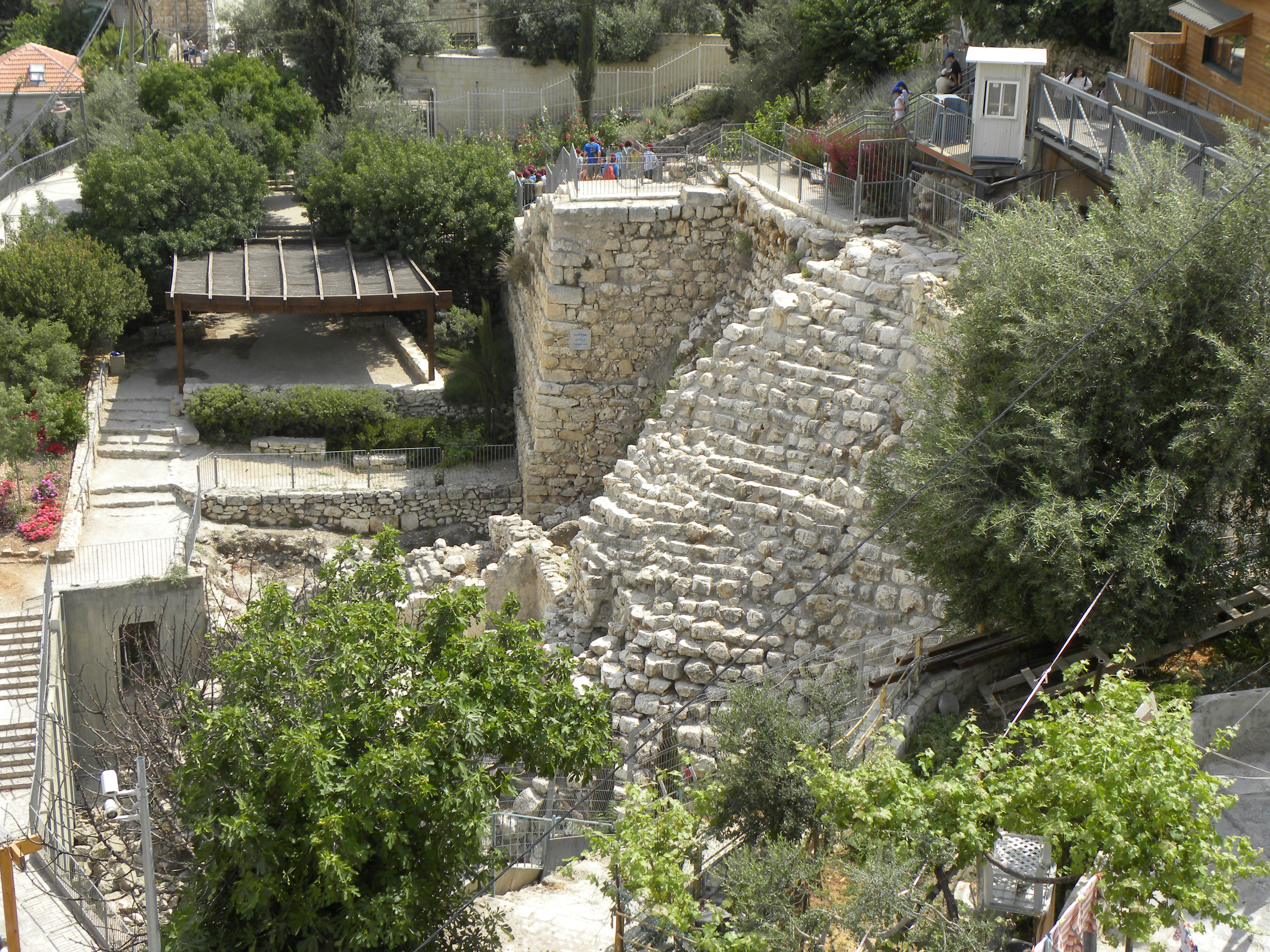
The Stepped Stone Structure, City of David, Jerusalem

In the 10th century BCE, the Israelite kingdoms of Judah and Israel emerged. The Hebrew Bible states that these were preceded by a single kingdom ruled by Saul, David and Solomon, who is said to have built the First Temple. Archaeologists have debated whether the united monarchy ever existed, (Note: The debate is described in Amihai Mazar, "Archaeology and the Biblical Narrative: The Case of the United Monarchy" (see bibliography), p.29 fn.2: "For conservative approaches defining the United Monarchy as a state "from Dan to Beer Sheba" including "conquered kingdoms" (Ammon, Moab, Edom) and "spheres of influence" in Geshur and Hamath cf. e.g. Ahlström (1993), 455–542; Meyers (1998); Lemaire (1999); Masters (2001); Stager (2003); Rainey (2006), 159–168; Kitchen (1997); Millard (1997; 2008). For a total denial of the historicity of the United Monarchy cf. e.g. Davies (1992), 67–68; others suggested a 'chiefdom' comprising a small region around Jerusalem, cf. Knauf (1997), 81–85; Niemann (1997), 252–299 and Finkelstein (1999). For a 'middle of the road' approach suggesting a United Monarchy of larger territorial scope though smaller than the biblical description cf.e.g. Miller (1997); Halpern (2001), 229–262; Liverani (2005), 92–101. The latter recently suggested a state comprising the territories of Judah and Ephraim during the time of David, that was subsequently enlarged to include areas of northern Samaria and influence areas in the Galilee and Transjordan. Na'aman (1992; 1996) once accepted the basic biography of David as authentic and later rejected the United Monarchy as a state, cf. id. (2007), 401–402".) with those in favor of such a polity existing further divided between maximalists who support the Biblical accounts, and minimalists who argue that any such polity was likely smaller than suggested.

Historians and archaeologists agree that the northern Kingdom of Israel existed by ca. 900 BCE and the Kingdom of Judah existed by ca. 850 BCE. The Kingdom of Israel was the more prosperous of the two kingdoms and soon developed into a regional power; during the days of the Omride dynasty, it controlled Samaria, Galilee, the upper Jordan Valley, the Sharon and large parts of the Transjordan. Samaria, the capital, was home to one of the largest Iron Age structures in the Levant. The Kingdom of Israel's capital moved between Shechem, Penuel and Tirzah before Omri settled it in Samaria, and the royal succession was often settled by a military coup d'état. The Kingdom of Judah was smaller but more stable; the Davidic dynasty ruled the kingdom for the four centuries of its existence, with the capital always in Jerusalem, controlling the Judaean Mountains, most of the Shephelah and the Beersheba valley in the northern Negev.

In 854 BCE, according to the Kurkh Monoliths, an alliance between Ahab of Israel and Ben Hadad II of Aram-Damascus managed to repulse the incursions of the Assyrians, with a victory at the Battle of Qarqar. Another important discovery of the period is the Mesha Stele, a Moabite stele found in Dhiban when Emir Sattam Al-Fayez led Henry Tristram to it as they toured the lands of the vassals of the Bani Sakher. The stele is now in the Louvre. In the stele, Mesha, king of Moab, tells how Chemosh, the god of Moab, had been angry with his people and had allowed them to be subjugated to the Kingdom of Israel, but at length, Chemosh returned and assisted Mesha to throw off the yoke of Israel and restore the lands of Moab. It refers to Omri, king of Israel, to the god Yahweh, and may contain another early reference to the House of David.

==== Assyrian invasions ====
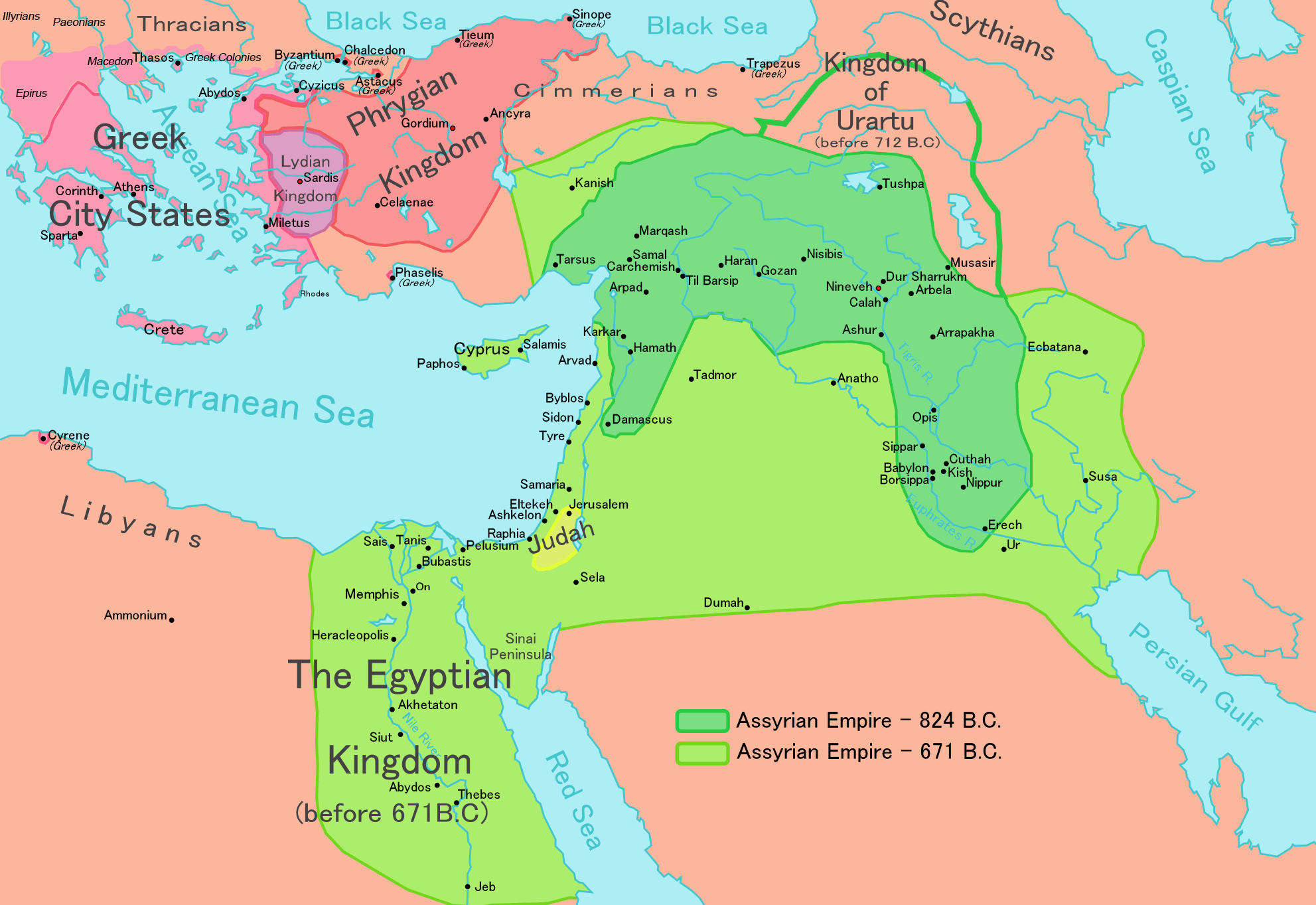
Neo-Assyrian Empire at its greatest territorial extent

The Kingdom of Israel fell to the Assyrians following a long siege of the capital Samaria around 720 BCE. The records of Sargon II indicate that he captured Samaria and deported 27,290 inhabitants to Mesopotamia. It is likely that Shalmaneser captured the city since both the Babylonian Chronicles and the Hebrew Bible viewed the fall of Israel as the signature event of his reign. The Assyrian deportations became the basis for the Jewish idea of the Ten Lost Tribes. Foreign groups were settled by the Assyrians in the territories of the fallen kingdom. The Samaritans claim to be descended from Israelites of ancient Samaria who were not expelled by the Assyrians.

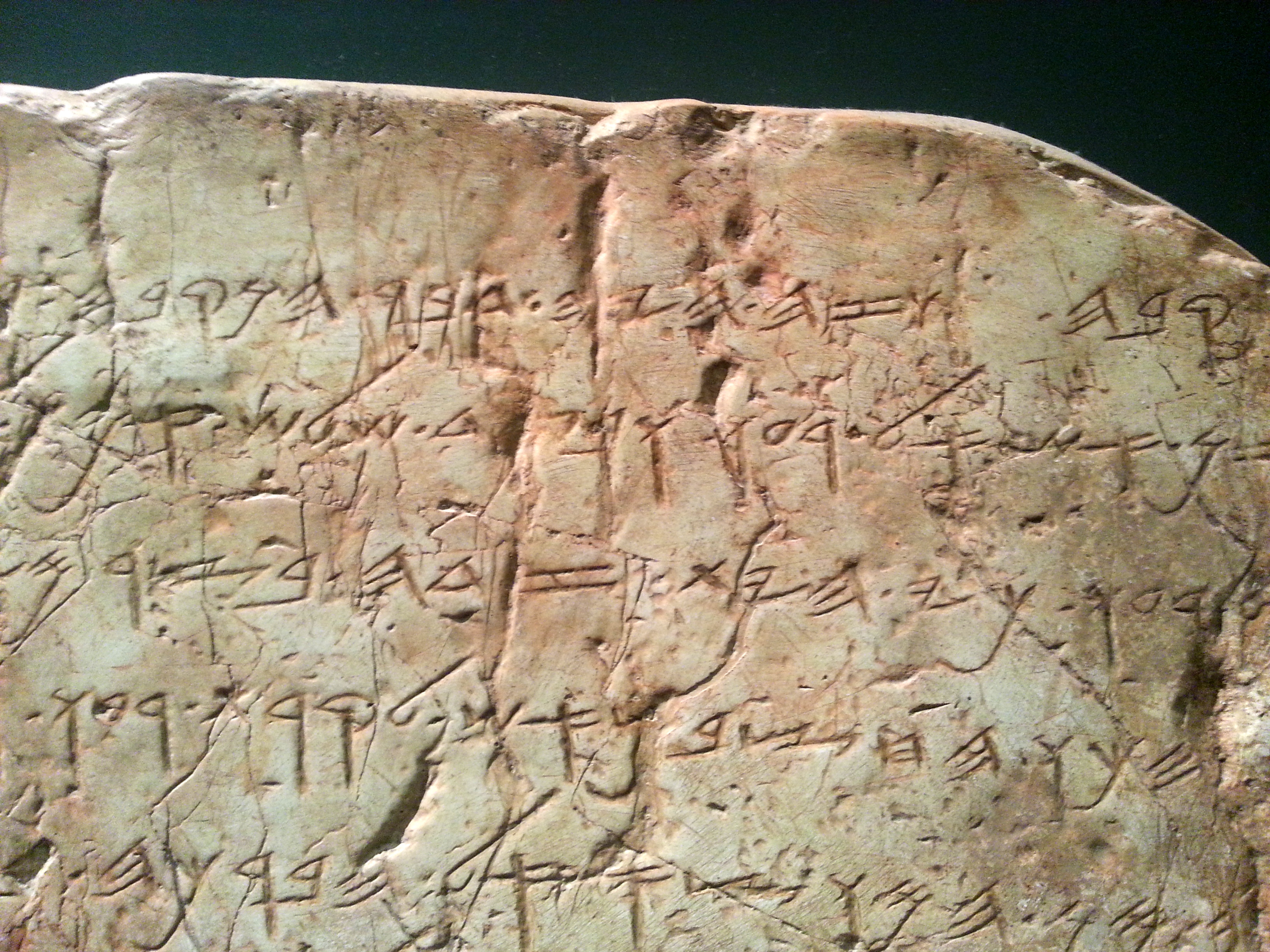
Detail of the Siloam inscription

It is believed that refugees from the destruction of Israel moved to Judah, massively expanding Jerusalem and leading to construction of the Siloam Tunnel during the rule of King Hezekiah (ruled 715–686 BCE). The Siloam inscription, a plaque written in Hebrew left by the construction team, was discovered in the tunnel in 1880s, and is today held by the Istanbul Archaeology Museum.

During Hezekiah's rule, Sennacherib, the son of Sargon, attempted but failed to capture Judah. Assyrian records say that Sennacherib levelled 46 walled cities and besieged Jerusalem, leaving after receiving extensive tribute. Sennacherib erected the Lachish reliefs in Nineveh to commemorate a second victory at Lachish.

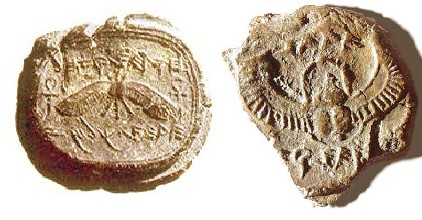
"Hezekiah ... king of Judah" – Royal seal written in the Paleo-Hebrew alphabet, unearthed in Jerusalem

The writings of four different "prophets" are believed to date from this period: Hosea and Amos in Israel and Micah and Isaiah of Judah. These men were mostly social critics who warned of the Assyrian threat and acted as religious spokesmen. They exercised some form of free speech and may have played a significant social and political role in Israel and Judah. They urged rulers and the general populace to adhere to god-conscious ethical ideals, seeing the Assyrian invasions as a divine punishment of the collective resulting from ethical failures.

Under King Josiah (ruler from 641 to 619 BCE), the Book of Deuteronomy was either rediscovered or written. The Book of Joshua and the accounts of the kingship of David and Solomon in the Book of Kings are believed to have the same author. The books are known as Deuteronomist and considered to be a key step in the emergence of monotheism in Judah. They emerged at a time that Assyria was weakened by the emergence of Babylon and may be a committing to text of pre-writing verbal traditions.

=== Babylonian period (587–538 BCE) ===
==== First revolt, 597 defeat ====
During the late 7th century BCE, Judah became a vassal state of the Neo-Babylonian Empire. In 601 BCE, Jehoiakim of Judah allied with Babylon's principal rival, Egypt, despite the strong remonstrances of the prophet Jeremiah. As a punishment, the Babylonians besieged Jerusalem in 597 BCE, and the city surrendered. The defeat was recorded by the Babylonians. Nebuchadnezzar pillaged Jerusalem and deported king Jechoiachin (Jeconiah), along with other prominent citizens, to Babylon; Zedekiah, his uncle, was installed as king.

A few years later, Zedekiah launched another revolt against Babylon, and an army was sent to conquer Jerusalem.

==== Second revolt, 587/86 defeat ====
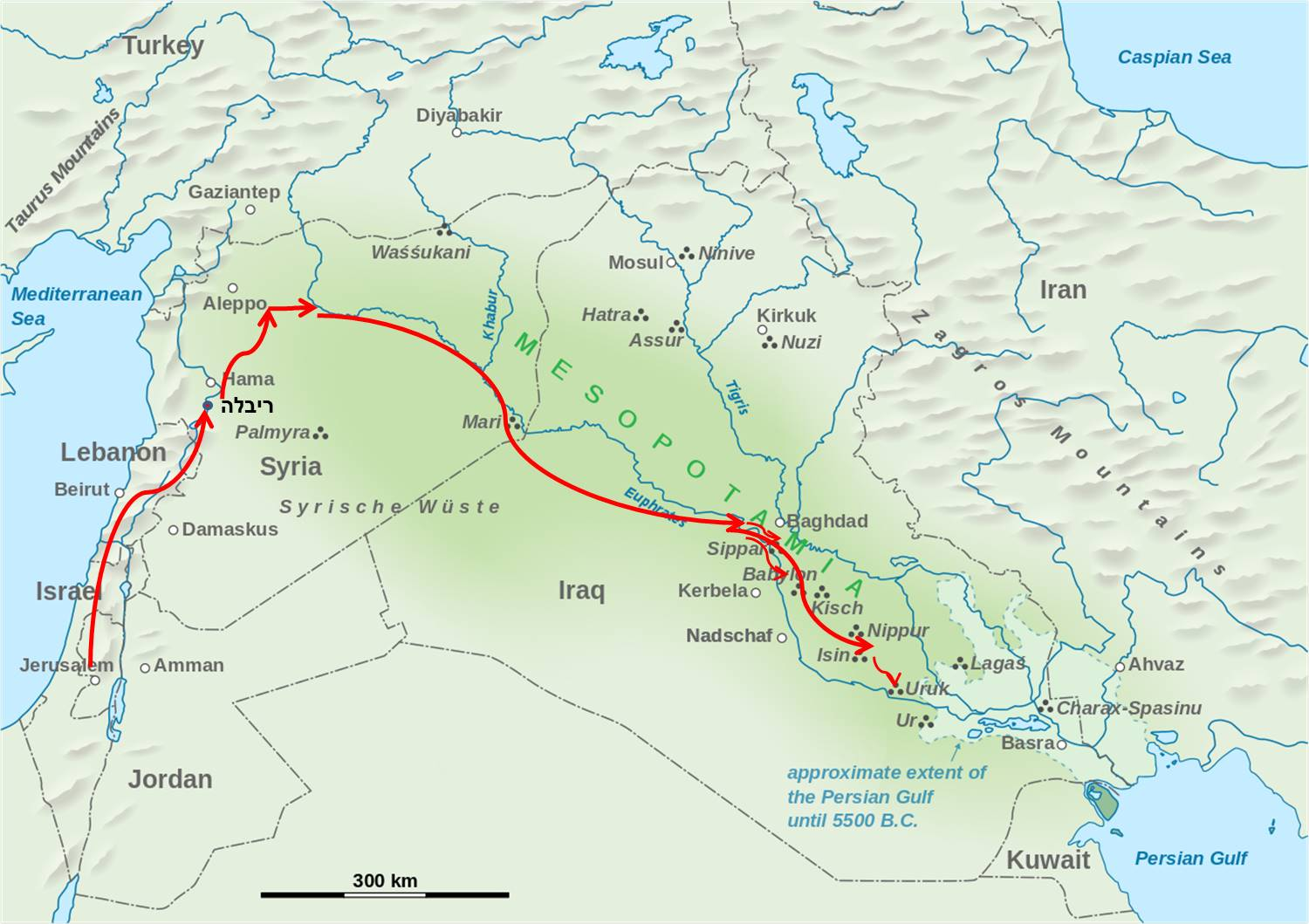
The route of the exiles to Babylon

In 587 or 586 BCE, King Nebuchadnezzar II of Babylon conquered Jerusalem, destroyed the First Temple and razed the city. The Kingdom of Judah was abolished, and many of its citizens were exiled to Babylon. The former territory of Judah became a Babylonian province called Yehud with its center in Mizpah, north of the destroyed Jerusalem.

==== Babylonian diaspora after 587/86 BCE ====
Tablets that describe King Jehoiachin's rations were found in the ruins of Babylon. He was eventually released by the Babylonians. According to both the Bible and the Talmud, the Davidic dynasty continued as head of Babylonian Jewry, called the "Rosh Galut" (exilarch or head of exile). Arab and Jewish sources show that the Rosh Galut continued to exist for another 1,500 years in what is now Iraq, ending in the eleventh century.

== Second Temple period ==
=== Achaemenid period (538–332 BCE) ===
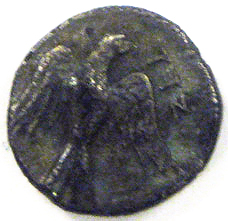
Obverse of Yehud silver coin

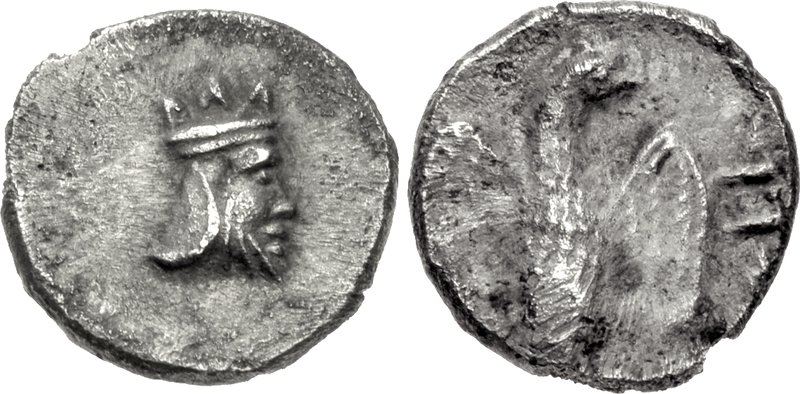
Silver coin (gerah) minted in the Persian province of Yehud, dated c. 375–332 BCE. Obv: Bearded head wearing crown, possibly representing the Persian Great King. Rev: Falcon facing, head right, with wings spread; Paleo-Hebrew YHD to right.

In 538 BCE, Cyrus the Great of the Achaemenid Empire conquered Babylon and took over its empire. Cyrus issued a proclamation granting religious freedom to all peoples subjugated by the Babylonians (see the Cyrus Cylinder). According to the Bible, Jewish exiles in Babylon, including 50,000 Judeans led by Zerubabel, returned to Judah to rebuild the Temple in Jerusalem. The Second Temple was subsequently completed c. 515 BCE. A second group of 5,000, led by Ezra and Nehemiah, returned to Judah in 456 BCE. The first was empowered by the Persian king to enforce religious rules, the second had the status of governor and a royal mission to restore the walls of the city. The country remained a province of the Achaemenid empire called Yehud until 332 BCE.

The final text of the Torah is thought to have been written during the Persian period (probably 450–350 BCE). The text was formed by editing and unifying earlier texts. The returning Israelites adopted an Aramaic script (also known as the Ashuri alphabet), which they brought back from Babylon; this is the current Hebrew script. The Hebrew calendar closely resembles the Babylonian calendar and probably dates from this period.

The Bible describes tension between the returnees, the elite of the First Temple period, and those who had remained in Judah. It is possible that the returnees, supported by the Persian monarchy, became large landholders at the expense of the people who had remained to work the land in Judah, whose opposition to the Second Temple would have reflected a fear that exclusion from the cult would deprive them of land rights. Judah had become in practice a theocracy, ruled by hereditary High Priests and a Persian-appointed governor, frequently Jewish, charged with keeping order and seeing that tribute was paid.

A Judean military garrison was placed by the Persians on Elephantine Island near Aswan in Egypt. In the early 20th century, 175 papyrus documents recording activity in this community were discovered, including the "Passover Papyrus", a letter instructing the garrison on how to correctly conduct the Passover feast.

=== Hellenistic period (333–64 BCE) ===
In 332 BCE, Alexander the Great of Macedon conquered the region as part of his campaign against the Achaemenid Empire. After his death in 322 BCE, his generals divided the empire and Judea became a frontier region between the Seleucid Empire and Ptolemaic Kingdom in Egypt. Following a century of Ptolemaic rule, Judea was conquered by the Seleucid Empire in 200 BCE at the battle of Panium. Hellenistic rulers generally respected Jewish culture and protected Jewish institutions. Judea was ruled by the hereditary office of the High Priest of Israel as a Hellenistic vassal. Nevertheless, the region underwent a process of Hellenization, which heightened tensions between Greeks, Hellenized Jews, and observant Jews. These tensions escalated into clashes involving a power struggle for the position of high priest and the character of the holy city of Jerusalem.

When Antiochus IV Epiphanes consecrated the temple, forbade Jewish practices, and forcibly imposed Hellenistic norms on the Jews, several centuries of religious tolerance under Hellenistic control came to an end. In 167 BCE, the Maccabean revolt erupted after Mattathias, a Jewish priest of the Hasmonean lineage, killed a Hellenized Jew and a Seleucid official who participated in sacrifice to the Greek gods in Modi'in. His son Judas Maccabeus defeated the Seleucids in several battles, and in 164 BCE, he captured Jerusalem and restored temple worship, an event commemorated by the Jewish festival of Hannukah.

After Judas' death, his brothers Jonathan Apphus and Simon Thassi were able to establish and consolidate a vassal Hasmonean state in Judea, capitalizing on the Seleucid Empire's decline as a result of internal instability and wars with the Parthians, and by forging ties with the rising Roman Republic. Hasmonean leader John Hyrcanus was able to gain independence, doubling Judea's territories. He took control of Idumaea, where he converted the Edomites to Judaism, and invaded Scythopolis and Samaria, where he demolished the Samaritan Temple. Hyrcanus was also the first Hasmonean leader to mint coins. Under his sons, kings Aristobulus I and Alexander Jannaeus, Hasmonean Judea became a kingdom, and its territories continued to expand, now also covering the coastal plain, Galilee and parts of the Transjordan. Some scholars argue that the Hasmonean dynasty also institutionalized the final Jewish biblical canon.

Under Hasmonean rule, the Pharisees, Sadducees and the mystic Essenes emerged as the principal Jewish social movements. The Pharisee sage Simeon ben Shetach is credited with establishing the first schools based around meeting houses. This was a key step in the emergence of Rabbinical Judaism. After Jannaeus' widow, queen Salome Alexandra, died in 67 BCE, her sons Hyrcanus II and Aristobulus II engaged in a civil war over succession. The conflicting parties requested Pompey's assistance on their behalf, which paved the way for a Roman takeover of the kingdom.

=== Early Roman period (64 BCE–2nd century CE) ===
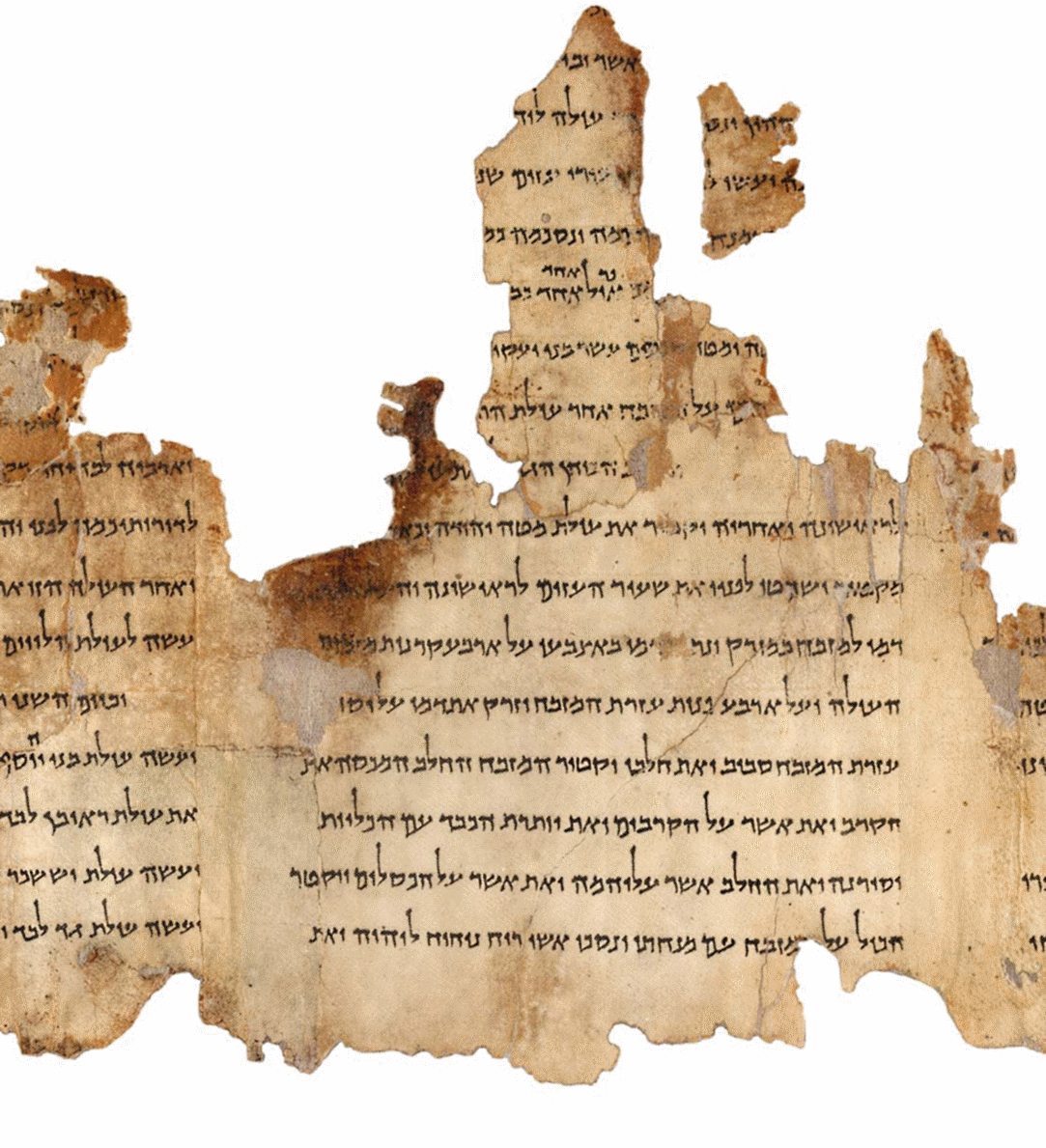
Portion of the Temple Scroll, one of the Dead Sea Scrolls written by the Essenes

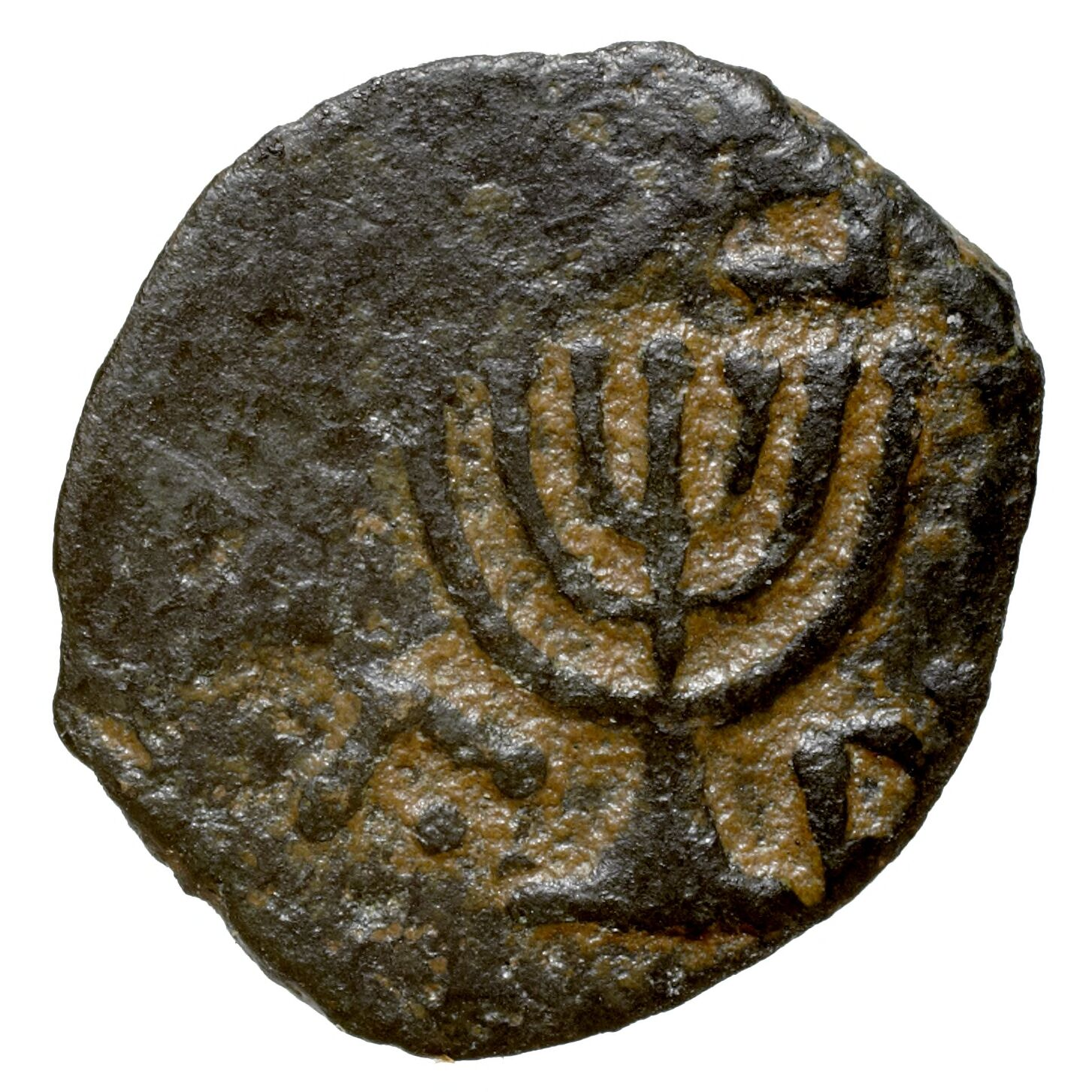
Hasmonean coin of Antigonus II Mattathias, depicting the Temple menorah

In 63 BCE, the Roman Republic conquered Judaea, ending Jewish independence under the Hasmoneans. Roman general Pompey intervened in a dynastic civil war and, after capturing Jerusalem, reinstated Hyrcanus II as high priest but denied him the title of king. Rome soon installed the Herodian dynasty—of Idumean descent but Jewish by conversion—as a loyal replacement for the nationalist Hasmoneans. In 37 BCE, Herod the Great, the first client king of this line, took power after defeating the restored Hasmonean king Antigonus II Mattathias. Herod imposed heavy taxes, suppressed opposition, and centralized authority, which fostered widespread resentment. Herod also carried out major monumental construction projects throughout his kingdom, and significantly expanded the Second Temple, which he transformed into one of the largest religious structures in the ancient world. After his death in 4 BCE, his kingdom was divided among his sons into a tetrarchy under continued Roman oversight.

In 6 CE, Roman emperor Augustus transformed Judaea into a Roman province, deposing its last Jewish ruler, Herod Archelaus, and appointing a Roman governor in his place. That same year, a census triggered a small uprising by Judas of Galilee, the founder of a movement that rejected foreign authority and recognized only God as king. Over the next six decades, with the brief exception of a short period of Jewish autonomy under the client king Herod Agrippa I, the province remained under direct Roman administration. Some governors ruled with brutality and showed little regard for Jewish religious sensitivities, deepening resentment among the local population. This discontent was also fueled by poor governance, corruption, and growing economic inequality, along with rising tensions between Jews and neighboring populations over ethnic, religious, and territorial disputes. At the same time, collective memory of the Maccabean revolt and the period of Hasmonean independence continued to inspire hopes for national liberation from Roman control.

In 64 CE, the Temple High Priest Joshua ben Gamla introduced a religious requirement for Jewish boys to learn to read from the age of six. Over the next few hundred years this requirement became steadily more ingrained in Jewish tradition.

=== Jewish–Roman wars ===
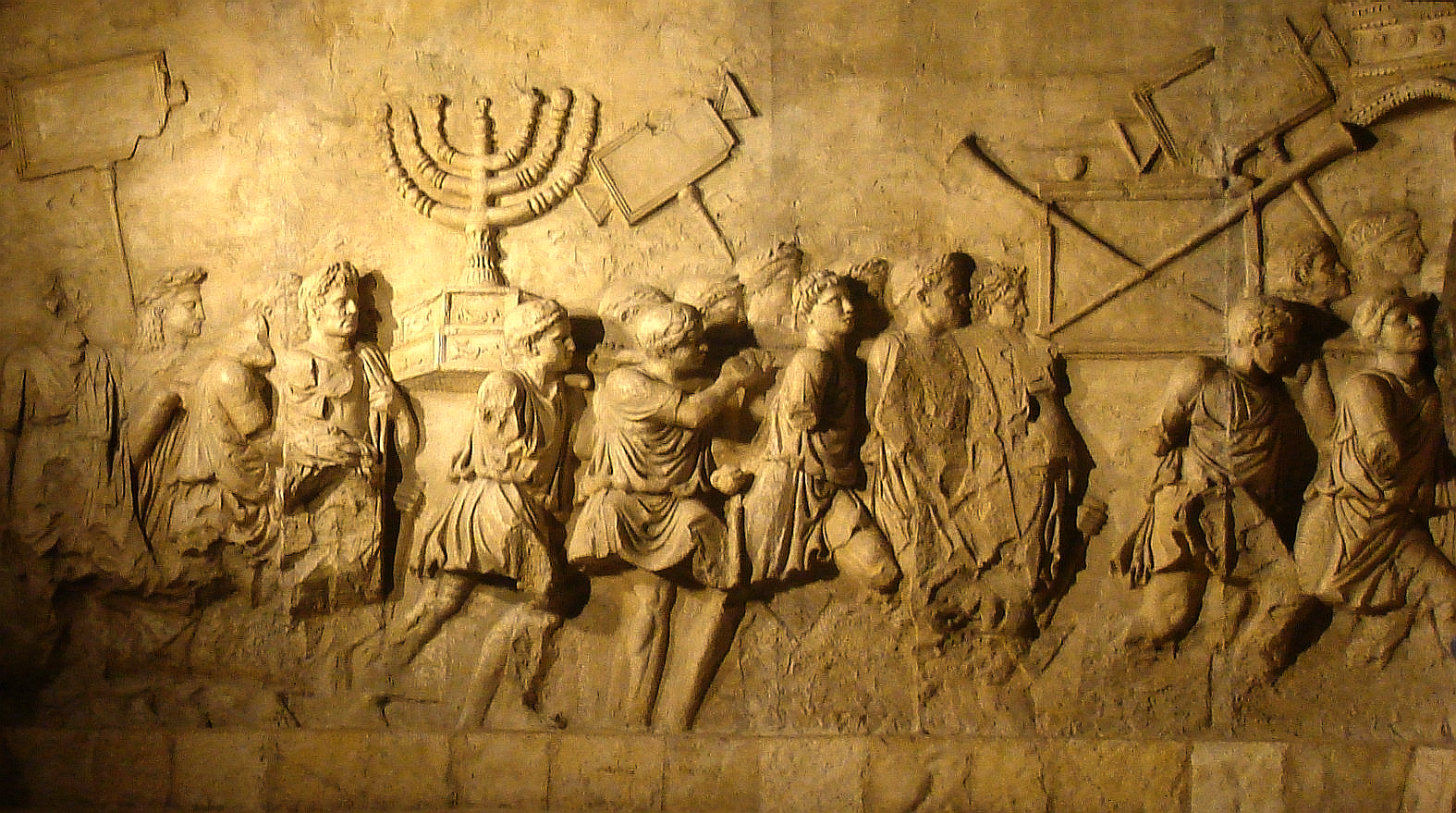
The Arch of Titus in Rome depicts the Roman triumph celebrating the fall of Jerusalem in 70 CE

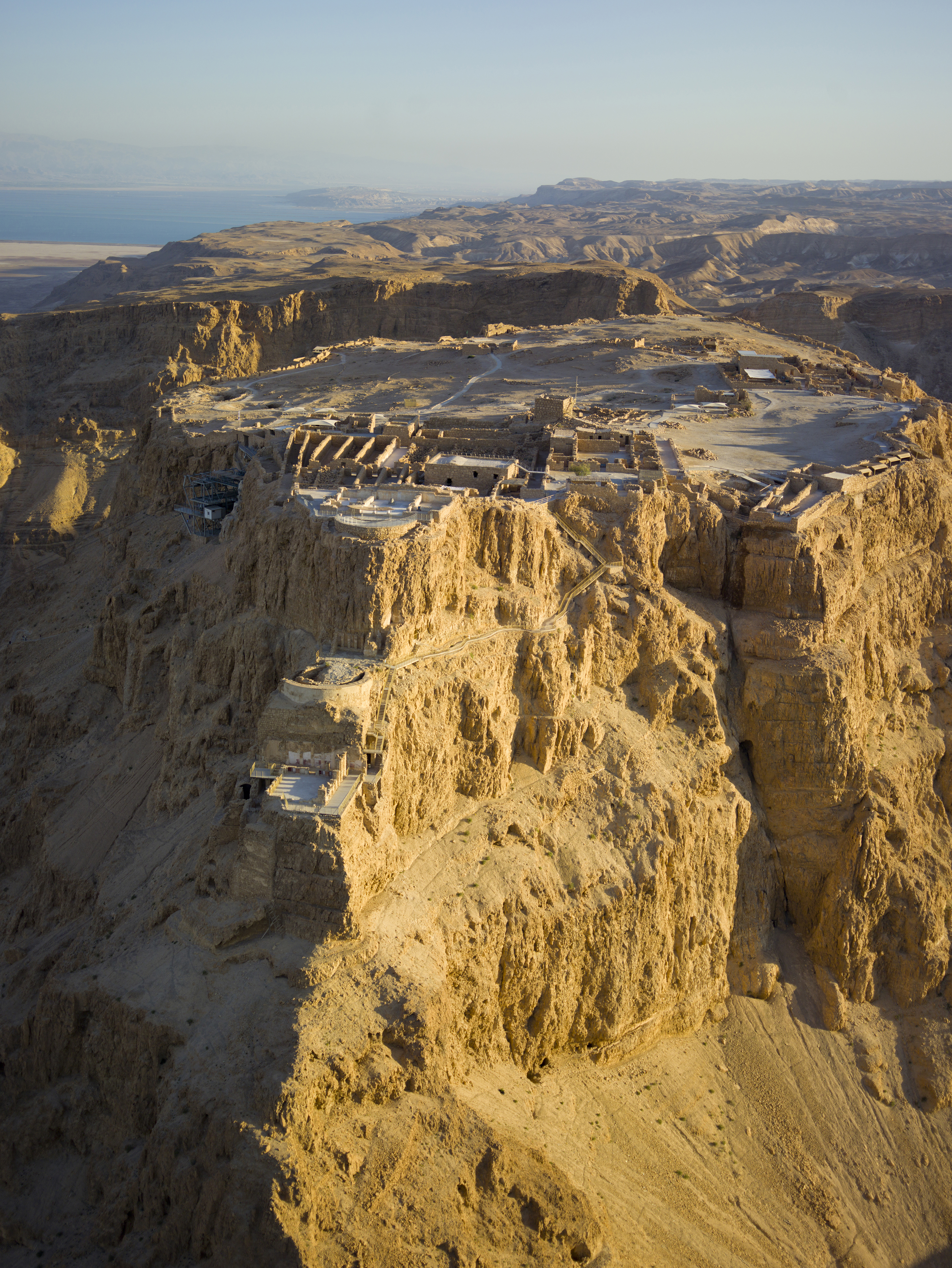
Masada fortress overlooking the Dead Sea, the location of a 1st-century Roman siege

The Jewish–Roman wars were a series of large-scale revolts by Jewish subjects against the Roman Empire between 66 and 135 CE. The term primarily applies to the First Jewish–Roman War (66–73 CE) and the Bar Kokhba revolt (132–136 CE), both nationalist rebellions aimed at restoring Jewish independence in Judea. Some sources also include the Diaspora Revolt (115–117 CE), an ethno-religious conflict fought across the Eastern Mediterranean and including the Kitos War in Judaea.

The Jewish–Roman wars had a devastating impact on the Jewish people, transforming them from a major population in the Eastern Mediterranean into a dispersed and persecuted minority. The First Jewish-Roman War culminated in the destruction of Jerusalem and other towns and villages in Judaea, resulting in significant loss of life and a considerable segment of the population being uprooted or displaced. Those who remained were stripped of any form of political autonomy. Subsequently, the brutal suppression of the Bar Kokhba revolt resulted in even more severe consequences. Judea witnessed a significant depopulation, as many Jews were killed, expelled, or sold into slavery. The outcome of the conflict marked the termination of efforts to reestablish a Jewish state until the modern era. Jews were banned from residing in the vicinity of Jerusalem, which the Romans rebuilt into the pagan colony of Aelia Capitolina, and the province of Judaea was renamed Syria Palaestina. Collectively, these events enhanced the role of Jewish diaspora, relocating the Jewish demographic and cultural center to Galilee and eventually to Babylonia, with smaller communities across the Mediterranean, the Middle East, and beyond.

The Jewish–Roman wars also had a major impact on Judaism, after the central worship site of Second Temple Judaism, the Second Temple in Jerusalem, was destroyed by Titus's troops in 70 CE. The destruction of the Temple led to a transformation in Jewish religious practices, emphasizing prayer, Torah study, and communal gatherings in synagogues. This pivotal shift laid the foundation for the emergence of Rabbinic Judaism, which has been the dominant form of Judaism since late antiquity, after the codification of the Babylonian Talmud.

== Late Roman and Byzantine periods ==
=== Late Roman period (136–390) ===
As a result of the disastrous effects of the Bar Kokhba revolt, Jewish presence in the region significantly dwindled. Over the next centuries, more Jews left to communities in the Diaspora, especially the large, speedily growing Jewish communities in Babylonia and Arabia. Others remained in the Land of Israel, where the spiritual and demographic center shifted from the depopulated Judea to Galilee. Jewish presence also continued in the southern Hebron Hills, in Ein Gedi, and on the coastal plain. The Mishnah and the Jerusalem Talmud, huge compendiums of Rabbinical discussions, were compiled during the 2nd to 4th centuries CE in Tiberias and Jerusalem.

Following the revolt, Judea's countryside was penetrated by pagan populations, including migrants from the nearby provinces of Syria, Phoenicia, and Arabia, whereas Aelia Capitolina, its immediate vicinity, and administrative centers were now inhabited by Roman veterans and settlers from the western parts of the empire.

The Romans permitted a hereditary Rabbinical Patriarch from the House of Hillel, called the "Nasi", to represent the Jews in dealings with the Romans. One prominent figure was Judah ha-Nasi, credited with compiling the final version of the Mishnah, a vast collection of Jewish oral traditions. He also emphasized the importance of education in Judaism, leading to requirements that illiterate Jews be treated as outcasts. This might have contributed to some illiterate Jews converting to Christianity. Jewish seminaries, such as those at Shefaram and Bet Shearim, continued to produce scholars. The best of these became members of the Sanhedrin, which was located first at Sepphoris and later at Tiberias. In the Galillee, many synagogues have been found dating from this period, and the burial site of the Sanhedrin leaders was discovered in Beit She'arim. In the 3rd century, the Roman Empire faced an economic crisis and imposed heavy taxation to fund wars of imperial succession. This situation prompted additional Jewish migration from Syria Palaestina to the Sasanian Empire, known for its more tolerant environment; there, a flourishing Jewish community with important Talmudic academies thrived in Babylonia, engaging in a notable rivalry with the Talmudic academies of Palaestina.

Early in the 4th century, the Emperor Constantine made Constantinople the capital of the East Roman Empire and made Christianity an accepted religion. His mother Helena made a pilgrimage to Jerusalem (326–328) and led the construction of the Church of the Nativity (birthplace of Jesus in Bethlehem), the Church of the Holy Sepulchre (burial site of Jesus in Jerusalem) and other key churches that still exist. The name Jerusalem was restored to Aelia Capitolina and became a Christian city. Jews were still banned from living in Jerusalem, but were allowed to visit and worship at the site of the ruined temple. Over the course of the next century Christians worked to eradicate "paganism", leading to the destruction of classical Roman traditions and eradication of their temples. In 351–2, another Jewish revolt in the Galilee erupted against a corrupt Roman governor.

=== Byzantine period (390–634) ===
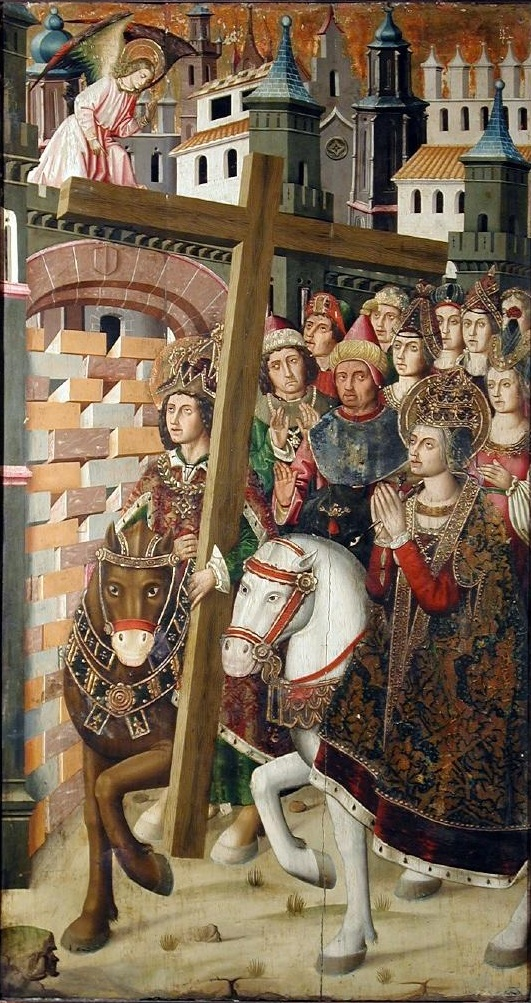
Heraclius returning the True Cross to Jerusalem, 15th-century painting by Miguel Ximénez

The Roman Empire split in 390 CE and the region became part of the Eastern Roman Empire, known as the Byzantine Empire. Under Byzantine rule, much of the region and its non-Jewish population were won over by Christianity, which eventually became the dominant religion in the region. The presence of holy sites drew Christian pilgrims, some of whom chose to settle, contributing to the rise of a Christian majority. Christian authorities encouraged this pilgrimage movement and appropriated lands, constructing magnificent churches at locations linked to biblical narratives. Additionally, monks established monasteries near pagan settlements, encouraging the conversion of local pagans.

During the Byzantine period, the Jewish presence in the region declined, and it is believed that Jews lost their majority status in Palestine in the fourth century. While Judaism remained the sole non-Christian religion tolerated, restrictions on Jews gradually increased, prohibiting the construction of new places of worship, holding public office, or owning Christian slaves. In 425, after the death of the last Nasi, Gamliel VI, the Nasi office and the Sanhedrin were officially abolished, and the standing of yeshivot weakened. The leadership void was gradually filled by the Jewish center in Babylonia, which would assume a leading role in the Jewish world for generations after the Byzantine period.

During the 5th and 6th centuries CE, the region witnessed a series of Samaritan revolts against Byzantine rule. Their suppression resulted in the decline of Samaritan presence and influence, and further consolidated Christian domination. Though it is acknowledged that some Jews and Samaritans converted to Christianity during the Byzantine period, the reliable historical records are limited, and they pertain to individual conversions rather than entire communities.

In 611, Khosrow II, ruler of Sassanid Persia, invaded the Byzantine Empire. He was helped by Jewish fighters recruited by Benjamin of Tiberias and captured Jerusalem in 614. The "True Cross" was captured by the Persians. The Jewish Himyarite Kingdom in Yemen may also have provided support. Nehemiah ben Hushiel was made governor of Jerusalem. Christian historians of the period claimed the Jews massacred Christians in the city, but there is no archeological evidence of destruction, leading modern historians to question their accounts. In 628, Kavad II (son of Kosrow) returned Palestine and the True Cross to the Byzantines and signed a peace treaty with them. Following the Byzantine re-entry, Heraclius massacred the Jewish population of Galilee and Jerusalem, while renewing the ban on Jews entering the latter.

== Early Muslim period ==
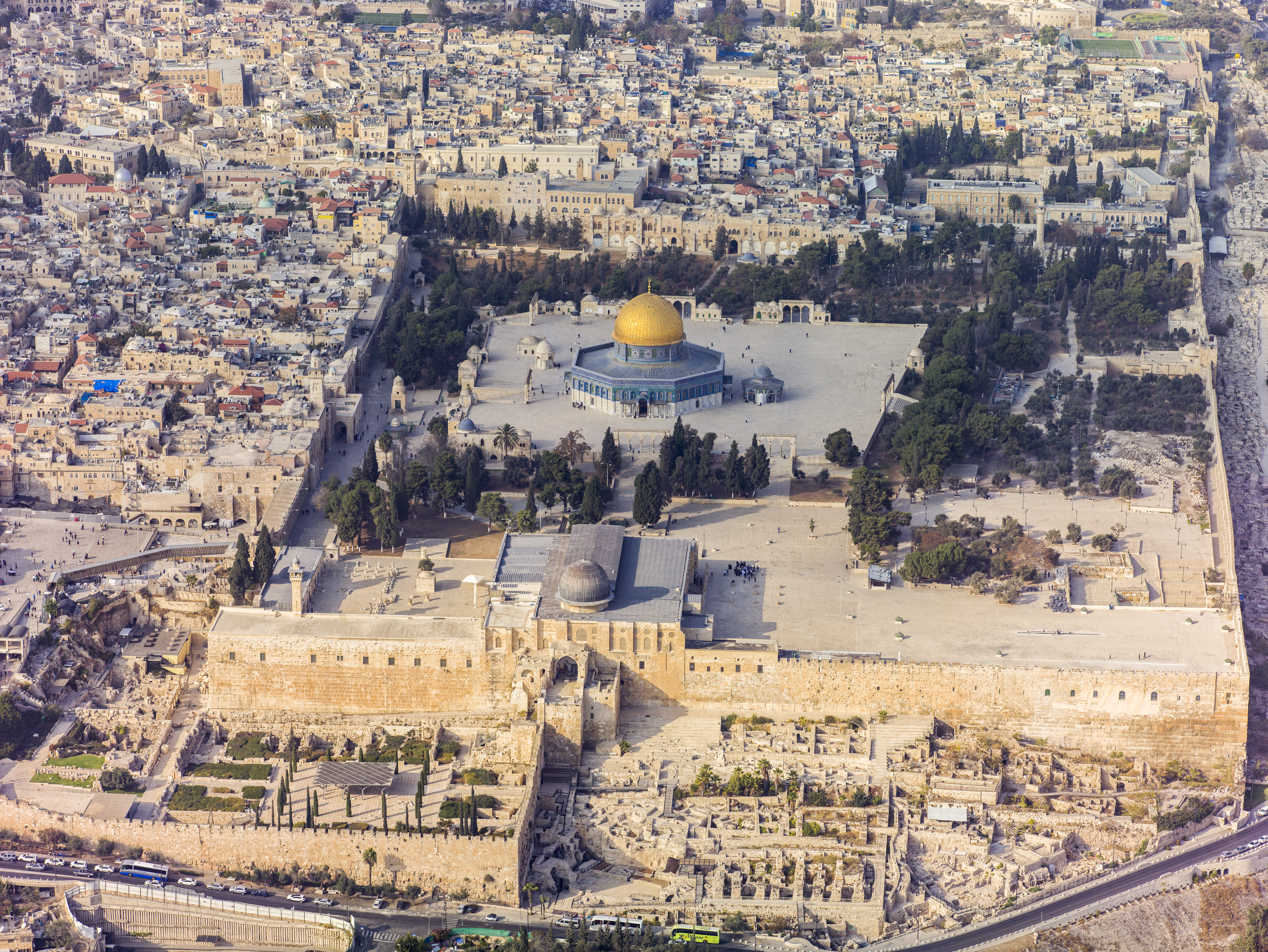
Aerial view of the Temple Mount showing the Dome of the Rock in the center and the al-Aqsa mosque to the south

The Levant was conquered by an Arab army under the command of ʿUmar ibn al-Khaṭṭāb in 635, and became the province of Bilad al-Sham of the Rashidun Caliphate. Two military districts—Jund Filastin and Jund al-Urdunn—were established in Palestine. A new city called Ramlah was built as the Muslim capital of Jund Filastin, while Tiberias served as the capital of Jund al-Urdunn. The Byzantine ban on Jews living in Jerusalem came to an end.

In 661, Mu'awiya I was crowned Caliph in Jerusalem, becoming the first of the (Damascus-based) Umayyad dynasty. In 691, Umayyad Caliph Abd al-Malik (685–705) constructed the Dome of the Rock shrine on the Temple Mount, where the two Jewish temples had been located. A second building, the Al-Aqsa Mosque, was also erected on the Temple Mount in 705. Both buildings were rebuilt in the 10th century following a series of earthquakes.

In 750, Arab discrimination against non-Arab Muslims led to the Abbasid Revolution and the Umayyads were replaced by the Abbasid Caliphs who built a new city, Baghdad, to be their capital. This period is known as the Islamic Golden Age, the Arab Empire was the largest in the world and Baghdad the largest and richest city. Both Arabs and minorities prospered across the region and much scientific progress was made. There were however setbacks: During the 8th century, the Caliph Umar II introduced a law requiring Jews and Christians to wear identifying clothing. Jews were required to wear yellow stars round their neck and on their hats, Christians had to wear Blue. Clothing regulations arose during repressive periods of Arab rule and were more designed to humiliate than persecute non-Muslims. A poll tax was imposed on all non-Muslims by Islamic rulers and failure to pay could result in imprisonment or worse.

In 982, Caliph Al-Aziz Billah of the Cairo-based Fatimid dynasty conquered the region. The Fatimids were followers of Isma'ilism, a branch of Shia Islam and claimed descent from Fatima, Mohammed's daughter. Around the year 1010, the Church of Holy Sepulchre (believed to be Jesus burial site), was destroyed by Fatimid Caliph al-Hakim, who relented ten years later and paid for it to be rebuilt. In 1020 al-Hakim claimed divine status and the newly formed Druze religion gave him the status of a messiah.

=== Demographic changes ===
Although the Arab conquest was relatively peaceful and did not cause widespread destruction, it did alter the country's demographics significantly. Over the ensuing several centuries, the region experienced a drastic decline in its population, from an estimated 1 million during Roman and Byzantine times to some 300,000 by the early Ottoman period. This demographic collapse was accompanied by a slow process of Islamization, that resulted from the flight of non-Muslim populations, immigration of Muslims, and local conversion. The majority of the remaining populace belonged to the lowest classes. While the Arab conquerors themselves left the area after the conquest and moved on to other places, the settlement of Arab tribes in the area both before and after the conquest also contributed to the Islamization. As a result, the Muslim population steadily grew and the area became gradually dominated by Muslims on a political and social level.

During the early Islamic period, many Christians and Samaritans, belonging to the Byzantine upper class, migrated from the coastal cities to northern Syria and Cyprus, which were still under Byzantine control, while others fled to the central highlands and the Transjordan. As a result, the coastal towns, formerly important economic centers connected with the rest of the Byzantine world, were emptied of most of their residents. Some of these cities—namely Ashkelon, Acre, Arsuf, and Gaza—now fortified border towns, were resettled by Muslim populations, who developed them into significant Muslim centers. The region of Samaria also underwent a process of Islamization as a result of waves of conversion among the Samaritan population and the influx of Muslims into the area. The predominantly Jacobite Monophysitic Christian population had been hostile to Byzantium orthodoxy, and at times for that reason welcomed Muslim rule. There is no strong evidence for forced conversion, or that the jizya tax significantly affected such changes.

The demographic situation in Palestine was further altered by urban decline under the Abbasids, and it is thought that the 749 earthquake hastened this process by causing an increase in the number of Jews, Christians, and Samaritans who emigrated to diaspora communities while also leaving behind others who remained in the devastated cities and poor villages until they converted to Islam. Historical records and archeological evidence suggest that many Samaritans converted under Abbasid and Tulunid rule, after suffering through severe difficulties such droughts, earthquakes, religious persecution, heavy taxes and anarchy. The same region also saw the settlement of Arabs. Over the period, the Samaritan population drastically decreased, with the rural Samaritan population converting to Islam, and small urban communities remaining in Nablus and Caesarea, as well as in Cairo, Damascus, Aleppo and Sarepta. Nevertheless, the Muslim population remained a minority in a predominantly Christian area, and it is likely that this status persisted until the Crusader period.

== Crusades and Mongols ==
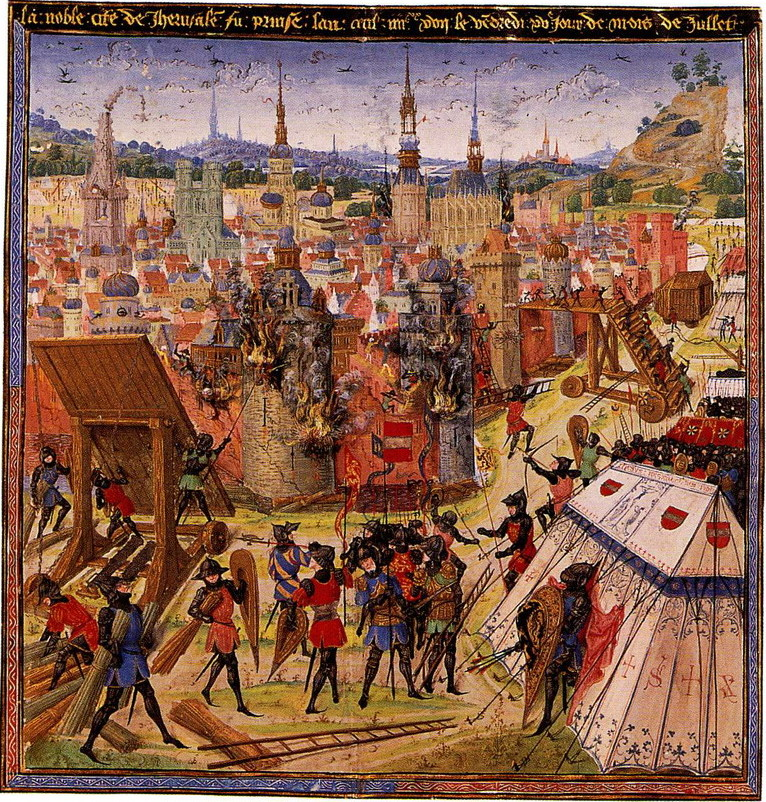
Painting of the siege of Jerusalem during the First Crusade (1099)

In 1095, Pope Urban II called upon Christians to wage a holy war and recapture Jerusalem from Muslim rule. Responding to this call, Christians launched the First Crusade in the same year, a military campaign aimed at retaking the Holy Land, ultimately resulting in the successful siege and conquest of Jerusalem in 1099. In the same year, the Crusaders conquered Beit She'an and Tiberias, and in the following decade, they captured coastal cities with the support of Italian city-state fleets, establishing these coastal ports as crucial strongholds for Crusader rule in the region.

Following the First Crusade, several Crusader states were established in the Levant, with the Kingdom of Jerusalem (Regnum Hierosolymitanum) assuming a preeminent position and enjoying special status among them. The population consisted predominantly of Muslims, Christians, Jews, and Samaritans, while the Crusaders remained a minority and relied on the local population who worked the soil. The region saw the construction of numerous robust castles and fortresses, yet efforts to establish permanent European villages proved unsuccessful.

Around 1180, Raynald of Châtillon, ruler of Transjordan, caused increasing conflict with the Ayyubid Sultan Saladin (Salah-al-Din), leading to the defeat of the Crusaders in the 1187 Battle of Hattin (above Tiberias). Saladin was able to peacefully take Jerusalem and conquered most of the former Kingdom of Jerusalem. Saladin's court physician was Maimonides, a refugee from Almohad (Muslim) persecution in Córdoba, Spain, where all non-Muslim religions had been banned.

The Christian world's response to the loss of Jerusalem came in the Third Crusade of 1190. After lengthy battles and negotiations, Richard the Lionheart and Saladin concluded the Treaty of Jaffa in 1192 whereby Christians were granted free passage to make pilgrimages to the holy sites, while Jerusalem remained under Muslim rule. In 1229, Jerusalem peacefully reverted into Christian control as part of a treaty between Holy Roman Emperor Frederick II and Ayyubid sultan al-Kamil that ended the Sixth Crusade. In 1244, Jerusalem was sacked by the Khwarezmian Tatars who decimated the city's Christian population, drove out the Jews and razed the city. The Khwarezmians were driven out by the Ayyubids in 1247.

== Mamluk period ==
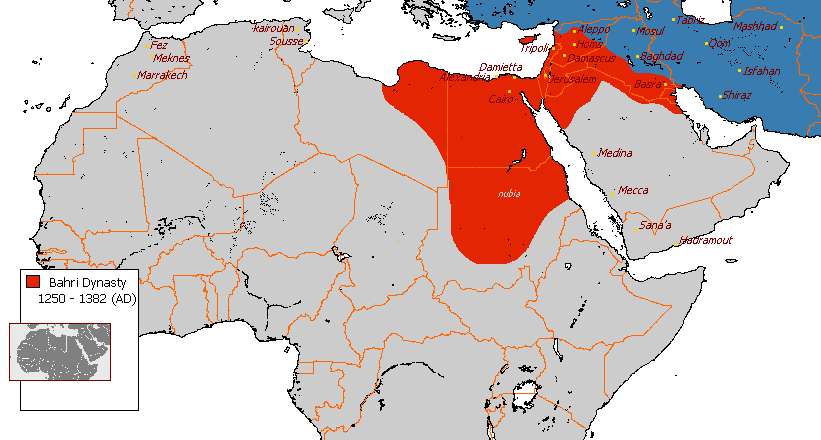
The Bahri Mamluk dynasty 1250–1382

Between 1258 and 1291, the area was the frontier between Mongol invaders (occasional Crusader allies) and the Mamluks of Egypt. The conflict impoverished the country and severely reduced the population. In Egypt a caste of warrior slaves, known as the Mamluks, gradually took control of the kingdom. The Mamluks were mostly of Turkish origin, and were bought as children and then trained in warfare. They were highly prized warriors, who gave rulers independence of the native aristocracy. In Egypt they took control of the kingdom following a failed invasion by the Crusaders (Seventh Crusade). The first Mamluk Sultan, Qutuz of Egypt, defeated the Mongols in the Battle of Ain Jalut ("Goliath's spring" near Ein Harod), ending the Mongol advances. He was assassinated by one of his Generals, Baibars, who went on to eliminate most of the Crusader outposts. The Mamluks ruled Palestine until 1516, regarding it as part of Syria. In Hebron, Jews were banned from worshipping at the Cave of the Patriarchs (the second-holiest site in Judaism); they were only allowed to enter 7 steps inside the site and the ban remained in place until Israel assumed control of the West Bank in the Six-Day War. The Egyptian Mamluk sultan Al-Ashraf Khalil conquered the last outpost of Crusader rule in 1291.

The Mamluks, continuing the policy of the Ayyubids, made the strategic decision to destroy the coastal area and to bring desolation to many of its cities, from Tyre in the north to Gaza in the south. Ports were destroyed and various materials were dumped to make them inoperable. The goal was to prevent attacks from the sea, given the fear of the return of the Crusaders. This had a long-term effect on those areas, which remained sparsely populated for centuries. The activity in that time concentrated more inland.

With the 1492 expulsion of Jews from Spain and 1497 persecution of Jews and Muslims by Manuel I of Portugal, many Jews moved eastward, with some deciding to settle in the Mamluk Palestine. As a consequence, the local Jewish community underwent significant rejuvenation. The influx of Sephardic Jews began under Mamluk rule in the 15th century, and continued throughout the 16th century and especially after the Ottoman conquest. As city-dwellers, the majority of Sephardic Jews preferred to settle in urban areas, mainly in Safed but also in Jerusalem, while the Musta'arbi community comprised the majority of the villagers' Jews.

== Ottoman period ==
Under the Mamluks, the area was a province of Bilad a-Sham (Syria). It was conquered by Turkish Sultan Selim I in 1516–17, becoming a part of the province of Ottoman Syria for the next four centuries, first as the Damascus Eyalet and later as the Syria Vilayet (following the Tanzimat reorganization of 1864).

=== Old Yishuv ===
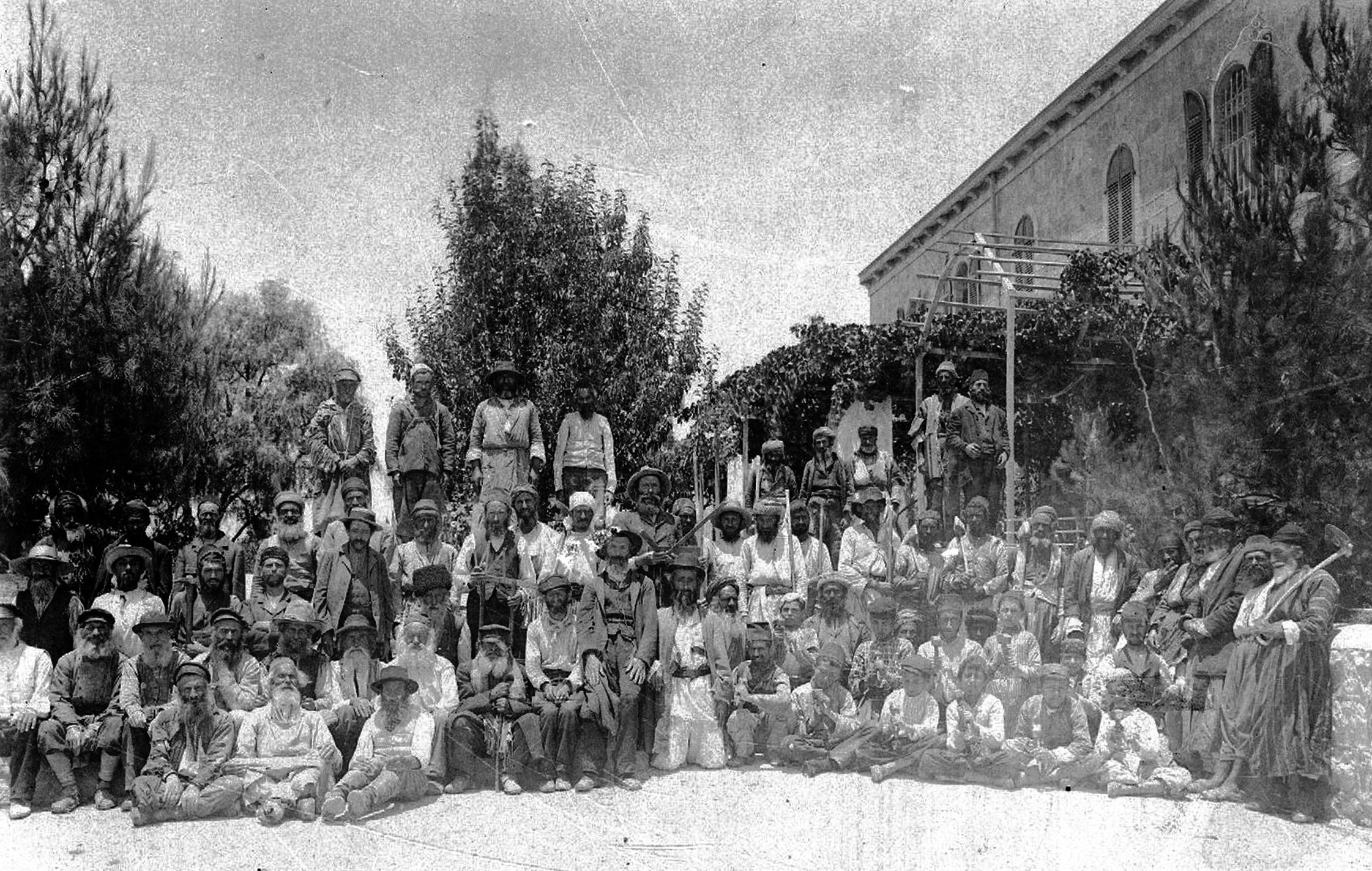
Jewish workers in Kerem Avraham neighbourhood of Jerusalem (c. 1850s)

With the more favorable conditions that followed the Ottoman conquest, the immigration of Jews fleeing Catholic Europe, which had already begun under Mamluk rule, continued, and soon an influx of exiled Sephardic Jews came to dominate the Jewish community in the area.

In 1558, Selim II (1566–1574), successor to Suleiman, whose wife Nurbanu Sultan was Jewish, gave control of Tiberias to Doña Gracia Mendes Nasi, one of the richest women in Europe and an escapee from the Inquisition. She encouraged Jewish refugees to settle in the area and established a Hebrew printing press. Safed became a centre for study of the Kabbalah and other Jewish religious studies, culminating with Joseph Karo's writing of the Shulchan Aruch – published in 1565 in Venice – which became the near-universal standard of Jewish religious law. Doña Nasi's nephew, Joseph Nasi, was made governor of Tiberias and he encouraged Jewish settlement from Italy.

In 1660, a Druze power struggle led to the destruction of Safed and Tiberias. In the late 18th century a local Arab sheikh, Zahir al-Umar, created a de facto independent Emirate in the Galilee. Ottoman attempts to subdue the Sheikh failed, but after Zahir's death the Ottomans restored their rule in the area.

In 1799, Napoleon briefly occupied the country and planned a proclamation inviting Jews to create a state. The proclamation was shelved following his defeat at Acre. In 1831, Muhammad Ali of Egypt, an Ottoman ruler who left the Empire and tried to modernize Egypt, conquered Ottoman Syria and imposed conscription, leading to the Arab revolt.

In 1838, there was another Druze revolt. In 1839 Moses Montefiore met with Muhammed Pasha in Egypt and signed an agreement to establish 100–200 Jewish villages in the Damascus Eyalet of Ottoman Syria, but in 1840 the Egyptians withdrew before the deal was implemented, returning the area to Ottoman governorship. In 1844, Jews constituted the largest population group in Jerusalem. By 1896 Jews constituted an absolute majority in Jerusalem, but the overall population in Palestine was 88% Muslim and 9% Christian.

=== Birth of Zionism ===
Between 1882 and 1903, approximately 35,000 Jews moved to Palestine, known as the First Aliyah. In the Russian Empire, Jews faced growing persecution and legal restrictions. Half the world's Jews lived in the Russian Empire, where they were restricted to living in the Pale of Settlement. Severe pogroms in the early 1880s and legal repression led to 2 million Jews emigrating from the Russian Empire. 1.5 million went to the United States. Popular destinations were also Germany, France, the United Kingdom, the Netherlands, Argentina and Palestine.

The Zionist movement began in earnest in 1882 with Leon Pinsker's pamphlet Auto-Emancipation, which argued for the creation of a Jewish national homeland as a means to avoid the violence plaguing Jewish communities in Eastern Europe. At the 1884 Katowice Conference, Russian Jews established the Bilu and Hovevei Zion ("Lovers of Zion") movements with the aim of settling in Palestine. In 1878, Russian Jewish emigrants established the village of Petah Tikva ("The Beginning of Hope"), followed by Rishon LeZion ("First to Zion") in 1882. The existing Ashkenazi communities were concentrated in the Four Holy Cities, extremely poor and relied on donations (halukka) from groups abroad, while the new settlements were small farming communities, but still relied on funding by the French Baron, Edmond James de Rothschild, who sought to establish profitable enterprises. Many early migrants could not find work and left, but despite the problems, more settlements arose and the community grew. After the Ottoman conquest of Yemen in 1881, a large number of Yemenite Jews also emigrated to Palestine, often driven by Messianism.

In 1896 Theodor Herzl published Der Judenstaat (The Jewish State), in which he asserted that the solution to growing antisemitism in Europe (the so-called "Jewish Question") was to establish a Jewish state. In 1897, the World Zionist Organization was founded and the First Zionist Congress proclaimed its aim "to establish a home for the Jewish people in Palestine secured under public law." The Congress chose Hatikvah ("The Hope") as its anthem.

Between 1904 and 1914, around 40,000 Jews settled in the area now known as Israel (the Second Aliyah). In 1908, the World Zionist Organization set up the Palestine Bureau (also known as the "Eretz Israel Office") in Jaffa and began to adopt a systematic Jewish settlement policy. In 1909, residents of Jaffa bought land outside the city walls and built the first entirely Hebrew-speaking town, Ahuzat Bayit (later renamed Tel Aviv).

In 1915–1916, Talaat Pasha of the Young Turks forced around a million Armenian Christians from their homes in Eastern Turkey, marching them south through Syria, in what is now known as the Armenian genocide. The number of dead is thought to be around 700,000. Hundreds of thousands were forcibly converted to Islam. A community of survivors settled in Jerusalem, one of whom developed the now iconic Armenian pottery.

=== World War I ===
Occupied Enemy Territory Administration, 1918

During World War I, most Jews supported the Germans because they were fighting the Russians who were regarded as the Jews' main enemy. In Britain, the government sought Jewish support for the war effort for a variety of reasons including an antisemitic perception of "Jewish power" in the Ottoman Empire's Young Turks movement which was based in Thessaloniki, the most Jewish city in Europe (40% of the 160,000 population were Jewish). The British also hoped to secure American Jewish support for US intervention on Britain's behalf.

There was already sympathy for the aims of Zionism in the British government, including the Prime Minister Lloyd George. Over 14,000 Jews were expelled by the Ottoman military commander from the Jaffa area in 1914–1915, due to suspicions they were subjects of Russia, an enemy, or Zionists wishing to detach Palestine from the Ottoman Empire, and when the entire population, including Muslims, of both Jaffa and Tel Aviv was subject to an expulsion order in April 1917, the affected Jews could not return until the British conquest ended in 1918, which drove the Turks out of Southern Syria. A year prior, in 1917, the British foreign minister, Arthur Balfour, sent a public letter to the British Lord Rothschild, a leading member of his party and leader of the Jewish community. The letter subsequently became known as the Balfour Declaration. It stated that the British Government "view[ed] with favour the establishment in Palestine of a national home for the Jewish people". The declaration provided the British government with a pretext for claiming and governing the country. New Middle Eastern boundaries were decided by an agreement between British and French bureaucrats.

A Jewish Legion composed largely of Zionist volunteers organized by Ze'ev Jabotinsky and Joseph Trumpeldor participated in the British invasion. It also participated in the failed Gallipoli Campaign. The Nili Zionist spy network provided the British with details of Ottoman plans and troop concentrations.

The Ottoman Empire chose to ally itself with Germany when the first war began. Arab leaders dreamed of freeing themselves from Ottoman rule and establishing self-government or forming an independent Arab state. Therefore, Britain contacted Hussein bin Ali of the Kingdom of Hejaz and proposed cooperation. Together they organized the Arab revolt that Britain supplied with very large quantities of rifles and ammunition. In cooperation between British artillery and Arab infantry, the city of Aqaba on the Red Sea was conquered. The Arab army then continued north while Britain attacked the ottomans from the sea. In 1917–1918, Jerusalem and Damascus were conquered from the ottomans. Britain then broke off cooperation with the Arab army. It turned out that Britain had already entered into the secret Sykes–Picot Agreement that meant that only Britain and France would be allowed to administer the land conquered from the Ottoman Empire.

After pushing out the Ottomans, Palestine came under martial law. The British, French and Arab Occupied Enemy Territory Administration governed the area shortly before the armistice with the Ottomans until the promulgation of the mandate in 1920.

== Mandatory Palestine ==
=== First years ===
The British Mandate (in effect, British rule) of Palestine, including the Balfour Declaration, was confirmed by the League of Nations in 1922 and came into effect in 1923. The territory of Transjordan was also covered by the Mandate but under separate rules that excluded it from the Balfour Declaration. Britain signed a treaty with the United States (which did not join the League of Nations) in which the United States endorsed the terms of the Mandate, which was approved unanimously by both the U.S. Senate and House of Representatives.

The Balfour declaration was published on the 2nd of November 1917 and the Bolsheviks seized control of Russia a week later. This led to civil war in the Russian Empire. Between 1918 and 1921, a series of pogroms led to the death of at least 100,000 Jews (mainly in what is now Ukraine), and the displacement as refugees of a further 600,000. This led to further migration to Palestine. Between 1919 and 1923, some 40,000 Jews arrived in Palestine in what is known as the Third Aliyah. Many of the Jewish immigrants of this period were Socialist Zionists and supported the Bolsheviks. The migrants became known as pioneers (halutzim), experienced or trained in agriculture who established self-sustaining communes called kibbutzim. Malarial marshes in the Jezreel Valley and Hefer Plain were drained and converted to agricultural use. Land was bought by the Jewish National Fund, a Zionist charity that collected money abroad for that purpose.

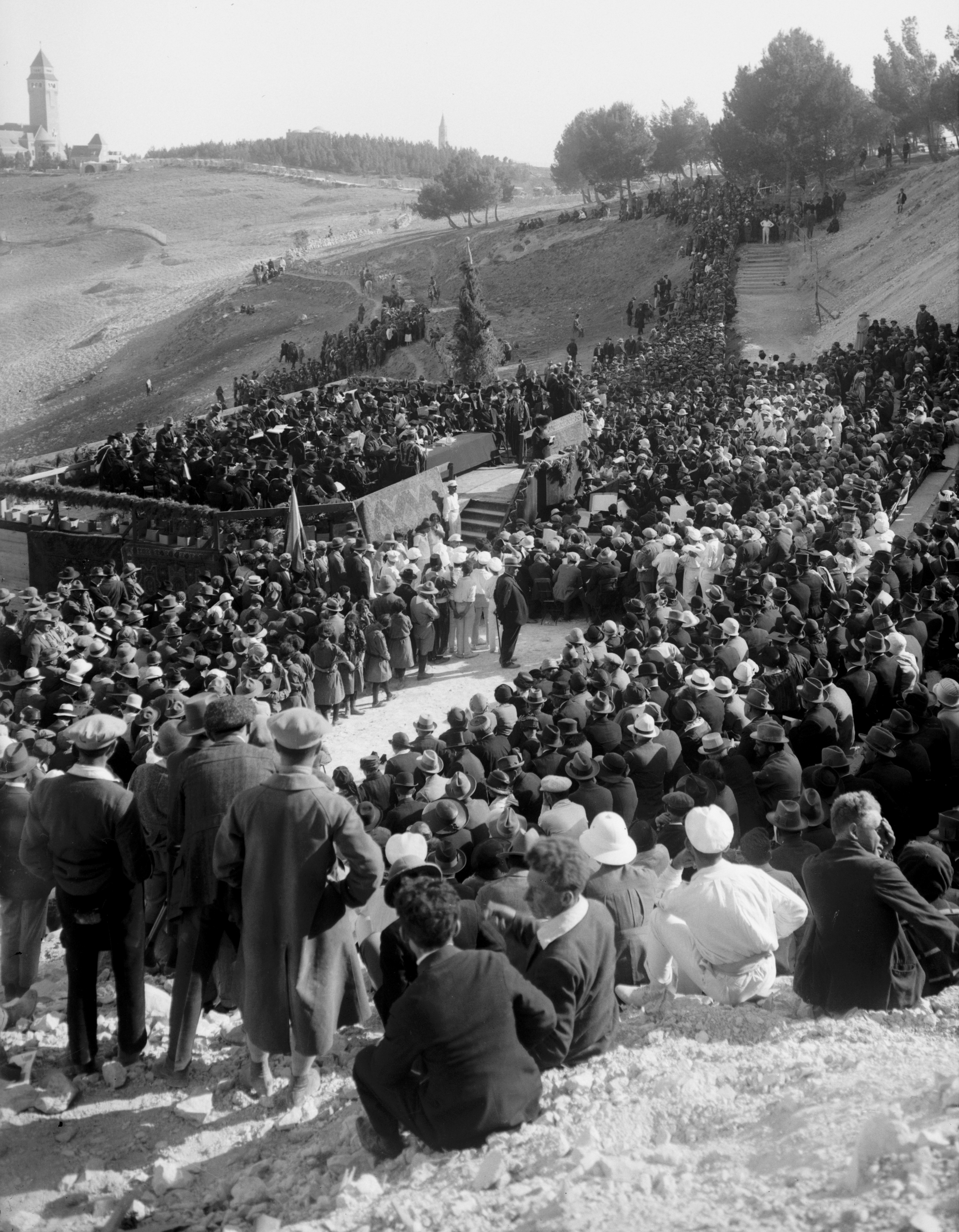
The opening ceremony of The Hebrew University of Jerusalem visited by Arthur Balfour, 1 April 1925

After the French victory over the Arab Kingdom of Syria ended hopes of Arab independence, there were clashes between Arabs and Jews in Jerusalem during the 1920 Nebi Musa riots and in Jaffa the following year, leading to the establishment of the Haganah underground Jewish militia. A Jewish Agency was created which issued the entry permits granted by the British and distributed funds donated by Jews abroad. Between 1924 and 1929, over 80,000 Jews arrived in the Fourth Aliyah, fleeing antisemitism and heavy tax burdens imposed on trade in Poland and Hungary, inspired by Zionism and motivated by the closure of United States borders by the Immigration Act of 1924 which severely limited immigration from Eastern and Southern Europe.

Pinhas Rutenberg, a former Commissar of St Petersburg in Russia's pre-Bolshevik Kerensky Government, built the first electricity generators in Palestine. In 1925, the Jewish Agency established the Hebrew University in Jerusalem and the Technion (technological university) in Haifa. British authorities introduced the Palestine pound (worth 1000 "mils") in 1927, replacing the Egyptian pound as the unit of currency in the Mandate.

From 1928, the democratically elected Va'ad Leumi (Jewish National Council or JNC) became the main administrative institution of the Palestine Jewish community (Yishuv) and included non-Zionist Jews. As the Yishuv grew, the JNC adopted more government-type functions, such as education, health care, and security. With British permission, the Va'ad Leumi raised its own taxes and ran independent services for the Jewish population.

In 1929, tensions grew over the Kotel (Wailing Wall), the holiest spot in the world for modern Judaism, which was then a narrow alleyway where the British banned Jews from using chairs or curtains: Many of the worshippers were elderly and needed seats; they also wanted to separate women from men. The Mufti of Jerusalem said it was Muslim property and deliberately had cattle driven through the alley. He alleged that the Jews were seeking control of the Temple Mount. This provided the spark for the August 1929 Palestine riots. The main victims were the (non-Zionist) ancient Jewish community at Hebron, who were massacred. The riots led to right-wing Zionists establishing their own militia in 1931, the Irgun Tzvai Leumi (National Military Organization, known in Hebrew by its acronym "Etzel"), which was committed to a more aggressive policy towards the Arab population.

During the interwar period, the perception grew that there was an irreconciliable tension between the two Mandatory functions, of providing for a Jewish homeland in Palestine, and the goal of preparing the country for self-determination. The British rejected the principle of majority rule or any other measure that would give the Arab population, who formed the majority of the population, control over Palestinian territory.

=== Increase in Jewish immigration ===
Between 1929 and 1938, 250,000 Jews arrived in Palestine (Fifth Aliyah). In 1933, the Jewish Agency and the Nazis negotiated the Ha'avara Agreement (transfer agreement), under which 50,000 German Jews would be transferred to Palestine. The Jews' possessions were confiscated and in return the Nazis allowed the Ha'avara organization to purchase 14 million pounds worth of German goods for export to Palestine and use it to compensate the immigrants. Although many Jews wanted to leave Nazi Germany, the Nazis prevented Jews from taking any money and restricted them to two suitcases so few could pay the British entry tax. The agreement was controversial and the Labour Zionist leader who negotiated the agreement, Haim Arlosoroff, was assassinated in Tel Aviv in 1933. The assassination was used by the British to create tension between the Zionist left and the Zionist right. Arlosoroff had been the boyfriend of Magda Ritschel some years before she married Joseph Goebbels. There has been speculation that he was assassinated by the Nazis to hide the connection but there is no evidence for it.

Between 1933 and 1936, 174,000 arrived despite the large sums the British demanded for immigration permits: Jews had to prove they had 1,000 pounds for families with capital (equivalent to £61,105 in 2025), 500 pounds if they had a profession and 250 pounds if they were skilled labourers.

=== Arab revolt and the White Paper ===
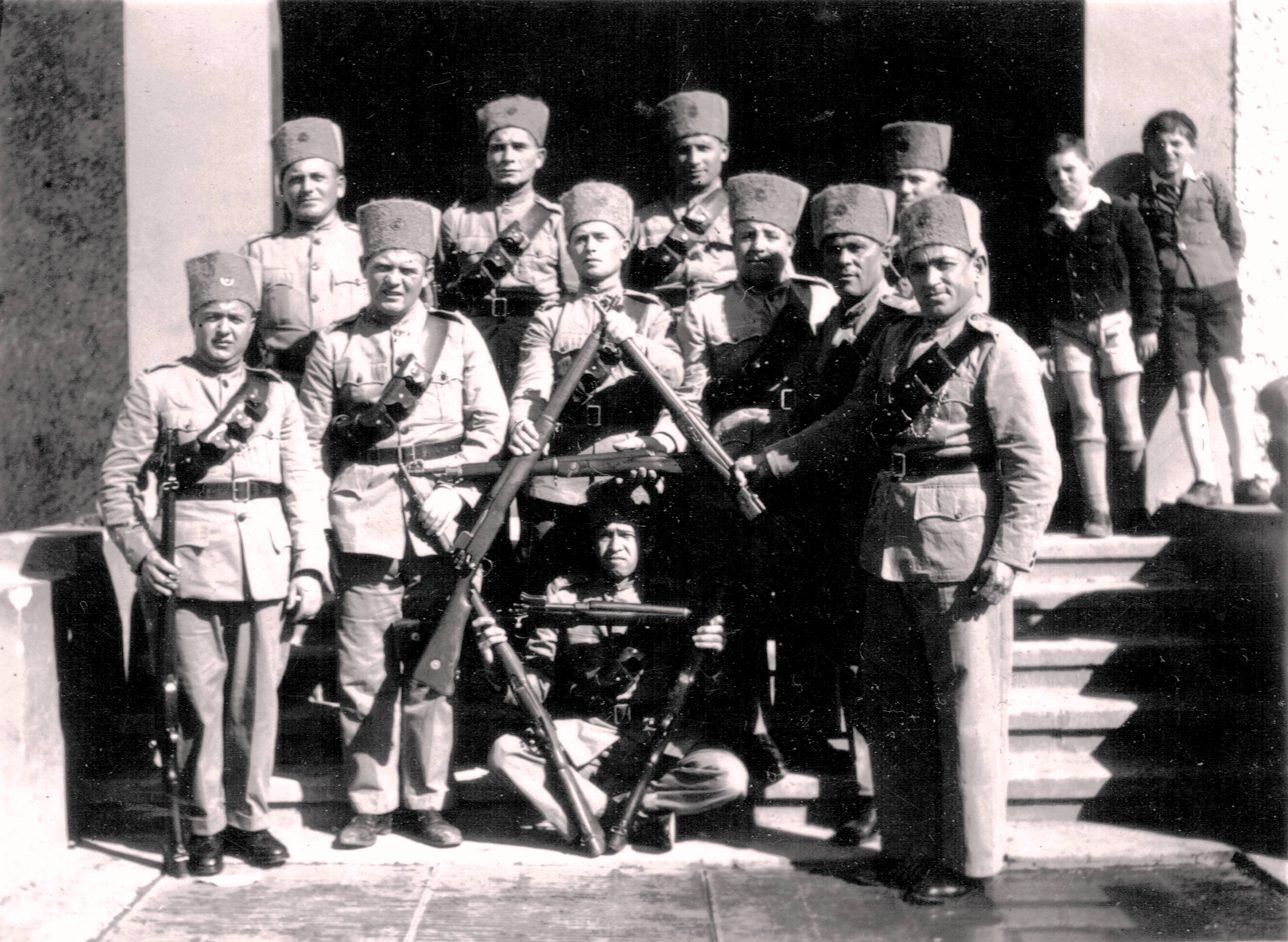
Jewish Settlement Police members watching the settlement Nesher during 1936–1939 Arab revolt

Jewish immigration and Nazi propaganda contributed to the large-scale 1936–1939 Arab revolt in Palestine, a largely nationalist uprising directed at ending British rule. The head of the Jewish Agency, Ben-Gurion, responded to the Arab Revolt with a policy of "Havlagah"—self-restraint and a refusal to be provoked by Arab attacks in order to prevent polarization. The Etzel group broke off from the Haganah in opposition to this policy.

The British responded to the revolt with the Peel Commission (1936–37), a public inquiry that recommended that an exclusively Jewish territory be created in the Galilee and western coast (including the population transfer of 225,000 Arabs); the rest becoming an exclusively Arab area. The two main Jewish leaders, Chaim Weizmann and David Ben-Gurion, had convinced the Zionist Congress to approve equivocally the Peel recommendations as a basis for more negotiation. The plan was rejected outright by the Palestinian Arab leadership and they renewed the revolt, which caused the British to abandon the plan as unworkable.

Testifying before the Peel Commission, Weizmann said "There are in Europe 6,000,000 people ... for whom the world is divided into places where they cannot live and places where they cannot enter." In 1938, the US called an international conference to address the question of the vast numbers of Jews trying to escape Europe. Britain made its attendance contingent on Palestine being kept out of the discussion. No Jewish representatives were invited. The Nazis proposed their own solution: that the Jews of Europe be shipped to Madagascar (the Madagascar Plan). The agreement proved fruitless, and the Jews were stuck in Europe.

With millions of Jews trying to leave Europe and every country closed to Jewish migration, the British decided to close Palestine. The White Paper of 1939, recommended that an independent Palestine, governed jointly by Arabs and Jews, be established within 10 years. The White Paper agreed to allow 75,000 Jewish immigrants into Palestine over the period 1940–44, after which migration would require Arab approval. Both the Arab and Jewish leadership rejected the White Paper. In March 1940 the British High Commissioner for Palestine issued an edict banning Jews from purchasing land in 95% of Palestine. Jews now resorted to illegal immigration: (Aliyah Bet or "Ha'apalah"), often organized by the Mossad Le'aliyah Bet and the Irgun. With no outside help and no countries ready to admit them, very few Jews managed to escape Europe between 1939 and 1945. Those caught by the British were mostly imprisoned in Mauritius.

=== World War II and the Holocaust ===
Jewish Brigade headquarters under both Union Flag and Jewish flag

During the Second World War, the Jewish Agency worked to establish a Jewish army that would fight alongside the British forces. Churchill supported the plan but British military and government opposition led to its rejection. The British demanded that the number of Jewish recruits match the number of Arab recruits.

In June 1940, Italy declared war on the British Commonwealth and sided with Germany. Within a month, Italian planes bombed Tel Aviv and Haifa, inflicting multiple casualties. In May 1941, the Palmach was established to defend the Yishuv against the planned Axis invasion through North Africa. The British refusal to provide arms to the Jews, even when Rommel's forces were advancing through Egypt in June 1942 (intent on occupying Palestine), and the 1939 White Paper led to the emergence of a Zionist leadership in Palestine that believed conflict with Britain was inevitable. Despite this, the Jewish Agency called on Palestine's Jewish youth to volunteer for the British Army. 30,000 Palestinian Jews and 12,000 Palestinian Arabs enlisted in the British armed forces during the war. In June 1944 the British agreed to create a Jewish Brigade that would fight in Italy.

Approximately 1.5 million Jews around the world served in every branch of the allied armies, mainly in the Soviet and US armies. 200,000 Jews died serving in the Soviet army alone.

A small group (about 200 activists), dedicated to resisting the British administration in Palestine, broke away from the Etzel (which advocated support for Britain during the war) and formed the "Lehi" (Stern Gang), led by Avraham Stern. In 1942, the USSR released the Revisionist Zionist leader Menachem Begin from the Gulag and he went to Palestine, taking command of the Etzel organization with a policy of increased conflict against the British. At about the same time Yitzhak Shamir escaped from the camp in Eritrea where the British were holding Lehi activists without trial, taking command of the Lehi (Stern Gang).

Jews in the Middle East were also affected by the war. Most of North Africa came under Nazi control and many Jews were used as slaves. The 1941 pro-Axis coup in Iraq was accompanied by massacres of Jews. The Jewish Agency put together plans for a last stand in the event of Rommel invading Palestine (the Nazis planned to exterminate Palestine's Jews).

Between 1939 and 1945, the Nazis, aided by local forces, led systematic efforts to kill every person of Jewish extraction in Europe (The Holocaust), causing the deaths of approximately 6 million Jews. A quarter of those killed were children. The Polish and German Jewish communities, which played an important role in defining the pre-1945 Jewish world, mostly ceased to exist. In the United States and Palestine, Jews of European origin became disconnected from their families and roots. As the Holocaust mainly affected Ashkenazi Jews, Sepharadi and Mizrahi Jews, who had been a minority, became a much more significant factor in the Jewish world. Those Jews who survived in central Europe, were displaced persons (refugees); an Anglo-American Committee of Inquiry, established to examine the Palestine issue, surveyed their ambitions and found that over 95% wanted to migrate to Palestine.

In the Zionist movement the moderate Pro-British (and British citizen) Weizmann, whose son died flying in the RAF, was undermined by Britain's anti-Zionist policies. Leadership of the movement passed to the Jewish Agency in Palestine, now led by the anti-British Socialist-Zionist party (Mapai) led by David Ben-Gurion.

=== Illegal Jewish immigration and insurgency ===
The British Empire was severely weakened by the war. In the Middle East, the war had made Britain conscious of its dependence on Arab oil. Shortly after VE Day, the Labour Party won the general election in Britain. Although Labour Party conferences had for years called for the establishment of a Jewish state in Palestine, the Labour government now decided to maintain the 1939 White Paper policies.

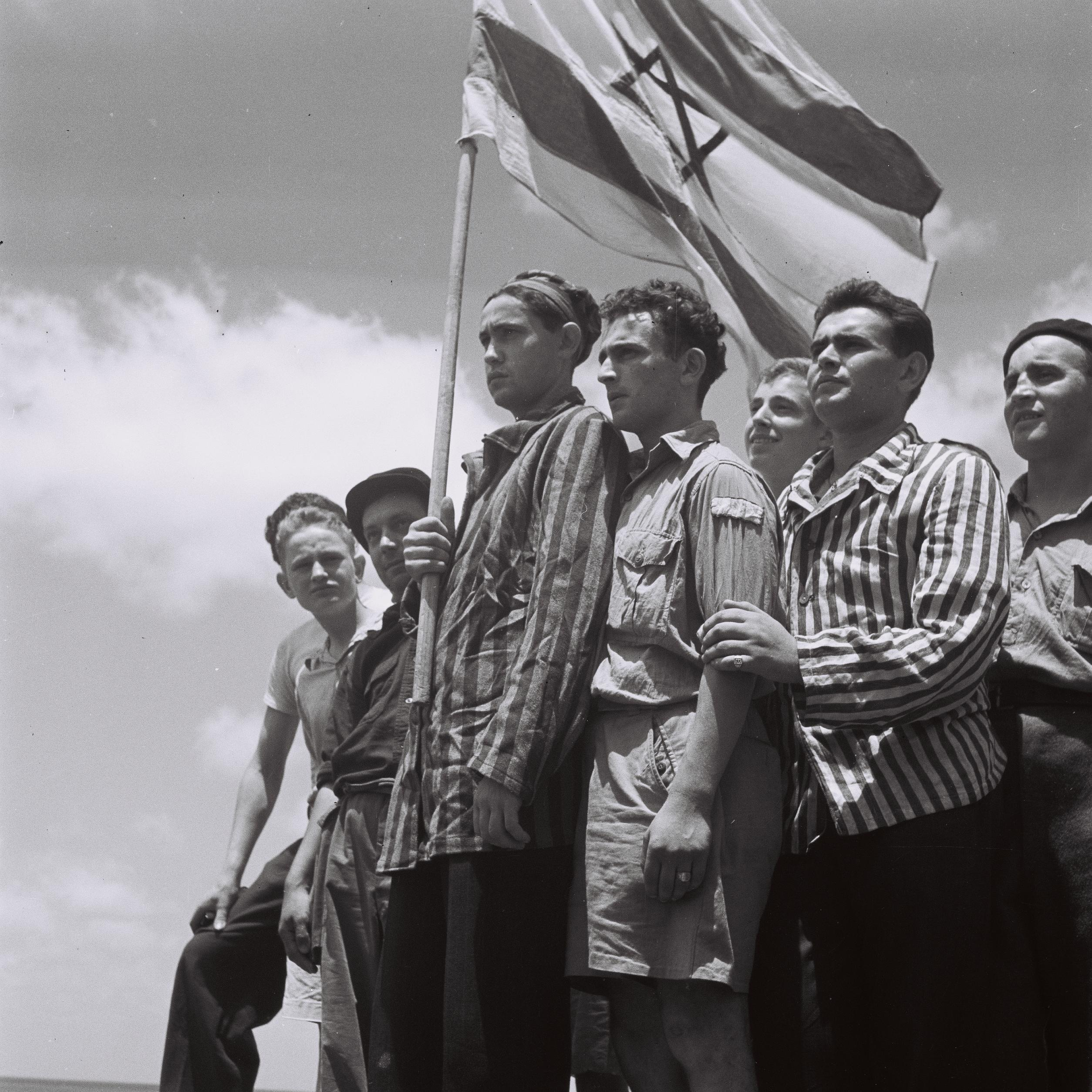
Buchenwald survivors arrive in Haifa to be arrested by the British, 15 July 1945

Illegal migration (Aliyah Bet) became the main form of Jewish entry into Palestine. Across Europe Bricha ("flight"), an organization of former partisans and ghetto fighters, smuggled Holocaust survivors from Eastern Europe to Mediterranean ports, where small boats tried to breach the British blockade of Palestine. Meanwhile, Jews from Arab countries began moving into Palestine overland. Despite British efforts to curb immigration, during the 14 years of the Aliyah Bet, over 110,000 Jews entered Palestine. By the end of World War II, the Jewish population of Palestine had increased to 33% of the total population.

In an effort to win independence, Zionists now waged a guerrilla war against the British. The main underground Jewish militia, the Haganah, formed an alliance called the Jewish Resistance Movement with the Etzel and Stern Gang to fight the British. In June 1946, following instances of Jewish sabotage, such as in the Night of the Bridges, the British launched Operation Agatha, arresting 2,700 Jews, including the leadership of the Jewish Agency, whose headquarters were raided. Those arrested were held without trial.

On 4 July 1946 a massive pogrom in Poland led to a wave of Holocaust survivors fleeing Europe for Palestine. Three weeks later, Irgun bombed the British Military Headquarters of the King David Hotel in Jerusalem, killing 91 people. In the days following the bombing, Tel Aviv was placed under curfew and over 120,000 Jews, nearly 20% of the Jewish population of Palestine, were questioned by the police. In the US, Congress criticized British handling of the situation and considered delaying loans that were vital to British post-war recovery. The alliance between Haganah and Etzel was dissolved after the King David bombings.

Between 1945 and 1948, 100,000–120,000 Jews left Poland. Their departure was largely organized by Zionist activists under the umbrella of the semi-clandestine organization Berihah ("Flight"). Berihah was also responsible for the organized emigration of Jews from Romania, Hungary, Czechoslovakia and Yugoslavia, totalling 250,000 (including Poland) Holocaust survivors. The British imprisoned the Jews trying to enter Palestine in the Atlit detainee camp and Cyprus internment camps. Those held were mainly Holocaust survivors, including large numbers of children and orphans. In response to Cypriot fears that the Jews would never leave and because the 75,000 quota established by the 1939 White Paper had never been filled, the British allowed the refugees to enter Palestine at a rate of 750 per month.

=== United Nations Partition Plan ===
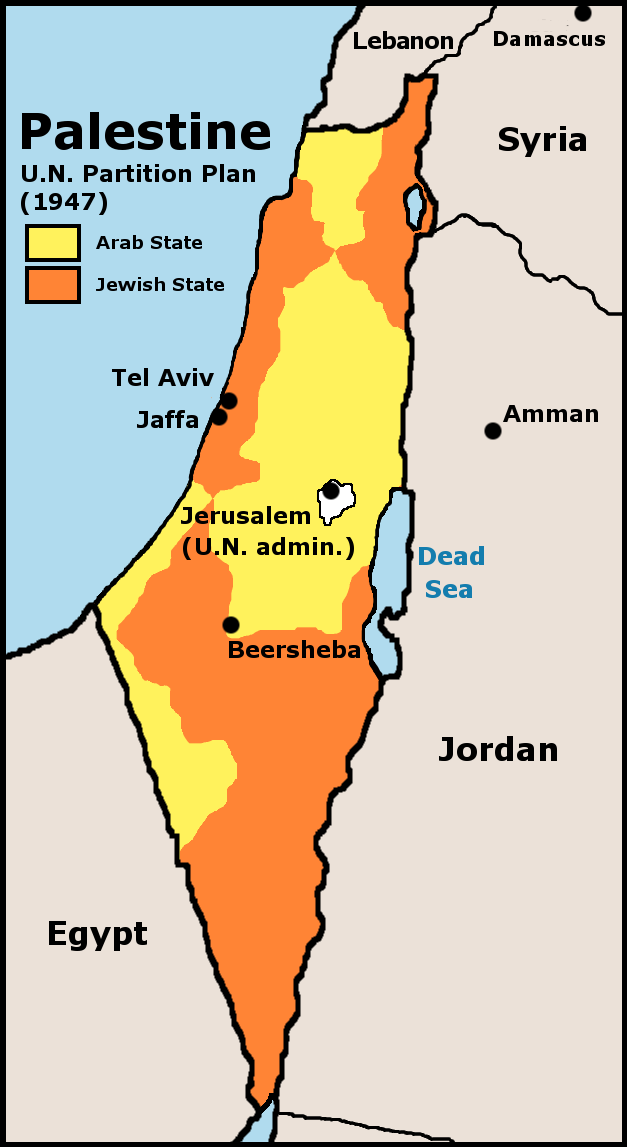
United Nations Partition Plan for Palestine, 1947

On 2 April 1947, the United Kingdom requested that the question of Palestine be handled by the General Assembly. The General Assembly created a committee, United Nations Special Committee on Palestine (UNSCOP), to report on "the question of Palestine". In July 1947 the UNSCOP visited Palestine and met with Jewish and Zionist delegations. The Arab Higher Committee boycotted the meetings. During the visit the British Foreign Secretary Ernest Bevin ordered that passengers from an Aliyah Bet ship, SS Exodus 1947, be sent back to Europe. The Holocaust surviving migrants on the ship were forcibly removed by British troops at Hamburg, Germany.

The principal non-Zionist Orthodox Jewish (or Haredi) party, Agudat Israel, recommended to UNSCOP that a Jewish state be set up after reaching a religious status quo agreement with Ben-Gurion. The agreement granted an exemption from military service to a quota of yeshiva (religious seminary) students and to all Orthodox women, made the Sabbath the national weekend, guaranteed kosher food in government institutions and allowed Orthodox Jews to maintain a separate education system.

The majority report of UNSCOP proposed "an independent Arab State, an independent Jewish State, and the City of Jerusalem", the last to be under "an International Trusteeship System". On 29 November 1947, in Resolution 181 (II), the General Assembly adopted the majority report of UNSCOP, but with slight modifications. The Plan also called for the British to allow "substantial" Jewish migration by 1 February 1948.

Neither Britain nor the UN Security Council took any action to implement the recommendation made by the resolution and Britain continued detaining Jews attempting to enter Palestine. Concerned that partition would severely damage Anglo-Arab relations, Britain denied UN representatives access to Palestine during the period between the adoption of Resolution 181 (II) and the termination of the British Mandate. The British withdrawal was completed in May 1948. However, Britain continued to hold Jewish immigrants of "fighting age" and their families on Cyprus until March 1949.

=== Civil War ===
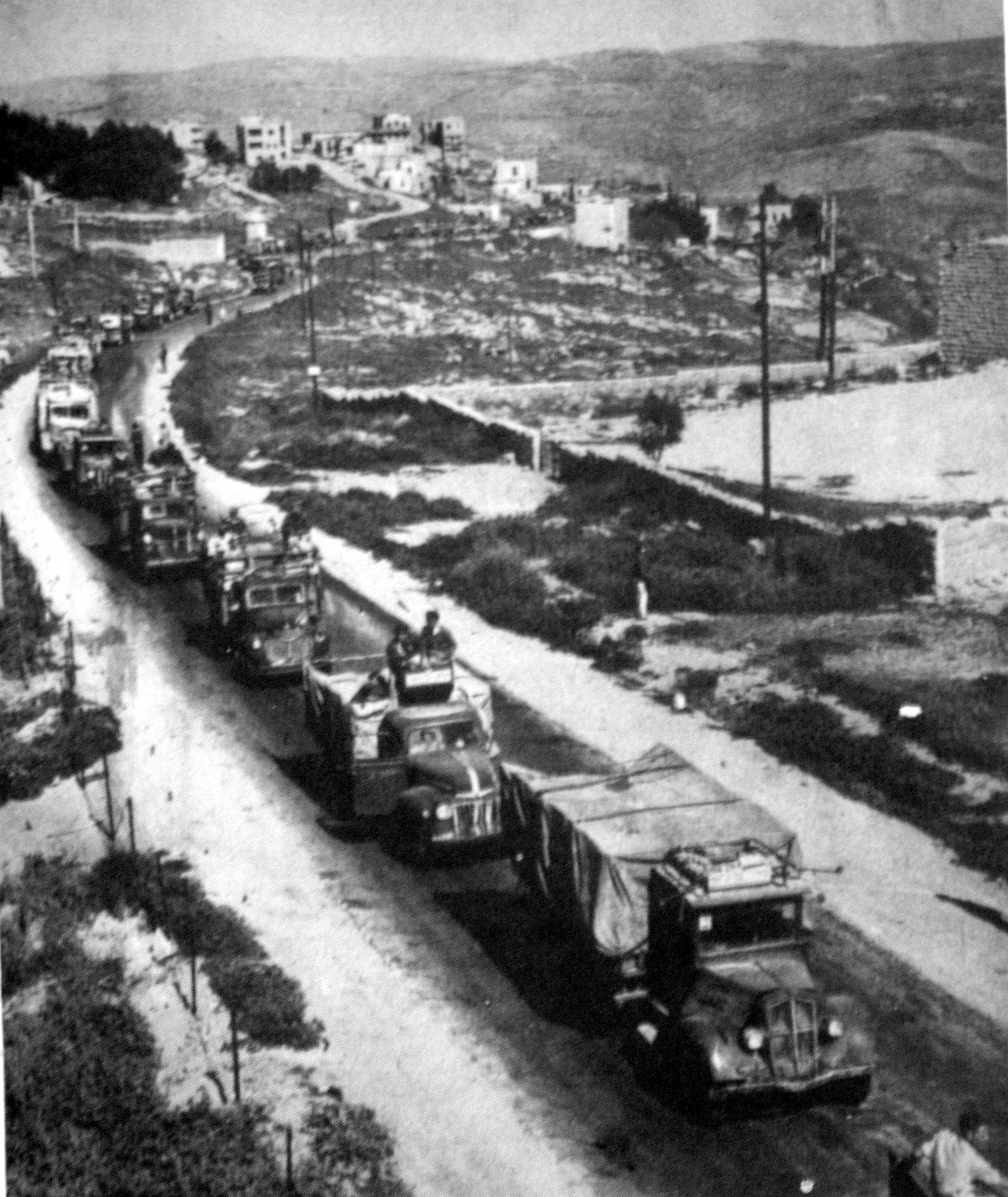
Supply convoy on its way to besieged Jerusalem, April 1948

The General Assembly's vote caused joy in the Jewish community and anger in the Arab community. Violence broke out between the sides, escalating into civil war. From January 1948, operations became increasingly militarized, with the intervention of a number of Arab Liberation Army regiments inside Palestine, each active in a variety of distinct sectors around the different coastal towns. They consolidated their presence in Galilee and Samaria. Abd al-Qadir al-Husayni came from Egypt with several hundred men of the Army of the Holy War. Having recruited a few thousand volunteers, he organized the blockade of the 100,000 Jewish residents of Jerusalem. The Yishuv tried to supply the city using convoys of up to 100 armoured vehicles, but largely failed. By March, almost all Haganah's armoured vehicles had been destroyed, the blockade was in full operation, and hundreds of Haganah members who had tried to bring supplies into the city were killed.

Up to 100,000 Arabs, from the urban upper and middle classes in Haifa, Jaffa and Jerusalem, or Jewish-dominated areas, evacuated abroad or to Arab centres eastwards. This situation caused the US to withdraw their support for the Partition plan, thus encouraging the Arab League to believe that the Palestinian Arabs, reinforced by the Arab Liberation Army, could put an end to the plan for partition. The British, on the other hand, decided on 7 February 1948 to support the annexation of the Arab part of Palestine by Transjordan. The Jordanian army was commanded by the British.

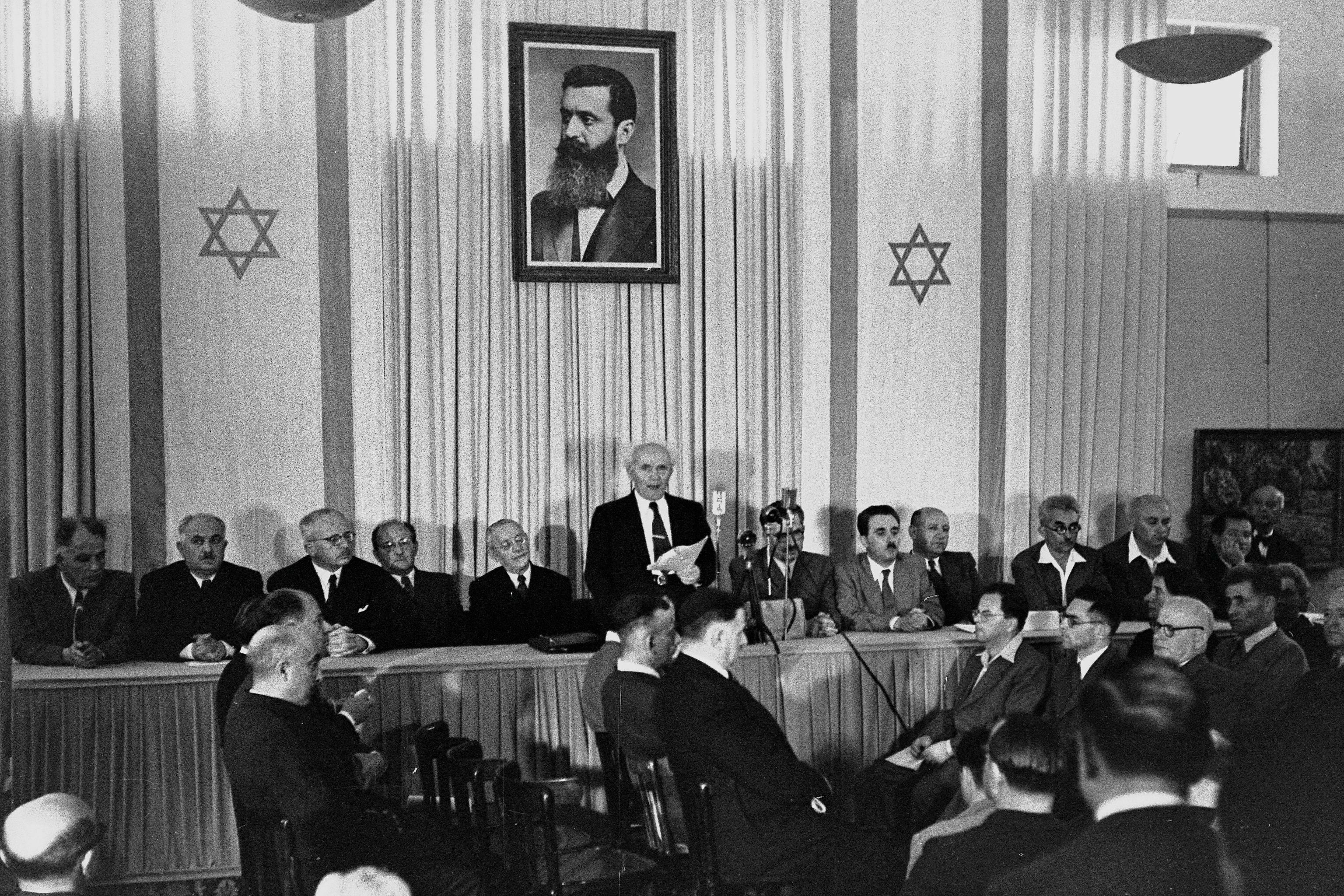
David Ben-Gurion proclaiming the Israeli Declaration of Independence in 1948

David Ben-Gurion reorganized the Haganah and made conscription obligatory. Every Jewish man and woman in the country had to receive military training. Thanks to funds raised by Golda Meir from sympathisers in the United States, and Stalin's decision to support the Zionist cause, the Jewish representatives of Palestine were able to purchase important arms in Eastern Europe.

Ben-Gurion gave Yigael Yadin the responsibility to plan for the announced intervention of the Arab states. The result of his analysis was Plan Dalet, in which Haganah passed from the defensive to the offensive. The plan sought to establish Jewish territorial continuity by conquering mixed zones. Tiberias, Haifa, Safed, Beisan, Jaffa and Acre fell, resulting in the flight of more than 250,000 Palestinian Arabs.

On 14 May 1948, on the day the last British forces left Haifa, the Jewish People's Council gathered at the Tel Aviv Museum and proclaimed the establishment of a Jewish state, to be known as the State of Israel.

== State of Israel ==
In 1948, following the 1947–1948 war in Mandatory Palestine, the Israeli Declaration of Independence sparked the 1948 Arab–Israeli War. This resulted in the 1948 Palestinian expulsion and flight from the land that the State of Israel came to control, and led to waves of Jewish immigration from other parts of the Middle East.

The latter half of the 20th century saw further conflicts between Israel and its neighbouring Arab nations. In 1967, the Six-Day War erupted; in its aftermath, Israel captured and occupied the Golan Heights from Syria, the West Bank from Jordan, and the Gaza Strip and the Sinai Peninsula from Egypt. In 1973, the Yom Kippur War began with an attack by Egypt on the Israeli-occupied Sinai Peninsula.

In 1979, the Egypt–Israel peace treaty was signed, based on the Camp David Accords. In 1993, Israel signed the Oslo I Accord with the Palestine Liberation Organization, which was followed by the establishment of the Palestinian National Authority. In 1994, the Israel–Jordan peace treaty was signed. Despite efforts to finalize a peace agreement, the conflict has continued.

== Demographics ==
Population of the Land of Israel 65–650
	65	100	150	300	550	650
Estimated Jewish Population (thousands)	2,500	1,800	1,200	500	200	100
Estimated Total Population	3,000	2,300	1,800	1,100	1,500	1,500

Development of Israel by decade
	1950	1960	1970	1980	1990	2000	2010	2020
Population (thousands)	1,370.1	2,150.4	3,022.1	3,921.7	4,821.7	6,369.3	7,695.1	9,097.0
World Jewry percentage	6%	15%	20%	25%	30%	38%	42%	44%
GDP per capita (current US$)		1,366	1,806	5,617	11,264	19,859	28,522	34,788

== See also ==
- Archaeology of Israel
- Hebrew calendar
- History of the Arab–Israeli conflict
- History of the Israel Defense Forces
- History of Jerusalem
- History of the Jews and Judaism in the Land of Israel
- History of the Middle East
- History of Palestine
- History of Zionism
- Jewish history
- Jewish military history
- Levantine archaeology
- LGBT history in Israel
- List of Israeli museums
- List of Jewish leaders in the Land of Israel
- List of years in Israel
- Time periods in the Palestine region
- Timeline of Israeli history
- Timeline of the Palestine region
