= The Origins of Judaism (book) =

Book by Yonatan Adler

The Origins of Judaism: An Archaeological-Historical Reappraisal
- Author: Yonatan Adler
- Subject: Origins of Judaism
- Genre: Non-fiction
- Publisher: Yale University Press
- Publication date: 15 November 2022
- Media type: Print
- Pages: 384
- ISBN: 978-0-300-26837-9
- Website: Yale University Press listing

The Origins of Judaism: An Archaeological-Historical Reappraisal is a 2022 book by Israeli professor of archaeology and ordained rabbi Yonatan Adler of Ariel University. The book examines the archaeological and historiographical record of Jewish religious practice, concluding that widespread adoption of the Torah as a binding law code probably originated in the time of the Hasmonean dynasty, in the 2nd–1st centuries BCE. Adler's work challenges a traditional scholarly dating of the emergence of Jewish religion to the periods of major Hebrew Bible composition, such as the late Iron Age, Babylonian exile, and early Second Temple periods, centuries before the Hasmoneans.

== Contents ==
In the book's introduction, Adler writes: "The aim of the present book is to investigate when and how the ancestors of today's Jews first came to know about the regulations of the Torah, to regard these rules as authoritative law, and to put these laws into actual practice in their daily lives." The establishment of Torah law as ordinary religious practice forms the basis for Adler's definition of Judaism. Adler then conducts a review of scholarship from the 18th century onwards on the question of the emergence of Judaism and the composition of the Hebrew Bible. Finally, Adler introduces his method: a data-driven search for the terminus ante quem of Judaism—the date by which Judaism must have begun. He anchors his initial study in the first century CE—a time during which ample historical evidence exists for widespread observance of Torah laws—and works backwards in time until such evidence disappears. Adler organizes his study of Jewish practices by chapter.

=== Dietary laws (kashrut) ===
Adler finds abundant literary evidence of Jewish and Roman awareness of many Torah-based dietary restrictions—such as taboos against consuming pork, animal blood, and scaleless fish—in the first century CE. The archaeological record shows negligible remains of pig bones at first-century Judean sites, while contemporaneous non-Judean sites have considerable presence of pig bones. Similarly, almost all fish bones at Judean sites from this period belonged to fish with fins and scales. Additional literary evidence from the Dead Sea Scrolls, Roman authors, and biblical apocrypha suggests some observance of these rules in the first and second centuries BCE.

In contrast, Adler finds that texts before the second century BCE show "no indications that Judeans might have possessed any set of restrictions on their diet". Though the Bible does contain condemnations of the consumption of blood and pigs, Adler argues that—outside of the Pentateuch itself—condemnations of eating specific foods in Hebrew Bible texts that predate the middle of the second century BCE refer to their consumption by priests or as part of cultic practices, rather than everyday regulations for the general public. Iron Age Israelite assemblages contained low proportions of pig bones, though this was common of other Levantine cultures, aside from the Philistines. A substantial finding of catfish bones from the Persian period in the Givati Parking Lot dig site indicates consumption of non-kosher fish.

=== Ritual purity laws (tumah and taharah) ===
Adler finds first century CE literary evidence of Jewish adherence to ritual purity laws (tumah and taharah) in the works of Philo, Josephus, and in New Testament references to handwashing before meals. He also finds extensive archaeological evidence in the form of ritual immersion pools and chalk vessels—two features unique to Judean culture of the period that served to preserve Jews' ritual purity. The Dead Sea scrolls and (to a lesser extent) biblical apocrypha also note concern for ritual purity, showing its prominence in the 2nd–1st centuries BCE.

In reviewing pre-Hasmonean Hebrew biblical texts, Adler finds that most discussions of purity reference moral purity, rather than ritual purity, and that there does not appear to be a system for removing ritual impurities. He states that no stepped ritual immersion pools in Judea have been dated earlier than the late second century BCE, and that chalk vessels appear beginning in the first century BCE.

=== Prohibition of figural art ===
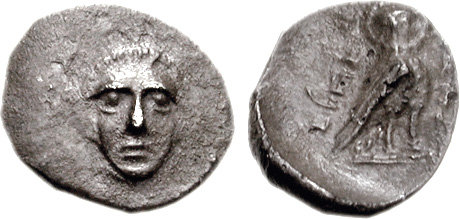
A coin of Persian-period governor Hezekiah, depicting the governor's face and a bird on each side, c. 350 BCE

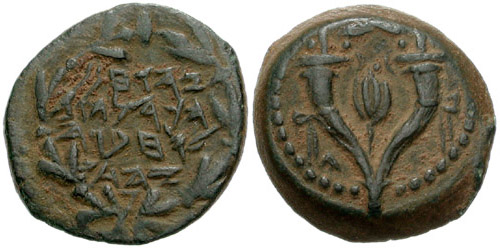
A coin of 2nd-century BCE Hasmonean ruler and High Priest of Israel, John Hyrcanus, omitting depictions of humans or animals

Deuteronomy 4 contains a prohibition on creating depictions of any living creature, which would violate the commandment against creating graven images. Adler finds that Philo and Josephus wrote of creating figural art as a taboo unto itself, often related to but distinct from idolatry (avodah zarah). Some first-century CE Greek and Roman writers appear to have known about a Jewish taboo against making statues. Herodian coins minted in Jerusalem omitted figural art, whereas some coins minted in the Roman city of Caesarea featured royal portraits. Architectural decorations, funerary art (such as on ossuaries), and pottery of the Hasmonean and Herodian periods in Judea also omit figural art almost completely.

Adler finds very limited evidence to evaluate in the early Hellenistic period. In the Persian period, however, Yehud coins routinely featured depictions of both humans and animals, including individuals with theophoric names. Stamp impressions on storage jars found in Judea, dating to either the sixth or fifth century BCE, bear depictions of lions. Persian-era human and animal figurines have been found in Judea, though less frequently than at contemporary sites elsewhere in the Levant. Fifth-century BCE seals from the Jewish community in Babylonia depict humans, animals, and mythical figures.

=== Tefillin and mezuzot ===
Adler finds first-century literary evidence for the use of tefillin and mezuzot "admittedly sparse and rather vague". Additionally, archaeological evidence for mezuzot is extremely limited. However, a small number of objects remarkably similar to modern tefillin were discovered during 20th-century excavations at Qumran, providing "incontrovertible evidence" of their use by early Roman times. Adler cites Józef Milik's work at Qumran to acknowledge that these tefillin could date as early as—but not earlier than—the Hasmonean era, based on the Hebrew script of the Torah verses contained in the tefillin. The Nash Papyrus, dating to the late second century BCE, may also have been used in tefillin.

Outside of the Torah, Adler finds no evidence in biblical texts that ancient Israelites or Judahites practiced rituals involving tefillin or mezuzot. Similarly, he finds no archaeological remains dating before the second century BCE "reasonably associated with tefillin or mezuzah practices". He cites the closest possible piece of evidence as being the Ketef Hinnom scrolls from c. 600 BCE, though the purpose of the scrolls is not known; nor is there evidence of widespread usage of such scrolls for ritual purposes.

=== Other Jewish practices ===
Adler uses this chapter to review six additional Jewish practices, including: circumcision, observance of Shabbat, Passover traditions, fasting on Yom Kippur, rituals related to Sukkot, and having a seven-branch menorah in the Jerusalem temple. Adler finds that circumcision was probably practiced traditionally by Israelites, but that it is only recorded as a matter of law starting in the second century BCE. Sabbath prohibitions were widely followed in Hasmonean, Herodian, and Roman times, though the precise contours of these prohibitions were a matter of substantial legal debate. Passover was widely celebrated as a seven-day feast of unleavened bread in the first century CE; this may have combined two separate occasions in antiquity—a festival of unleavened bread and a sacrificial Passover offering. Adler finds first-centuries CE and BCE evidence of Yom Kippur observance, but apparent ignorance of this observance in Persian-era biblical texts. Specific Sukkot rituals, such as the four species, were "extremely well known" in the first century but spoken of only once in the bible outside the Torah. The earliest depiction of a seven-branch menorah dates to the first century BCE.

Adler concludes this review by noting, "All these elements of first-century-CE Judaism are attested in the first century BCE, and some also in the second century BCE, but none are clearly attested prior to this."

=== Emergence of the synagogue ===
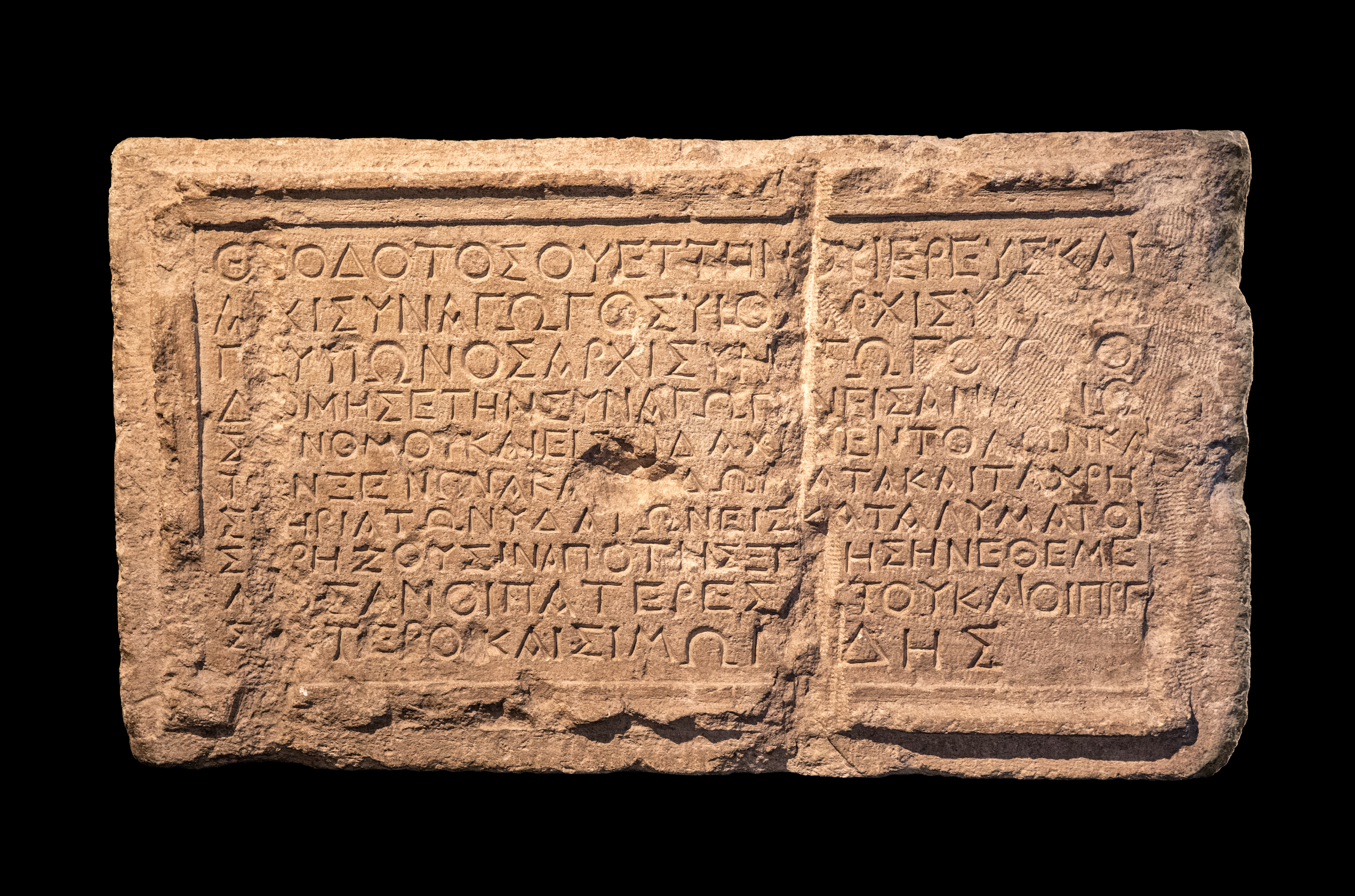
The Theodotos inscription (c. 1st century CE) identifies the synagogue as an institution devoted to teaching Torah.

Unlike the previous chapters devoted to covering specific laws, this chapter concerns the emergence of the synagogue, an institution used primarily in ancient times to teach Torah law observances to ordinary Judeans—"without which Judaism itself may never have taken root and spread". Adler finds from numerous literary sources that first-century Judeans used to gather weekly at the synagogue for recitations of the Torah followed by verbal explanations and commentary. Archaeological finds like the Theodotos inscription and the synagogue ruins at Masada affirm their existence in the first century. Contrastingly, there is no evidence in the Bible or apocrypha for a synagogue-like institution. Some inscriptions for "houses of prayer" date from the late third to first centuries BCE both inside and outside of Judea, but it is unknown what specific rituals Judeans performed there (such as Torah reading). The synagogue at Umm el-Umdan appears to be the only synagogue found dating to the Hasmonean period, with none predating it.

=== Conclusion ===
In the concluding chapter, Adler reviews the prior evidence to assess the most likely time period for widespread adoption of Torah law. He reviews the probability for three time periods:

- Persian period (539–332 BCE). Adler finds the historicity of Torah-related narratives in Ezra–Nehemiah to be dubious and probably ideological constructions of later writers. He also argues that few scholars subscribe to the theory of "Persian imperial authorization" that argued the Cyrus edict formed the basis of formal adoption of the Torah as law in Judea. Adler acknowledges that archaeological evidence substantiates Yahwistic practice in Judea and in the diaspora (such as in Babylonia and Elephantine) during the period, but not Torah-based Judaism. Thus he concludes there is "little reason" to believe that Torah-based Jewish practice was adopted in the Persian period.
- Early Hellenistic period (332–167 BCE). There is ambiguous literary evidence in the 3rd century BCE that the Torah was considered Jewish law, and it is around this time that the Torah was translated into Greek for the first time. The late-3rd century BCE writer Demetrius the Chronographer showed familiarity with patriarchal narratives from the Torah, but surviving texts do not mention Mosaic law. Ben Sira's Book of Sirach extolls the Torah's commandments as a whole but elaborates little on any specific laws. Greek intellectual innovations—such as the creation of binding legislative codes for ordinary individuals (rather than divine or royal legal proclamations, like the Code of Hammurabi)—may have created the proper conditions for the adoption of Torah as binding law at this time. Adler concludes that the proposition of mass adoption of Torah law in this period "lack[s] any direct evidence" but "presents some intriguing possibilities".
- Late Hellenistic (Hasmonean) period (167–63 BCE). Adler suggests that literary evidence from the Book of Daniel and biblical apocrypha about Antiochus's abolition of an already-established system of Torah law is "political propaganda meant to legitimate the Hasmonean regime". Adler cites scholarship that has proposed that the Hasmoneans aggressively promoted Torah Judaism as a unifying ideology against external forces, like Hellenism. Literary evidence suggests the Hasmoneans imposed Torah law on conquered subjects—such as the Idumeans, Samaritans, and Itureans—as their kingdom expanded. Additional support for the Hasmonean period is lent by the contemporary rise of sectarianism within Judaism, with competing factions such as the Sadducees, Pharisees, and Essenes offering competing interpretations of Torah practice at this time.

Adler concludes that, compared with the Persian and early Hellenistic periods, the Hasmonean period is "a far more conducive epoch in which to seek the origins of Judaism".

== Reception ==
Though The Origins of Judaism received praise for its methodological clarity and rigor, its conclusions divided scholars of ancient Judaism. In a starred review, Publishers Weekly called the book a "bravura study" and praised "Adler's facility with a wide range of historical evidence". Archaeologist Israel Finkelstein agreed with Adler's hypothesis of Hasmonean origin for widespread adoption of halakha, saying: "Judaism, as we understand today—Jewish law—comes, in my opinion ... from the time of the Hasmoneans in the second century BC."

Professor Malka Simkovich of the Catholic Theological Union published a review in the Jewish Review of Books arguing that Adler paid insufficient attention to literary evidence in the Persian and Hellenistic periods suggesting common Jewish practice and regard for the Torah. Simkovich also contended that Adler's approach of starting his studies in the first century CE and working backwards created a bias toward viewing Judaism through a lens of later practices, rather than earlier versions of Jewish practice. Adler responded to Simkovich's critique, arguing that he intentionally placed priority on archaeological evidence as "a corrective to the general tendency within scholarship on Second Temple period Judaism to privilege the study of ideas ... over concrete practices found among the ancient Jewish masses."

Professor Chad Spigel of Trinity University published a review for the Jewish Book Council critiquing Adler's Torah-centered definition of Judaism, "to the exclusion of cultural and ethnic components of Judaism", as too narrow. However, Spigel applauded the book's examination of early evidence for adoption of specific Torah laws.

Professor Benjamin Gordon of the University of Pittsburgh reviewed the book in AJS Review, calling the book "essential reading for scholars of Second Temple Judaism", but cautioning that Adler's conclusions about Jewish life in pre-Hasmonean periods "may simply reflect the limitations of our source material".

== See also ==
- Halakha – Jewish law derived from the Torah
- Hasmonean Judea
- history of the Jews and Judaism in the Land of Israel
- Oral Torah
- Who is a Jew?
- Yahwism – ancient Israelite religion from which Judaism evolved
