= Hasmonean coinage =

Coins minted by the Hasmonean kings

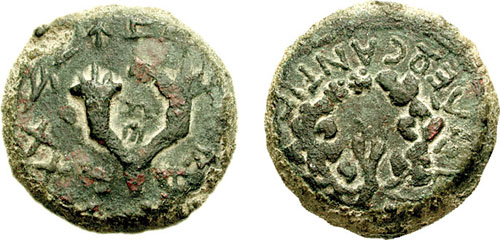
Coin of Antigonus (40–37 BCE)

Hasmonean coinage refers to the coins minted by the Hasmonean kings. Only bronze coins in various denominations have been found; the smallest being a prutah or a half prutah.

One Roman silver denarius is associated with the Hasmoneans, bearing a supplicant man bowing before a camel with a palm branch in his hand and the inscription BACCHIVS IVDAEVS (Bacchius the Jew). The individual on the coin has often been identified as Aristobulus II.

Unlike the coins of surrounding Hellenistic states, Hasmonean coins do not bear the images of a rulers or deities, in accordance with the commandment "Thou shalt not make unto thee any graven image." The Hebrew inscriptions found on Hasmonean coins are:

- "Yehochanan Kohen Gadol Chever Hayehudim" (Yehochanan the High Priest, Council of the Jews).
- "Yehochanan Kohen Gadol Rosh Chever Hayehudim" (Yehochanan the High Priest, Head of the Council of the Jews).
- "Yehonatan Kohen Gadol Chever Hayehudim" (Yehonatan the High Priest, Council of the Jews).
- "Yehonatan Hamelech" (Yehonatan the King).
- "Yehudah Kohen Gadol Chever Hayehudim" (Yehudah the High Priest, Council of the Jews).
- "Malka Aleksandros" (King Alexander)
- "Matityahu Kohen Gadol Chever Hayehudim" (Matityahu the High Priest, Council of the Jews).
- "Matityahu HaKohen" (Matityahu the High Priest).
- "Mattityah"

== The Hasmonean dynasty and era (164–37 BCE) ==
The era of Hasmonean rule lasted for 127 years. It was founded by High Priest Simon son of Matityahu, and consolidated by his son Yochanan surnamed Hyrcanus. Thereafter followed Yehuda Aristobolus, Salome Alexandra, Alexander Yannai and then feuding brothers Hyrcanus II and Aristobulus. Hyrcanus and Aristoblulus each asked the Roman Republic to intervene on their behalf; as a result Judea fell under the greater rule of Rome as an autonomous province but still with a significant amount of autonomy. The last Hasmonean king was Aristobulus's son Matityahu Antigonus.

In 138 BCE, the Seleucid King Antiochus VII Sidetes published a royal decree, granting Simon Maccabaeus the right to mint his own coinage.

== John Hyrcanus ==
John Hyrcanus (in Hebrew Yochanan Hyrcanus; reigned 134–104 BCE, until his death). Minted prutot that said:

- Yehochanan the High Priest and council of the Jews (Sanhedrin)
- Yehochanan the High Priest and the Head of council of the Jews
- Yehochanan the High Priest and the [council of the] Jews
- 'A' (may have stood for Antiochus VII) Yehochanan the High Priest and council of the Jews.

He also had monograms on some prutot on the cornucopia side, just left of the cornucopia, some resembling Ά, Π or Λ.

The Jerusalem-minted bronze prutah had on the reverse a double cornucopia adorned with ribbons with a pomegranate between horns, with borders of dots.

== Alexander Jannaeus ==
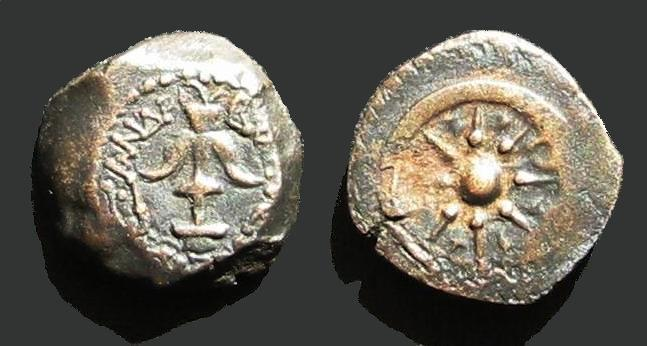
Coin of Alexander Jannaeus (103–76 BCE). Obv: Seleucid anchor and Greek Legend: BASILEOS ALEXANDROU "King Alexander". Rev: Eight-spoke wheel or starburst within diadem. Hebrew legend inside the spokes: "Yehonatan Hamelech" (Yehonatan the King).

Alexander Jannaeus (also known as Alexander Jannai/Yannai), king of Judea from (103 to 76 BCE), son of John Hyrcanus, inherited the throne from his brother Aristobulus, and married his brother's widow, Shlomtzion or "Shelomit".

The Jannaeus coins are the most typical Jewish coins found at archaeological sites in the former lands of the Hasmonean kingdom. They represent over 87% of the coins discovered in Jerusalem and 39% of the Hasmonean, Herodian, and Byzantine coins found in the southern Levant. Gamla was the site of the largest-ever discovery of Jannaeus coins from a single location.

== Antigonus II Mattathias ==
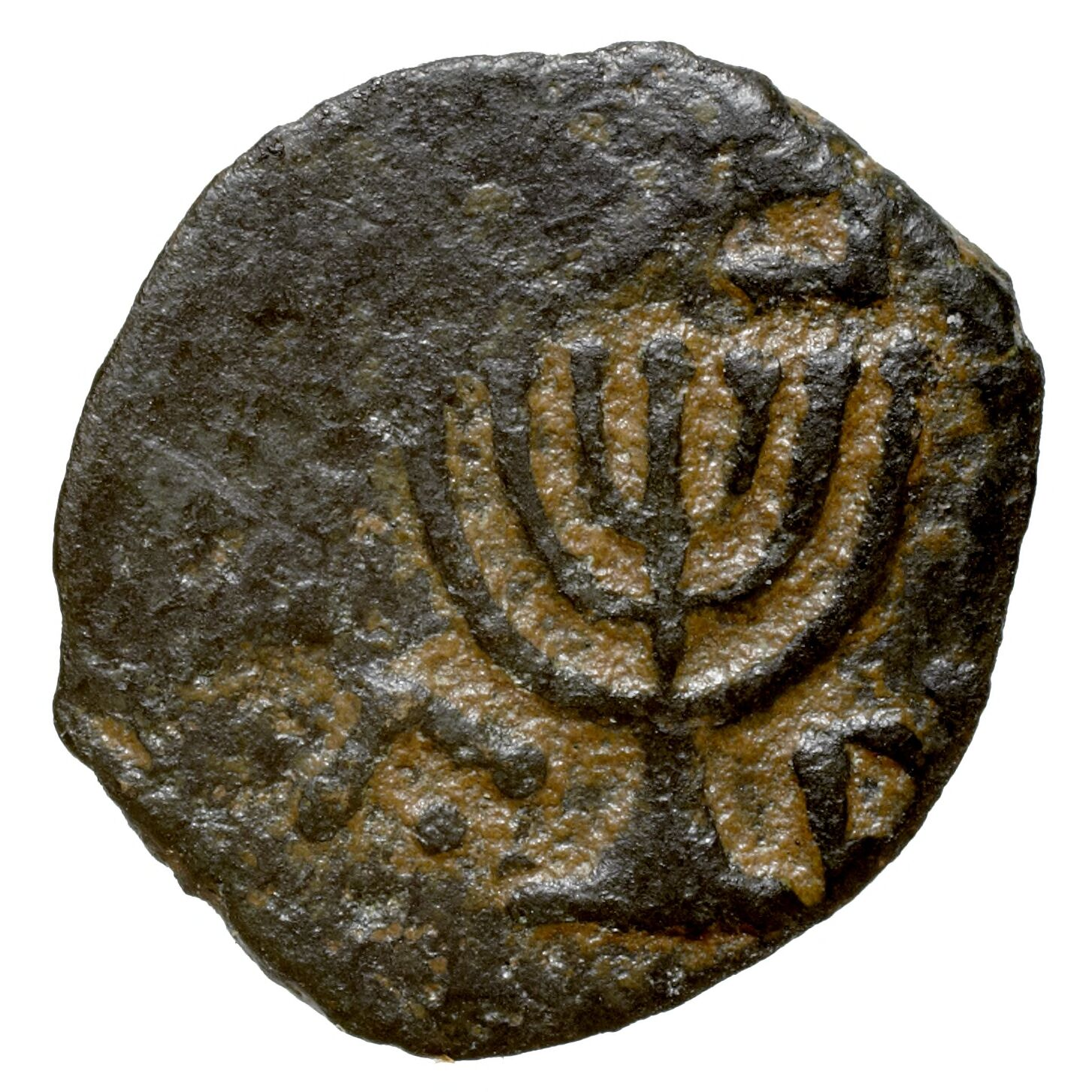
Coin of Antigonus II Mattathias, depicting the Temple menorah

Antigonus II Mattathias, also known as Antigonus the Hasmonean, was the son of King Aristobulus II of Judea.

Obv: Menorah with Greek inscription "BASILEWS ANTIGONOY" (King Antigonus).
Rev: Showbread Table (Shulchan) with Hebrew inscription "Matityahu HaKohen" (Matityahu the High Priest).

Obv: Double cornucopia with ancient Hebrew script; reading "Matityahu Kohen Gadol Chever Hayehudim" (Matityahu the High Priest, Council of the Jews).
Rev: Greek inscription; reading "BASILEWS ANTIGONOY" (King Antignus).

== See also ==
=== Judaean coinage ===
- Yehud coinage
- Herodian coinage
- Procuratorial coinage of Roman Judaea
- First Jewish Revolt coinage
- Judaea Capta coinage
- Bar Kokhba Revolt coinage

=== Historical currencies in Judaea ===
- Ma'ah, Aramaic for gerah, ancient Hebrew unit of weight and currency
- Prutah
- Shekel, ancient Near Eastern unit of weight and coin
- Zuz, ancient Jewish name for certain silver coinage

=== Other ===
- List of historical currencies
- List of inscriptions in biblical archaeology
- Maccabees
- Maccabean Revolt
- Hasmonean
- Judah Maccabeus
- Jonathan Maccabaeus
- Simon Maccabeus
- Mattathias
- Alexander Jannaeus
- John Hyrcanus
- Aristobulus
- Salome Alexandra
- Hyrcanus II
- Aristobulus II
