= Yehud coinage =

Local coinage of the Persian province of Yehud

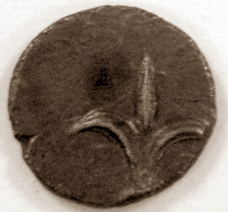
Reverse of a Yehud coin from the Persian era, with lily (symbol of Jerusalem)

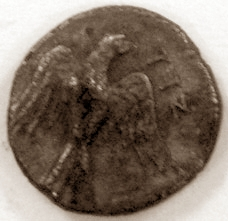
Obverse of a Judean silver Yehud coin from the Persian era (0.58 gram), with falcon or eagle and Aramaic inscription YHD (Judea). Denomination is a Ma'ah.

The Yehud coinage is a series of small silver coins bearing the Aramaic inscription Yehud. They derive their name from the inscription "YHD" (𐤉𐤄𐤃), "Yehud", the Aramaic name of the Achaemenid Persian province in the Levant which had formerly been the Kingdom of Judah. Other coins are inscribed "YHDH", the Hebrew name for Persian province. The minting of Yehud coins began c. 350 BC and continued until the end of the Ptolemaic period in 30 BC.

== Date and origin ==
In 2023, numismatic scholars Gitler, Lorber, and Fontanille have published an updated classification and chronology of the Yehud coinage. It is now seen as comprising 44 types of coins. The series began with a small number of drachms with Aramaic legends, classified as Types 1–3, which were produced at a mint at some location in Philistia. The scholars believe that this mint was executing a commission from the provincial administration of Judah.

It is only with the next issue of coins, Type 4 (the Series with Athena), that the minting began in Judah. These coins feature a Paleo-Hebrew legend, as opposed to the earlier issues with an Aramaic legend.

These conclusions were reached based on the comparison of Yehud coins with the earlier coins of Philistia, but especially with the coins of Samaria, which were much more numerous and earlier than those of Judea.

This opening of a mint in Judah seems to have been marked by the beginning of the production of much smaller coins, that are rather unusual in the general regional context of the Eastern Mediterranean. After this, the production of these fractional coins by the Yehud mint continued for a considerable period of time. The scholars believe that perhaps these smaller coins were more suitable for the generally agrarian economy of this province. But it is also possible that they were somehow associated with the Temple of Jerusalem, and the need for the smaller coin denominations as Temple payments.

Seventeen types of Yehud coins were published in the Achaemenid Persian context. After the Macedonian conquest of Alexander the Great, the minting of these coins continued with the Type 18 coins.

The Macedonian period Yehud coins comprise the Types 18 to 32. They feature many coins portraying animals such as lynx, owl and duck. They also carry images of mythological winged bull and winged horse.

The Ptolemaic coins minted in Judea are Types 33 to 44. They carry only the Yehud legend, and no Greek lettering. The minting of Yehud coins stopped after the Ptolemaic period. The next coin series was minted at the time of John Hyrcanus I with different legends.

== Notable coins ==
=== Hezekiah coins ===
The Yehud coins of Hezekiah (governor), and a single coin of Johanan (High Priest) have attracted considerable attention. In regards to Hezekiah/Yehizqiyah, there are many such coins of several types with and without the title 'governor'. The more recent research indicates that, on the earlier coins, only the name of Hezekiah/Yehizqiyah is given. But then the title was added.

=== God on the Winged Wheel coin ===
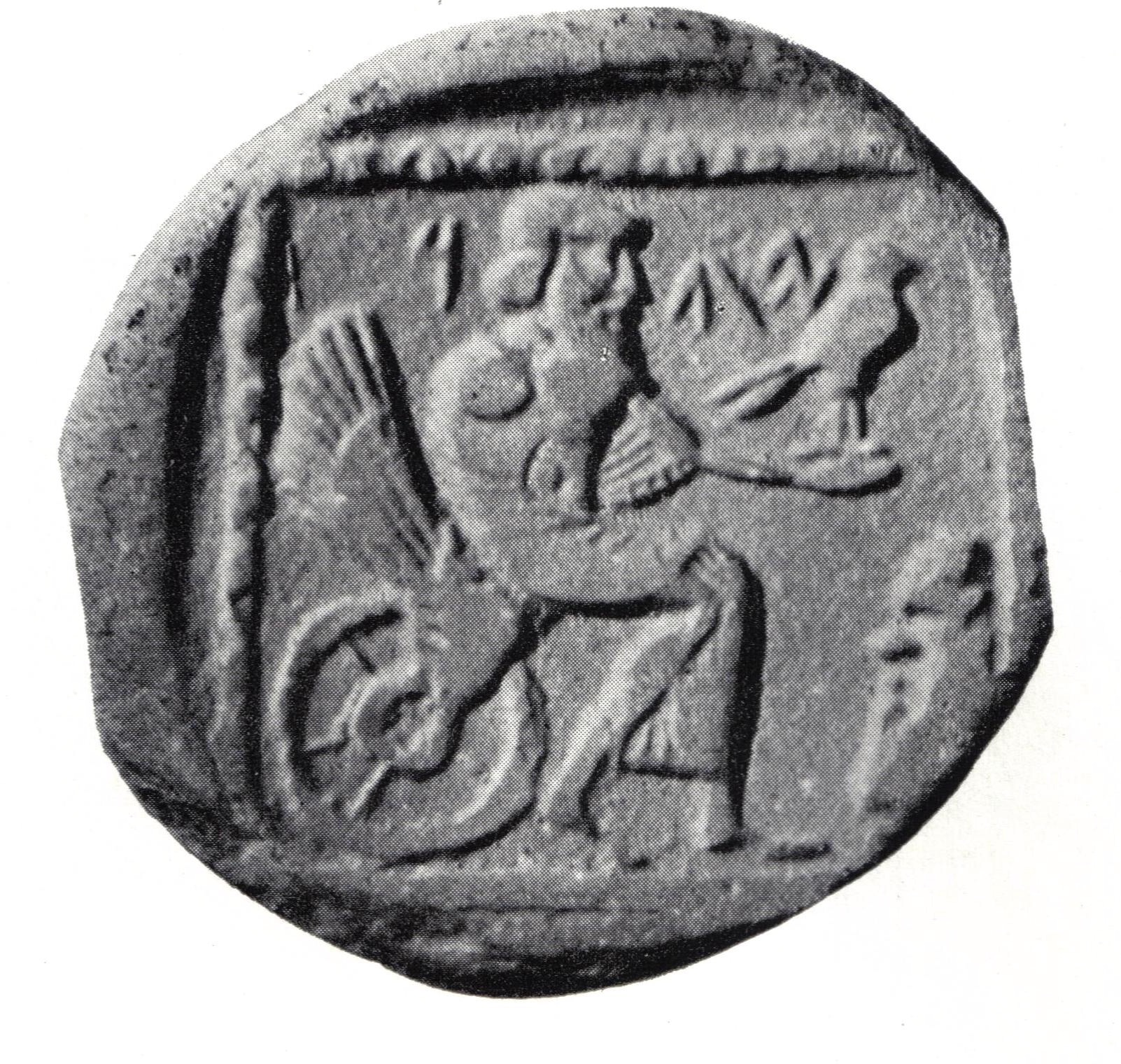
The God on the Winged Wheel coin, known since 1814, originally from Gaza, likely during the Achaemenid Empire in the 4th century BCE. The coin shows a deity seated on a winged wheel, often interpreted as a depiction of Yahweh.

The famous God on the Winged Wheel coin, also referred to as the ‘British Museum drachm’, first published in 1814, had been much commented upon by the biblical and other scholars, and it is sometimes described as the earliest coin minted in the region. The coin presents an image of a divinity seated on a winged wheel that was often interpreted as a representation of Yahweh. The legend on the coin is somewhat unclear; it is interpreted as either "YHW" (Yahu) or "YHD" (Judea). It has been classified as Type 2 Yehud coin.

The obverse of this coin also features the portrait of a man in a military helmet that many interpreted as Bagoas, a general of Artaxerxes III.

According to a detailed study by Shenkar (2008), an attribution of this coin to a Samarian mint is plausible, based on its "weight, chemical composition and iconography". So it could be a "unique attempt to depict a Samarian Yahweh". Only one such coin is known, and it may have been designed to combine "the most powerful and widely known images of deities – Zeus and Ahuramazda to produce something eclectic and new."

=== Other silver coins ===
Other silver coins were found in Khirbet Almit and near Jerusalem, archaeologists found a broken silver coin that originating in the 6th century BCE.

Robert Kool, a coin expert at the Israel Antiquities Authority said, "The coin is extremely rare, joining half a dozen coins of its type that have been found in archaeological excavations in the country. The coins were minted in a period when the use of coins had just begun."

== Earlier research ==
In the past, Mildenburg dated Yehud coins from the early 4th century BCE to the reign of Ptolemy I (312–285 BCE), while Meshorer believed there was a gap during Ptolemy I's time and that minting resumed during Ptolemy II and continued into Ptolemy III, although this has been questioned.

The YHD coins were generally believed to date from the Persian period, but some of the YHDH coins were also seen as being from the following Ptolemaic period.

The earlier coins were believed to have been produced in imitation of Athenian coins. But the more recent research has stressed the importance of the influence from the Phoenician and Samaritan area. Ultimately the numismatic trends were nevertheless traced to the area of Tarsos and Cilicia (satrapy) in the coastal Asia Minor, which was the economically flourishing cosmopolitan area at the time, after the conquest of Cyrus the Great.

Yehud coins were used locally as a small change to facilitate local economy. Nevertheless, the larger denomination coins from more centralized mints elsewhere in the region were also circulating in large numbers, especially in the context of foreign trade.

== The use of figural art ==
Unlike later Jewish coinage, Yehud coins depict living creatures, flowers and even human beings.

During the First Temple period, figural art was frequently used, centralized cherubim over the Ark of the Covenant, the twelve oxen that supported the giant laver in front of Solomon's Temple, etc. Thus, it is likely that the Yehud coins are continuing the use of figural art from the previous period. The traditional religious prohibition against graven images was possibly seen as relating only to idolatrous images rather than the purely decorative; alternatively, these prohibitions had not yet seen widespread adoption among Judeans.

Depictions on the coinage include imagery borrowed from other cultures, such as the Athenian Owl, and various mythological creatures. The lily flower was also commonly portrayed.

Various human images are also portrayed. Some coins bear images of Persian rulers. The identity of other human images are not always clear; some of them may even be images of Jewish leaders, such as Temple priests.

== Coin features and chronology ==
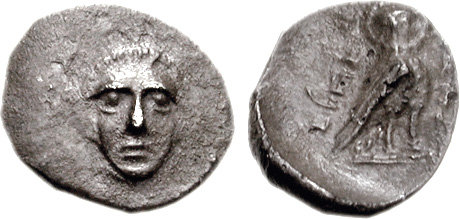
An example of the Hezekiah (governor) coin, ca. 350 BCE. The image of Hezekiah with the Persian title 'governor' or 'satrap'. The Hebrew inscription is YḤZQKYH HPḤH: Yehezkiya (Yehizqiyah) the peha

The coins from the Persian period tend to be inscribed in Aramaic "square script" or Paleo-Hebrew and use the Aramaic spelling of the province as 'y-h-d', while those coins from the Ptolemaic/Hellenistic period (or maybe earlier) are inscribed in the Paleo-Hebrew script and usually spell Judea as 'y-h-d', 'y-h-d-h' or 'y-h-w-d-h'.

A 2009 study by Yehoshua Zlotnik attempts to relate different kinds of coins, and the specifics of their manufacture to the changing political situation in Judea in the 4th century BCE. He deals with different coin-types, and with such unusual phenomena as minting on only one side of the coin, and seemingly deliberate flaws on certain dies. According to Zlotnik, these and other features can clarify the political state of affairs in Judah, such as independence, autonomy, or transition period. However, Zlotnik's comparisons of Yehud coins with contemporary coins from various neighbouring mints, such as Samaria, Edom and Sidon are quite limited, and do not consider the influence from the Achaemenid empire.

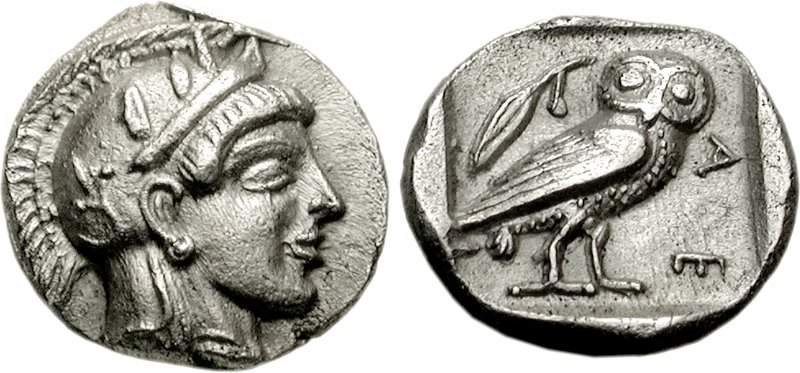
Athenian silver obol ca. 450 BC – the type of coin widely imitated in Judea and Egypt around 400 BCE. Helmeted head of Athena right / Owl standing right. In Judea, the olive sprig of the Athenian coin was replaced by the lily, and instead of the Greek "AΘE" (Athens) the Hebrew letters 'y-h-d' were used (examples)

According to Zlotnik, the first minting of “Yehud” coins began under the influence of the contemporary Egyptian revolts against Persia. However this link with the revolts has not been clarified. Before the Ptolemaic dynasty introduced standard coinage to Egypt, pre-existing native dynasties made only very limited use of coins. Egyptian gold stater was the first coin ever minted in ancient Egypt around 360 BC during the reign of pharaoh Teos of the 30th Dynasty. But these were gold coins that were mostly used to pay salaries of Greek mercenaries in his service. The small silver coins (obols) of Yehud type were not common in Egypt at that time.

The Persian reconquered the area after 360 BCE, so this is the likely beginning of the Yehud mintage. This type of minting continued also under the Ptolemies.

Mildenberg divided most of the Persian period 'Yehud' coinage into three groups: an early group of poorly defined coins with the head of Athena on the obverse with her owl on the reverse with the inscription 'y-h-d' in Paleo-Hebrew; the second group are more clearly defined and depict a lily, and an Egyptian falcon (see pictures), and the head of the Persian king, with the inscription 'y-h-d'; the third group has the Hebrew inscription 'Hezekiah the governor' (yḥzqyh hpḥh). Yet the more recent research indicates that on the earlier coins, only the name of Hezekiah/Yehizqiyah is given without the title.

Almost all of these coins have been found in the area of Judea.

The minting of Yehud coins stopped after the Ptolemaic period.

== Coin metrology ==
In older research, the Yehud coins were seen to come in two denominations, approximately .58 gram as a ma'ah and approximately .29 gram as a half ma'ah (chatzi ma'ah).

More recently, Y. Ronen conducted a groundbreaking metrological study of Yehud coins.

"He calculated the average (modal) weights of five different varieties of Yehud coins and found that some conform to the gerah and half gerah of the Persic weight standard (divisions of the shekel or Persic stater of c. 11.4 g, weighing 0.48 g and 0.255 g, respectively), while others conform to the hemiobol and quarter obol of the Attic weight standard (0.315 g and 0.195 g, respectively)."

For the larger transactions, many bigger coins were used at the time, such as the Philistian and Phoenician coins that were mostly influenced by the Athenian drachma and the tetradrachm. Also the Persian coinage, the Persian daric and the Sigloi were used, and later the Ptolemaic coinage. As the evidence from the discovered coin hoards has shown, in these hoards, the Yehud coins usually were only a very small part of the hoard.

== Heritage ==
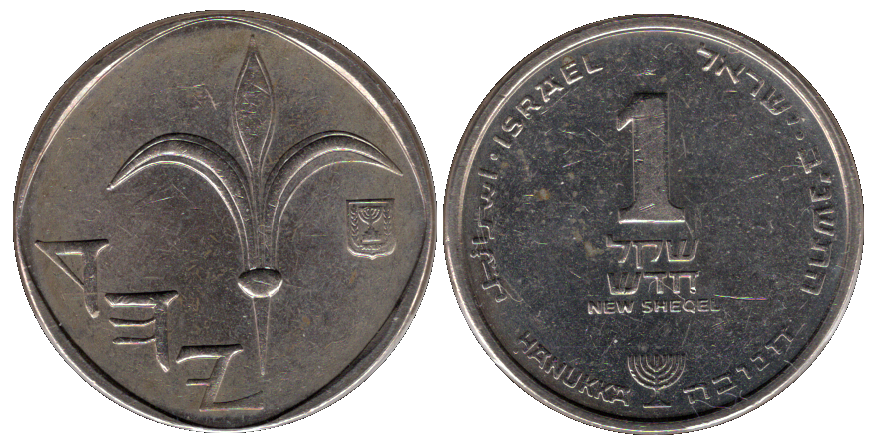
A one new Israeli Shekel coin, with a lily and a YHD legend on the obverse

The lily symbol with the legend 𐤉𐤄𐤃 (YHD) appears on the obverse of the one Israeli new shekel coin (שקל חדש אחד).

== See also ==
- Iudaea Province, the Roman province of Judaea (6–135 CE)
- Yehud Medinata ("Province of Judah"), Persian province (6th–4th c. BCE)
- Coins in Judah/Judaea
  - Ma'ah, Aramaic for gerah, ancient Hebrew unit of weight and currency
  - Prutah
  - Shekel, ancient Near Eastern unit of weight and coin
  - Zuz, ancient Jewish name for certain silver coinage
- Judaean and Judaea-related coinage
  - Hasmonean coinage
  - Herodian coinage
  - Procuratorial coinage of Roman Judaea
  - First Jewish Revolt coinage
  - Judaea Capta coinage
  - Bar Kokhba Revolt coinage
