= Origins of Judaism =

Overview of the early history of Judaism

Judaism
- יַהֲדוּת; Yahadut
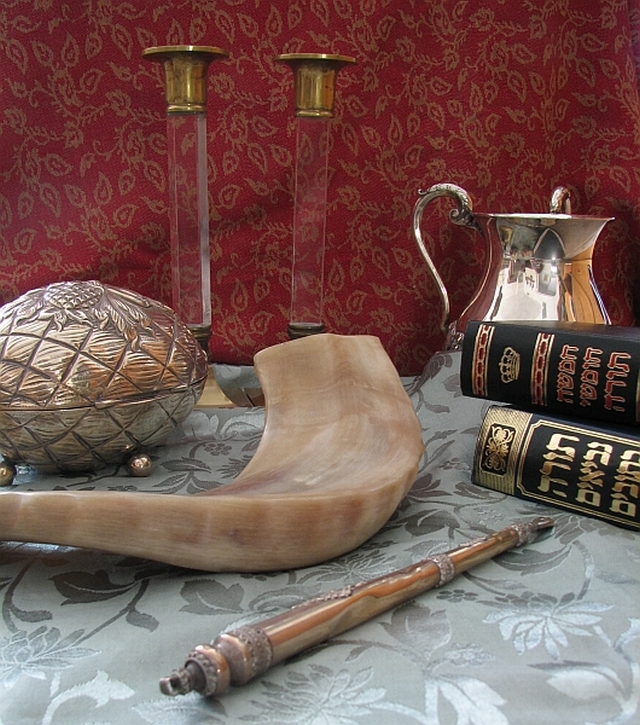
- Judaica (clockwise from top): Shabbat candlesticks, handwashing cup, Chumash and Tanakh, Torah pointer, shofar and etrog box
- Type: Ethnic religion
- Classification: Abrahamic
- Scripture: Hebrew Bible
- Theology: Monotheistic
- Leaders: Jewish leadership
- Movements: Jewish religious movements
- Associations: Jewish religious organizations
- Region: Predominant religion in Israel and widespread worldwide as minorities
- Language: Biblical Hebrew
- Headquarters: Jerusalem (Zion)
- Founder: Abraham (traditional)
- Origin: 1st millennium BCE; 20th–18th century BCE (traditional); Judah; Mesopotamia (traditional)
- Separated from: Yahwism
- Congregations: Jewish religious communities
- Members: c. 15 million
- Ministers: Rabbis

The widespread belief among archeological and historical scholars is that the origins of Judaism lie in the Achaemenid province of Yehud. Judaism evolved from the ancient Israelite religion, developing new conceptions of the priesthood, a focus on Written Law and scripture and the prohibition of intermarriage with non-Jews.

During the Iron Age I period (12th to 11th centuries BCE), the religion of the Israelites branched out of the Canaanite religion and took the form of Yahwism. Yahwism was the national religion of the Kingdom of Israel and of the Kingdom of Judah. According to Mark S. Smith, the religion was distinct from other Canaanite religious traditions, Yahwism was monolatristic and focused on the particular worship of Yahweh, whom his worshippers conflated with El. Yahwists appeared to start denying the existence of other gods, whether Canaanite or foreign, as Yahwism became more strictly monotheistic over time.

During the Babylonian captivity of the 6th and 5th centuries BCE (Iron Age II), certain circles within exiled Judeans in Babylon refined pre-existing ideas about Yahwism, such as the nature of divine election, law and covenants. Their ideas came to dominate the Jewish community in the following centuries.

From the 5th century BCE until 70 CE, Yahwism evolved into the various theological schools of Second Temple Judaism, besides Hellenistic Judaism in the diaspora. The text of the Hebrew Bible was redacted into its extant form in this period and possibly formally canonized, as well. Textual evidence pointing to widespread observance of the Mosaic law among ordinary Jews first appears in the writings of Hecataeus of Abdera around 300 BCE, during the early Hellenistic period.

Rabbinic Judaism developed in late antiquity, during the 3rd to 6th centuries CE; the Masoretic Text of the Hebrew Bible and the Talmud were compiled in this period. The oldest manuscripts of the Masoretic tradition come from the 10th and 11th centuries CE, in the form of the Aleppo Codex (of the later portions of the 10th century CE) and of the Leningrad Codex (dated to 1008–1009 CE). Due largely to censoring and the burning of manuscripts in medieval Europe, the oldest existing manuscripts of various rabbinic works are quite late. The oldest surviving complete manuscript copy of the Babylonian Talmud dates from 1342 CE.

== Iron Age Yahwism ==
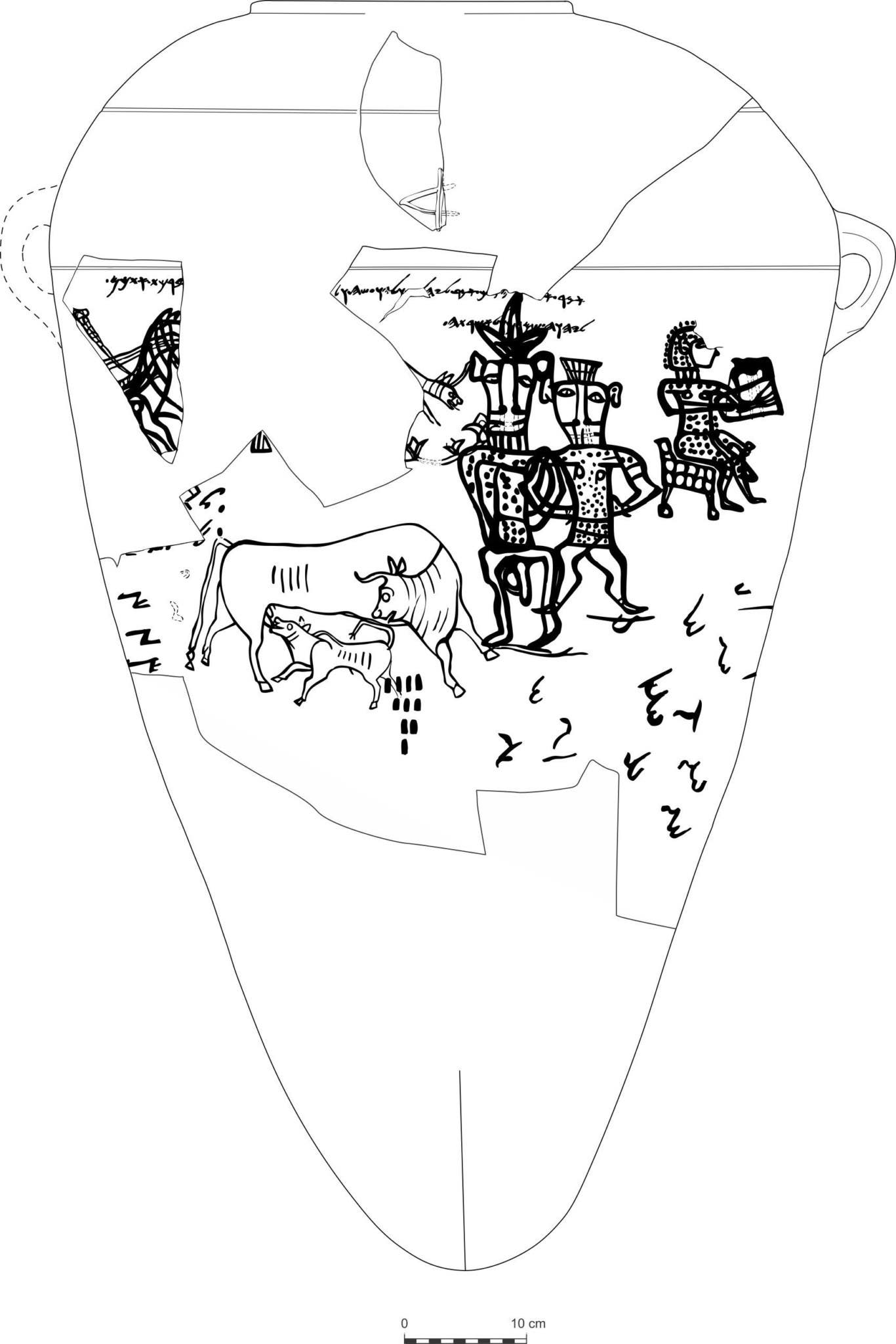
Image on a pithos sherd found at Kuntillet Ajrud with the inscription "Yahweh and his Asherah"

Judaism has three essential and related elements: the study of the Torah; the recognition of Israel as God's chosen people and the recipients of God's law at Mount Sinai; and the requirement that Israel and their descendants live according to the laws outlined in the Torah. These three elements have their origins in Iron Age Yahwism, and, later Second Temple Judaism.

Iron Age Yahwism was formalized in the 9th century BCE, around the same time that the Iron Age kingdoms of Israel (or Samaria) and Judah became consolidated in Canaan. Yahweh was the national god of both kingdoms.

Other neighbouring Canaanite kingdoms also each had their own national god originating from the Canaanite pantheon of gods: Chemosh was the god of Moab, Milcom was the god of the Ammonites, Qaus was the god of the Edomites, and so on. In each kingdom, the king was his national god's viceroy on Earth.

The national gods in Canaan were relatively equal, mirroring the balance of the kingdoms. Each kingdom featured a divine couple—Yahweh and the goddess Asherah in Israel and Judah—who led a pantheon of lesser gods.

By the late 8th century BCE, both Judah and Israel had become vassals of the Assyrian Empire, bound by treaties of loyalty on one side and protection on the other. The Northern Kingdom rebelled and was destroyed c. 722 BCE; refugees from the former kingdom fled to Judah, bringing with them the tradition that Yahweh, already known in Judah, was not merely the most important of the gods, but the only god who should be served. Some scholars date the start of widespread monotheism to around this time, and view it as a response to Neo-Assyrian aggression.

Various prophets traditionally played significant roles in promoting Yahwism at the expense of its rival religions, both in the North and South. The Yahwist-centred outlook was taken up by the Judahite landowning elite, who became extremely powerful in court circles in the next century when they placed the eight-year-old Josiah (r. 641–609 BCE) on the throne. During Josiah's reign, Assyrian power suddenly collapsed (after 631 BCE), and a pro-independence movement took power in Jerusalem, promoting both the independence of Judah from foreign overlords and loyalty to Yahweh as the sole god of Israel. With Josiah's support, the "Yahweh-alone" movement launched a full-scale reform of worship, including a covenant (i.e., treaty) between Judah and Yahweh, replacing that between Judah and Assyria.

By the time this occurred, Yahweh had already been absorbing or superseding the positive characteristics of the other gods and goddesses of the pantheon, a process of appropriation that was an essential step in the subsequent emergence of one of Judaism's most notable features: its uncompromising monotheism. Philip R. Davies argues that the people of ancient Israel and Judah did not adhere to Judaism as it is understood now. Instead, they practiced polytheistic worship involving multiple gods, focusing on fertility, local shrines, and regional legends. They likely did not possess a written Torah, specific laws governing ritual purity, or a sense of a covenant with a singular national deity.

== Second Temple Judaism ==
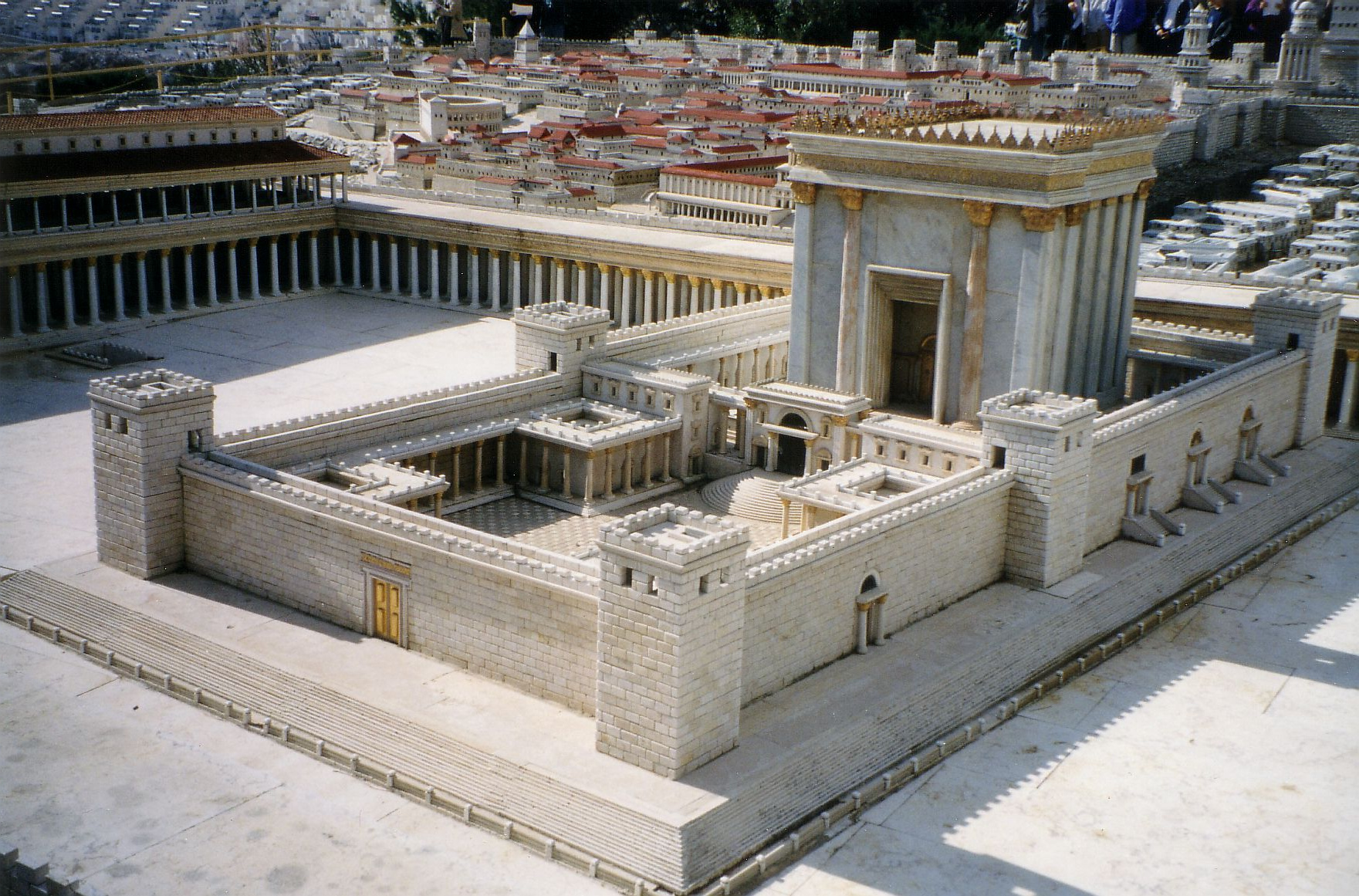
Model of the Second Temple showing the courtyards and the Sanctuary, as described in Middot

In 586 BCE, Jerusalem was destroyed by the Babylonians, and the Judean elite – the royal family, the priests, the scribes, and other members of the elite – were taken to Babylon in captivity. They represented only a minority of the population, and Judah, after recovering from the immediate impact of war, continued to have a life not much different from what had gone before. In 539 BCE, Babylon fell to the Persians; the Babylonian exile ended and a number of the exiles, but by no means all and probably a minority, returned to Jerusalem. They were the descendants of the original exiles, and had never lived in Judah; nevertheless, in the view of the authors of the Biblical literature, they, and not those who had remained in the land, were "Israel". Judah, now called Yehud, was a Persian province, and the returnees, with their Persian connections in Babylon, were in control of it. They represented also the descendants of the old "Yahweh-alone" movement, but the religion they instituted was significantly different from both monarchic Yahwism and modern Judaism. These differences include new concepts of priesthood, a new focus on written law and thus on scripture, and a concern with preserving purity by prohibiting intermarriage outside the community of this new "Israel".

The Yahweh-alone party returned to Jerusalem after the Persian conquest of Babylon and became the ruling elite of Yehud. Much of the Hebrew Bible was assembled, revised and edited by them in the 5th century BCE, including the Torah (the books of Genesis, Exodus, Leviticus, Numbers, and Deuteronomy), the historical works, and much of the prophetic and Wisdom literature. The Bible narrates the discovery of a legal book in the Temple in the seventh century BCE, which the majority of scholars see as some form of Deuteronomy and regard as pivotal to the development of the scripture. The growing collection of scriptures was translated into Greek in the Hellenistic period by the Jews of the Egyptian diaspora, while the Babylonian Jews produced the court tales of the Book of Daniel (chapters 1–6 of Daniel – chapters 7–12 were a later addition), and the books of Tobit and Esther.

Afterwards, Yahwism split into Second Temple Judaism and Samaritanism. These religions initially had friendly relations but after John Hyrcanus's destruction of the Mount Gerizim temple in 120 BCE, they became rival competitors. The latter is infamously recorded in the Christian New Testament.

== Widespread adoption of Torah law ==
In his seminal Prolegomena zur Geschichte Israels (Prologue to the History of Israel) of 1878, Julius Wellhausen argued that Judaism as a religion based on widespread observance of Torah law first emerged in 444 BCE when, according to the biblical account provided in the Book of Nehemiah (chapter 8), a priestly scribe named Ezra read a copy of the Mosaic Torah before the populace of Judea assembled in a central Jerusalem square. Wellhausen believed that this narrative should be accepted as historical because it sounds plausible, noting: "The credibility of the narrative appears on the face of it." Following Wellhausen, most scholars throughout the 20th and early 21st centuries have accepted that widespread Torah observance began sometime around the middle of the 5th century BCE.

Yehezkel Kaufmann argues that the Priestly source is pre-exilic and that the priestly code in Torah is the codification of pre-prophetic ancient Israelite religion.

There is evidence in the Elephantine papyri and ostraca of the observance of Passover and Shabbat. However, the Jews in Elephantine may not have followed the Torah strictly, and may have been polytheistic. Konrad Schmid and Jens Schröter trace the formation of Torah law to the Persian period, and notice the paucity of surviving evidence in the Babylonian period, but note that Torah law's authority was exerted more strongly over time, with evidence of its adherence in the Dead Sea Scrolls.

Seth Schwartz believes that the Achaemenid Empire (i.e., the Persian period) likely imposed the Torah as authorized law and built the Temple in Jerusalem around 515 BCE.

More recently, Yonatan Adler argued in his 2022 book, The Origins of Judaism, that there is no surviving archeological evidence proving that the Torah was widely known, regarded as authoritative, and put into practice by average people, prior to the middle of the 2nd century BCE. Adler explored the likelihood that Judaism, as the widespread practice of Torah law by Jewish society at large, first emerged in Judea during the reign of the Hasmonean dynasty, centuries after the putative time of Ezra. This point of view is supported by Israeli archaeologist Israel Finkelstein.

Adler's novel thesis has been met with criticism. In his review of Adler's work, Benjamin D. Gordon argued that Adler relies on a questionable argument from silence to support his claim that the Torah was not widely observed before the 2nd century BCE. Gordon states that, since Judea in the Persian and early Hellenistic periods was sparsely populated and its material culture was nondescript and austere, the lack of evidence for Torah-observance during these periods "may simply reflect the limitations of our source material." Malka Z. Simkovich has also argued that there is some positive evidence that Jews from pre-Hasmonean times observed precepts from the Torah. Simkovich is critical of Adler's dismissal of pre-Hasmonean literary references to the Torah, such as the Book of Tobit from the 3rd century BCE, which references dietary and hygienic purity to demonstrate pious Jewish practice. Simkovich critiques Adler's radical thesis for dismissing this as reflective of elites and not of Persian period Torah practice. Ian Young believes Adler has made a strong and challenging case, but argues that Adler explains away evidence such as circumcision or the observance of the Sabbath with ad hoc arguments.

John J. Collins argues that Hecataeus of Abdera (c. 300 BCE) recorded that the written Mosaic law was already "known and accepted as the authoritative expression of the Jewish way of life at the beginning of the Hellenistic period". According to Collins, this implies that Jews had started observing the Torah already in the Persian period. Adler, in turn, has disputed the validity of quotations citing Hecataeus, as Hecateus's original work is lost, and it is unclear what later authors specifically attribute to Hecataeus in their descriptions of Jewish practice.

== Development of Rabbinic Judaism ==
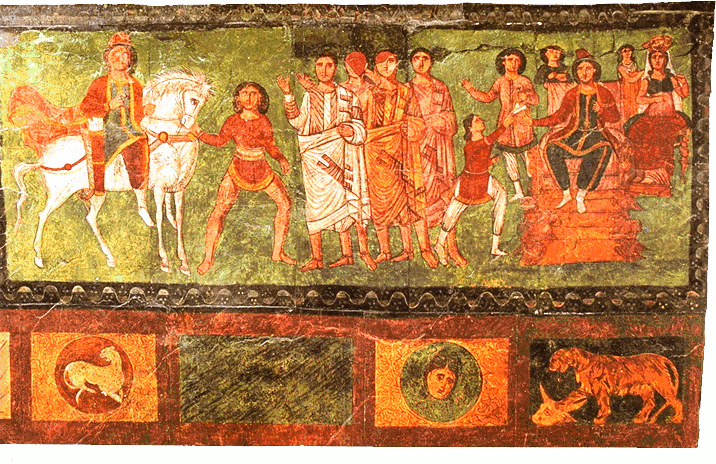
Scenes from the Book of Esther decorate the Dura-Europos synagogue dating from 244 CE

For centuries, the traditional understanding has been that the split of early Christianity and Judaism some time after the destruction of the Second Temple in 70 CE was the first major theological schism in Jewish tradition. Starting in the latter half of the 20th century, some scholars have begun to argue that the historical picture is more complicated.

By the 1st century, Second Temple Judaism was divided into competing theological factions, notably the Pharisees and the Sadducees, besides numerous smaller sects such as the Essenes, messianic movements such as Early Christianity, and closely related traditions such as Samaritanism (which gives us the Samaritan Pentateuch, an important witness of the text of the Torah independent of the Masoretic Text). The sect of Israelite worship that eventually became Rabbinic Judaism and the sect which developed into Early Christianity were but two of these separate Israelite religious traditions. Thus, some scholars have begun to propose a model which envisions a twin birth of Christianity and Rabbinic Judaism, rather than an evolution and separation of Christianity from Rabbinic Judaism. It is increasingly accepted among scholars that "at the end of the 1st century CE there were not yet two separate religions called 'Judaism' and 'Christianity'". Daniel Boyarin (2002) proposes a revised understanding of the interactions between nascent Christianity and nascent Rabbinic Judaism in Late Antiquity which views the two religions as intensely and complexly intertwined throughout this period.

The Amoraim were the Jewish scholars of Late Antiquity who codified and commented upon the law and the biblical texts. The final phase of redaction of the Talmud into its final form took place during the 6th century CE, by the scholars known as the Savoraim. This phase concludes the Chazal era foundational to Rabbinical Judaism.

== See also ==
- Atenism, the two-decade duration ancient Egyptian monotheistic religion of the 14th century BCE
- Hellenistic religion
- Historicity of the Bible
- Jewish history
- Jewish studies
- Maccabees
- Old Testament theology
- Religions of the ancient Near East
