= Aristobulus I =

Judah Aristobulus I
- King and High Priest of Judea
- Woodcut portrait from Promptuarii Iconum Insigniorum, 1553

King of Judea
- Reign: c. 104 – c. 103 BCE
- Predecessor: Monarchy established
- Successor: Alexander Jannaeus

High Priest of Judea
- Reign: c. 104 – c. 103 BCE
- Predecessor: John Hyrcanus
- Successor: Alexander Jannaeus
- Born: Jerusalem, Hasmonean Judea
- Died: 103 BCE; Jerusalem, Hasmonean Judea
- Dynasty: Hasmonean
- Father: John Hyrcanus
- Religion: Second Temple Judaism

Judah Aristobulus I, or Aristobulus I (/ˌærɪstəˈbjuːləs/; Greek: Ἀριστόβουλος, romanized: Aristóboulos), was the High Priest of Israel and the first Hasmonean king of Judea, reigning from 104 BCE until his death the next year, 103 BCE. He was the eldest of the five sons of John Hyrcanus, the previous leader. The Roman-Jewish historian Josephus states that he was the first Jew in "four hundred and eighty-three years and three months" to have established a monarchy since the return from the Babylonian captivity. Aristobulus was the first Hebrew king to claim both the high priesthood and the kingship. The Sadducees and the Essenes were not concerned about Aristobulus taking the title of king, but the Pharisees, believing that the kingship could only be held by the descendants of the Davidic line, strongly opposed this. They launched a massive rebellion, but Aristobulus died before any attempt to depose him could be made.

The major sources on Aristobulus's life from antiquity are Josephus's The Jewish War and Antiquities of the Jews. His reign is particularly noted for the Judaization of Galilee and the native Semitic people called the Ituraeans. Josephus, quoting from Strabo's Historica Hypomnemata, described Aristobulus's regime as kindly and "very serviceable to the Jews" on account of his conquests and the integration of "a portion of the Ituraean nation whom he joined to them by the bond of circumcision."

== Etymology ==
The name Aristobulus is of Greek origin and is an epithet meaning "best-advising." Aristobulus I was the first Hasmonean to adopt the name, but his Hebrew name was Judah. He was also referred to as Philhellene, meaning he was an admirer of Greek culture. Josephus does not explain why he was called this.

== Early campaigns and monarchy established ==
Aristobulus and his brother Antigonus were entrusted by their father, John Hyrcanus, with the conquest of Samaria. They laid siege to the city, and when the inhabitants requested aid from the Seleucid Empire, they defeated a relief army led by Antiochus IX Cyzicenus. Antiochus successfully escaped to Scythopolis, but the brothers captured Samaria towards the end of John's reign, razing the city and enslaving its inhabitants. Their forces subsequently captured Scythopolis and the entire region south of Mount Carmel.

According to John Hyrcanus's instructions, the country was to be placed in the hands of his wife after his death, and Aristobulus was originally to receive only the high priesthood. Instead, Aristobulus had his mother imprisoned, where she starved to death, thereby securing for himself both the high priesthood and the kingship. He then imprisoned all of his brothers, except for Antigonus, to protect himself from possible familial retaliation.

Josephus does not name Hyrcanus's wife. He states that Aristobulus and Antigonus were the eldest of the five brothers, with Aristobulus being the firstborn. The other three were Alexander Jannaeus, Absalom, and a fifth brother, whom Josephus mentions but does not name.

== Conquest of Galilee ==
Aristobulus went to war against the Ituraeans and took territory from them. The conquered Ituraeans were compelled to accept Jewish law and circumcision to remain on their land. The Ituraeans were an Arab tribe that expanded southwards from the Lebanese Beq'a into the Golan Heights and Mount Hermon in the fourth century BCE following the collapse of the Seleucid Empire. They are first mentioned in Josephus's Antiquities 13.319 during Aristobulus I's conquest, where Josephus writes, "He brought over to them a portion of the Ituraean nation."

Josephus's Antiquities 13.319 is a quote from Strabo's Historica Hypomnemata, originally written by Timagenes, and states, "This man was a kindly person and very serviceable to the Jews, for he acquired additional territory for them and brought over to them a portion of the Ituraean nation, whom he joined to them by the bond of circumcision." This passage has been generally accepted as evidence of Josephus's reliance on Strabo and Timagenes's writings. The exact location of the confrontation and the territory that the Ituraeans occupied are unknown. Most scholars assume the Ituraean territory to be northern Galilee. According to Kenneth Atkinson, there is no evidence of forced Judaization in Galilee during Aristobulus's reign.

== Death and successor ==
=== Feast of Tabernacles ===
With sudden abdominal pains, Aristobulus's health gradually deteriorated, compelling him to return to his palace during the festival of Sukkot. His brother Antigonus eventually returned to Jerusalem to celebrate the festival at the Temple. Unfamiliar with ceremonial festivities, Antigonus arrived armed with escorting soldiers. According to Kenneth Atkinson, Antigonus had returned from a successful, unspecified military campaign. He further states that Josephus did not mention the location of the campaign. Atkinson presumes it to be Galilee since Antigonus had fine armour and military decorations procured in the region, as stated in Josephus's Jewish War 1.76.

According to Josephus, Aristobulus fell prey to the factious influence of his wife and conspirators. They had spread rumours about Antigonus attempting to seize the throne once he was seen in armour at the festival. Wearing a military uniform was considered unorthodox during the occasion. Aristobulus was then informed by "evil men" that his brother was sending soldiers to murder him, and Aristobulus became estranged from Antigonus after hearing this rumour. Believing the report, he lowered himself into the fortified citadel Baris, which was besieged and had defensive towers.

=== Death of Antigonus and Aristobulus ===
The queen, contemplating the possibility of being tortured and killed if Antigonus became king once Aristobulus died from his deteriorating health, deliberately advised Antigonus to enter, armed, into a meeting with his brother. However, he had been summoned to address suspicions of conspiracy against his brother's life. The queen had bribed the messenger whom Aristobulus had sent to his brother; she altered the original message. Instead of having Antigonus arrive at his brother's palace unarmed, she suggested that Antigonus should wear his new body armour, which he had made in Galilee as a presentation upon Aristobulus's request. Incensed with suspicion at finding his brother armed, Aristobulus killed him. In frantic regret at this rash execution, Aristobulus's health drastically declined until his death shortly thereafter. The queen then released Aristobulus's brothers, selecting Alexander Jannaeus as the next king.

== Coinage ==
The minting of Hasmonean coins did not commence until the leadership of John Hyrcanus. Like his father, Aristobulus minted his coins solely with the title of high priesthood, using Hebrew inscriptions. It was not until Alexander Jannaeus that both the roles of kingship and high priesthood were minted onto the coins.

The majority of Aristobulus's coins were discovered primarily in the regions of Galilee and Golan, with the largest quantity originating from Gamla. By 2016, archaeologists had unearthed thirty coins at Gamla, the largest quantity to date. Most of these coins were minted during his actual reign, while a small number were minted afterward.

The numismatic evidence does not suggest that Aristobulus assumed the title of king. There is also the possibility that the coins could be attributed to Aristobulus II (67–63 BCE), who was also a king and high priest. However, the longstanding debate has leaned more towards Aristobulus I, as new numismatic evidence indicates that Aristobulus I had his coins minted with the name "Judah".

Due to his short reign of one year, only a small number of coins bearing the name "Judah" are available. Ya'akov Meshorer categorised them into two groups. Twenty coins are inscribed with "Jehudah the high priest and the assembly of the Jews", and another seven with the same inscriptions. Each coin has a value of one prutah and bears the inscriptions in a wreath. On the opposite side, there is a cornucopia with pomegranates between them. The inscriptions on his coins are almost identical to those on the coins of his father and his brother Alexander Jannaeus.

Doubts concerning Josephus's assertion that Aristobulus was the first Hasmonean monarch are indicated by his coins, which do not contain the title of "king." Josephus's statement also conflicts with Strabo, who states that Alexander Jannaeus was the first king rather than a high priest. However, no Hasmonean relinquished the high priesthood in favour of the kingship.

According to Kenneth Atkinson, Alexander Jannaeus faced opposition for having the kingship title minted on his coins. Alexander had many of those coins overstruck to replace the kingship title with that of the high priesthood. Atkinson considers the overstruck coins as evidence that the title of "king" was still problematic during Alexander's reign. Atkinson concludes that "the absence of any royal designation on Aristobulus's coins does not indicate that he was never an actual monarch."

== Bibliography ==
- Atkinson, Kenneth (2016). A History of the Hasmonean State: Josephus and Beyond. Bloomsbury Publishing. ISBN 9780567669032.
- Buth, Randall; Notley, R. Steven (2013). The Language Environment of First Century Judaea: Jerusalem Studies in the Synoptic Gospels (PDF). BRILL. ISBN 9789004264410. Archived from the original (PDF) on December 19, 2023.
- Coogan, Michael D. (2001). The Oxford History of the Biblical World. Oxford University Press. ISBN 9780195139372. OCLC 44650958.
- Elwell, Walter A.; Comfort, Philip Wesley (2001). Tyndale Bible Dictionary. Tyndale House Publishers. ISBN 9780842370899.
- Gelb, Norman (2010). Kings of the Jews: The Origins of the Jewish Nation. Jewish Publication Society. ISBN 9780827609136.
- Gruen, Erich S. (2002). Heritage and Hellenism: The Reinvention of Jewish Tradition. University of California Press. ISBN 9780520235069.
- Leeming, Henry; Leeming, Kate (2002). Josephus' Jewish War and its Slavonic Version: A Synoptic Comparison. BRILL. ISBN 9789004331143.
- Myers, E. A. (2010). The Ituraeans and the Roman Near East: Reassessing the Sources. Cambridge University Press. ISBN 9781139484817.
- Regev, Eyal (2013). The Hasmoneans: Ideology, Archaeology, Identity. Vandenhoeck & Ruprecht. ISBN 9783525550434.
- VanderKam, James C. (2004). From Joshua to Caiaphas: High Priests After the Exile. Fortress Press. ISBN 9781451410662.
- Wine, Sherwin T. (2012). A Provocative People: A Secular History of the Jews. IISHJ-NA. ISBN 9780985151607.

Aristobulus I Hasmonean Dynasty Died: 103 BCE
Jewish titles
Preceded by John Hyrcanus I	King of Judea; 104–103 BCE	Succeeded by Alexander Jannaeus
Preceded by John Hyrcanus I	High Priest of Judea; 104–103 BCE	Succeeded by Alexander Jannaeus
