= First Jewish Revolt coinage =

Coins minted by the Jews of Judaea during the First Jewish–Roman War

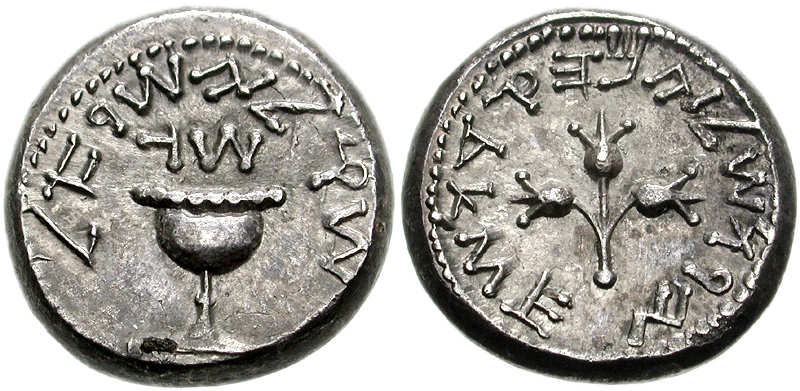
A coin issued by the Jewish rebels in 68–69 CE, note Paleo-Hebrew alphabet. Obverse: 𐤔𐤒𐤋 𐤉𐤔𐤓𐤀𐤋 "Shekel, Israel. Year 3". Reverse: 𐤉𐤓𐤅𐤔𐤋𐤉𐤌 𐤄𐤒𐤃𐤅𐤔𐤄 "Jerusalem the Holy".

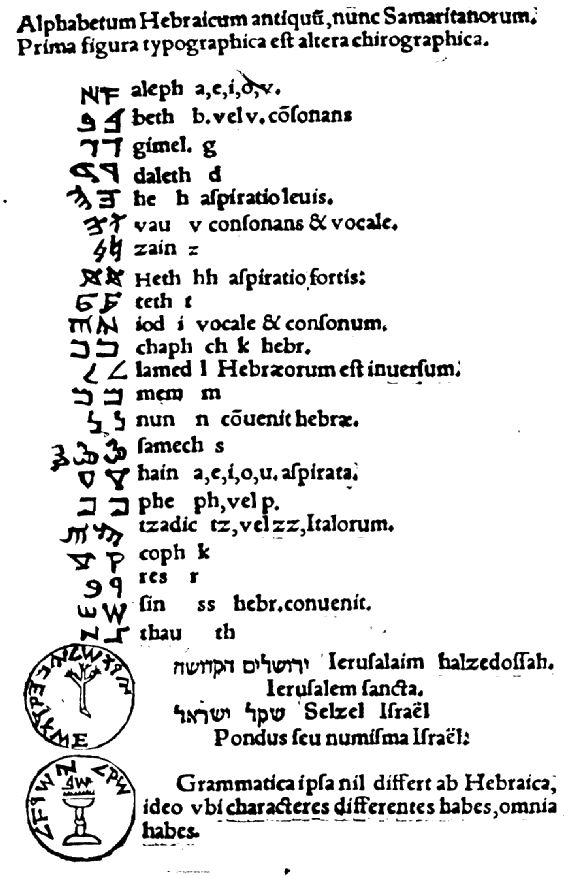
In 1538 Guillaume Postel published the Samaritan alphabet, together with the first Western representation of a Hasmonean coin. This predates publication of all known Canaanite and Aramaic inscriptions.

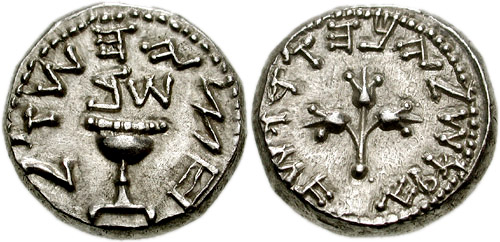
Half Shekel coin issued by the Jewish rebels in 67–68 CE, note Paleo-Hebrew alphabet. Obverse: "Half Shekel Year 2". Reverse: "Jerusalem the Holy".

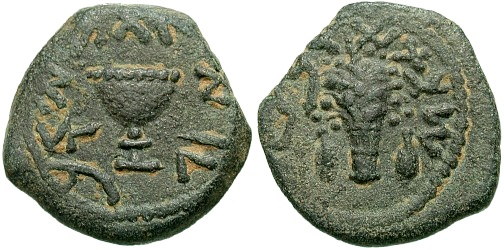
Bronze prutah eighth of a shekel of year 4 (69–70 CE) issued during the First Jewish Revolt.

First Jewish Revolt coinage refers to the series of coins minted by Jewish rebels during the First Jewish–Roman War (66–73 CE). These coins adopted distinctly Jewish symbols, such as pomegranates, lulavs (palm branches), and Hebrew inscriptions in the paleo-Hebrew script proclaiming messages like "For the Freedom of Zion" and "Jerusalem the Holy." The coinage, which included silver shekels and bronze denominations, marked a revival of Jewish political independence, with years dated according to the revolt. Beyond their economic role, the coins served as a symbol of resistance against Roman rule and an assertion of Jewish sovereignty and economic freedom. It is now accepted that they were minted in Jerusalem.

== History ==
In the Revolt's first year (66–67 CE), the Jews minted only silver coins, which were struck from the Temple's store of silver. This was the first instance of silver coinage in Jewish history. The newly minted silver coins included shekels, half-shekels, and quarter-shekels, each being labelled with the year of minting and their denomination. and depict a chalice on the obverse with the year of the revolt above, surrounded by the ancient Hebrew inscription "Shekel of Israel". Three budding pomegranates are featured on the reverse, with the inscription "Jerusalem the Holy".

During the second (67–68 CE) and third (68–69 CE) years of the Revolt bronze prutah coins were issued, depicting an amphora, and with the date and the Hebrew inscription (חרות ציוןhola Herut Zion)"The Freedom of Zion".

In the fourth year of the revolt (69–70 CE) three large sizes of bronze coins were minted, possibly because the supplies of Temple silver were diminishing. It is believed by numismatists that these coins were fractions of a shekel. The smaller of these coins also has the depiction of a chalice, together with symbols of the Jewish harvest festival of Sukkot, a lulav and etrog, and the date and inscription "For the Redemption of Zion". This coin is usually called an 'eighth', probably being an eighth of a shekel. There is broad scholarly agreement that coins issued by the Judean government during the Revolt use an archaic Hebrew script and Jewish symbols including pomegranate buds, lulavs, etrogs, and phrases including "Shekel of Israel," and "The Freedom of Zion" (חרות ציון Herut Zion,) as political statements intended to rally support for independence.

The medium size coin has the same inscription, with the denomination "reva" (quarter) inscribed. An etrog is depicted on the obverse, and two lulav are on the reverse. The larger of the three bronze coins are inscribed "chatzi" (half). On the obverse a lulav and etrog are again depicted, with a palm tree and baskets on the reverse. These coins are sometimes referred to as 'Masada coins'.

Robert Deutsch assumed that the coins would not have been easily readable by the general population, as by this period, the Paleo-Hebrew script had become obsolete, with the square Jewish script becoming more dominant. According to Hannah Cotton, the use of Hebrew represented Jewish nationalism and served to promote the ideology of the independent Jewish state. Jonathan Price notes that "the palaeo-Hebrew letters strengthened the nationalistic declaration."

== Research ==
The coins, which have been known since medieval times, were formerly described as having Samaritan inscriptions. It was not until the mid-20th century that they were correctly attributed to the First Jewish Revolt.

== Hoards ==
Five hoards of bronze coins from the revolt were documented as of 2017. One of these was discovered at the desert fortress of Herodium in 1968/1969, containing 19 coins: 3 from the 2nd year and 16 from the 4th. A second hoard was discovered on the street near Robinson's Arch in Jerusalem, with over 100 coins, most of them from the 2nd year, but also some from the 3rd and 4th years, as well as one coin of an unnamed Roman governor.

In 2014, another hoard was uncovered at Horbat Mazruq, the site of an ancient Jewish village near Kiryat Ye'arim. It included 114 uncirculated coins, all in excellent condition and dating from the 4th year of the revolt. It is believed that the coins were hidden by someone on a reconnaissance mission, sent to territory already captured by the Romans.

== Interpretation ==
According to historian David Goodblatt, the use of the term "Freedom to Zion" on circulating coinage aimed to convey the rebels' goals to the masses, mobilizing them to fight for Zion. This can be compared to the ideals expressed in modern Zionism, particularly in the anthem "Hatikvah," suggesting that the rebels' ideology may be characterized as an early form of Zionism, "Zion nationalism."

According to James S. McLaren, the names inscribed on the coins may represent three levels of identity: "Zion," referring to the Temple Mount; "Jerusalem," signifying its location; and "Israel," denoting the new Jewish state with Jerusalem as its capital.

== See also ==
- Historical currencies in Judaea
  - Ma'ah, Aramaic for gerah, ancient Hebrew unit of weight and currency
  - Shekel, ancient Near Eastern unit of weight and coin
  - Zuz, ancient Jewish name for certain silver coinage
  - Prutah
- Judaean and Judaea-related coinage
  - Yehud coinage
  - Hasmonean coinage
  - Herodian coinage
  - Procuratorial coinage of Roman Judaea
  - Judaea Capta coinage
  - Bar Kokhba Revolt coinage
- List of historical currencies

== Bibliography ==
- Ariel, Donald T. (2011). "Identifying the Mints, Minters and Meanings of the First Jewish Revolt Coins". In Popovic, Mladen (ed.). The Jewish Revolt Against Rome: Interdisciplinary Perspectives. BRILL. pp. 373–397. ISBN 978-90-04-21668-6.
- Cotton, Hannah M. (2022). Pogorelsky, Ofer (ed.). Roman Rule and Jewish Life: Collected Papers. Studia Judaica. Vol. 89. De Gruyter. doi:10.1515/9783110770438. ISBN 978-3-110-77043-8. Archived from the original on 22 December 2024.
- Deutsch, Robert (2011). "Coinage of the First Jewish Revolt Against Rome: Iconography, Minting Authority, Metallurgy". In Popovic, Mladen (ed.). The Jewish Revolt Against Rome: Interdisciplinary Perspectives. BRILL. pp. 361–372. ISBN 978-90-04-21668-6.
- G. F. Hill, Catalogue of the Greek Coins of Palestine (Galilee, Samaria, and Judaea), London: British Museum Dept. of Coins and Medals, 1914.
- Hendin, David (2013). "Current Viewpoints on Ancient Jewish Coinage: A Bibliographic Essay". Currents in Biblical Research. 11 (2): 246–301. doi:10.1177/1476993X12459634. ISSN 1476-993X.
- Kadman, Leo, The Coins of the Jewish War of 66-73. Corpus Nummorum Palestinensium III. (Jerusalem, 1960).
- Price, Jonathan J. (1992). Jerusalem under Siege: The Collapse of the Jewish State, 66-70 C.E. Brill's Series in Jewish Studies. Vol. 3. Brill. ISBN 978-9-004-09471-0.
- Robert Deutsch, 2012, The Coinage of the Great Jewish Revolt Against Rome: Script, Language and Inscriptions, in: Judaea and Rome in Coins 65BCE – 135 CE, edited by D.M. Jacobson and N. Kokkinos, pp. 113–122.
- Roth, Cecil. 1962. "The Historical Implications of the Jewish Coinage of the First Revolt." Israel Exploration Journal 12, no. 1: 33–46.
