= Herodian coinage =

Coins minted in Judaea, 37 BC – 92 AD

Herodian coinage were coins minted and issued by the Herodian Dynasty, Jews of Idumean descent who ruled the province of Judaea between 37 BC – 92 AD. The dynasty was founded by Herod the Great who was the son of Antipater, a powerful official under the Hasmonean King Hyrcanus II.

== Herod the Great, 37–4 BC ==
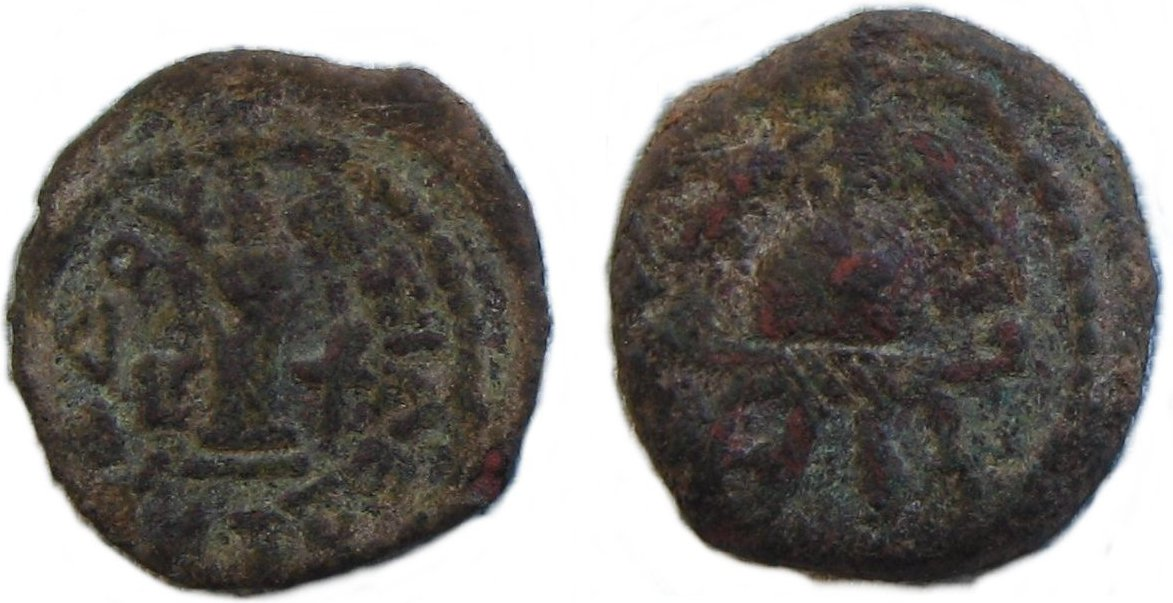
Largest coin of Herod the Great

(Obverse) Second largest coin of Herod. Greek letter Chi within a diadem

(Reverse) coin of Herod. Ceremonial bowl on a tripod

The coinage of Herod the Great continued the Jewish tradition of not depicting a graven image. However, a prutah of Herod was the first coin since the Persian period to depict a living creature — an eagle, which may have been an allusion to the golden eagle that Herod erected over the entrance to the Second Temple, and which caused such great offence to the Jews.

Other objects depicted on coins of Herod include a winged caduceus and pomegranate ('rimmôn'), one of the seven species mentioned in the Bible as blessings to the Land of Israel, a plumed helmet and shield, a ship's stern and a palm branch. The largest denomination coin issued by Herod, bears a year, "year 3", and displays a series of unusual designs, such as a helmet with long cheek pieces, surmounted by a star. The second largest denomination features a crested helmet and a shield, as well as the Greek letter Chi within a diadem and a tripod holding a ceremonial bowl. These designs are surrounded by the Greek inscription Ancient Greek: 'ΗΡΩΔΟΥ ΒΑΣΙΛΕΩΣ' (of Herod Basileus, of King Herod).

The Greek letter Chi representing the "crown of Kehunah (High Priest)" and the diadem representing the "crown of Malchus (Kingness)" (BT: Horayot, Keritot) are taken to mean that Herod claimed both offices for himself.

The most common prutah issued by Herod the Great is similar in design to that of the Hashmonean coinage, an anchor with Greek inscription "ΉΡωΔ ΒΆCΙ" (King Herod), and a caduceus between double cornucopiae, which was meant as a continuation of the Hashmonean coinage as well as a continuation of the Hasmonean dynasty. However, Herod used only the Greek script on his coins, not the dual Greek and Hebrew method of the Hasmoneans.

== Herod Archelaus, 4 BC – 6 AD ==
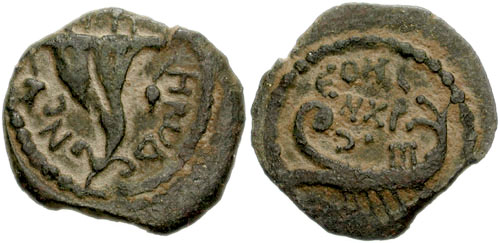
Coin of Herod Archelaus

The most common coins of Herod Archelaus are small prutot depicting a bunch of grapes, also one of the seven species, and a crested helmet with his name (Herod) and title (Ethnarch) in Greek (ΗΡΩΔ ΕΘΝ), and a ship's prow and wreath with his name and title abbreviated. Grapes were commonly depicted on Jewish coins, serving as s reminder of the fertility of the country. Other coins of Archelaus showed the bow of a ship and a laurel wreath.

A rare double prutah of Herod Archelaus depicts a galley and conjoined double cornucopiae, also inscribed in Greek with his name and title.

== Herod Antipas, 4 BC – 39 AD ==
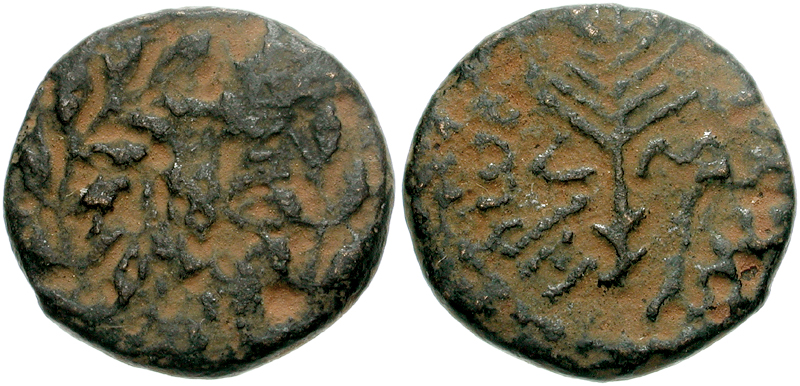
Coin of Herod Antipas

The coinage of Herod Antipas is rather rare, and can be divided into four categories: i) coins dated 'year 24' with the inscription 'ΤΙΒΕΡΙΑC' (Tiberias), where the coins were minted, contained within a wreath on the reverse; ii) coins from the years 33, 34 or 37, which also have the inscription 'ΤΙΒΕΡΙΑC' on the reverse; iii) coins dated 'year 43' with the inscription ΓΑΙΩ ΚΑΙCΑΡΙ ΓΕΡΜΑΝΙΚΩ (Gaius Caesar Germanicus) on the reverse; iv) only one known example of a coin dated 'year 4' with the inscription ΤΕΤΡΑ—ΗCΔ, ΗΡΩ[Δ].

The coinage of Herod Antipas was minted in four denominations, with the inscription 'ΤΙΒΕΡΙΑC' on the reverse within a wreath. The obverse has the Greek inscription "Herod the Tetrarch" (ΗΡΩΔΟΥ ΤΕΤΡΑΡΧΟΥ) with an upright palm branch. A variant type depicted an upright reed.

== Philip, 4 BC – 34 AD ==
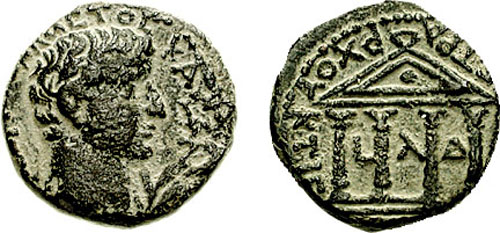
Coin of Philip, 30–31 AD

The coins of Philip are mostly bronze of middle-size. He was the first Jewish ruler to put portraits of himself and the Roman Emperors on his coinage. An early issue has a portrait of the Emperor Augustus, with the Greek inscription 'KAICAPI CEBACTΩ' on the obverse, and 'ΦΙΛΙΠΠΟΥ ΤΕΤΡΑΡΧΟΥ' on the reverse. Later coins depicted Tiberius on the obverse, with the inscription 'TIBEPIOΣ ΣEBAΣ', and 'ΦΙΛΙΠΠΟΥ ΤΕΤΡΑΡΧΟΥ' on the reverse. Both types had the facade of a four-columned temple on the reverse, possibly the Temple in Jerusalem. The coins are dated according to the year of the Emperor's reign.

== Herod Agrippa I, 37–44 AD ==
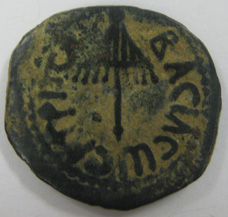
Most common prutah of Agrippa I (Obverse). Inscription "of king Agrippa"

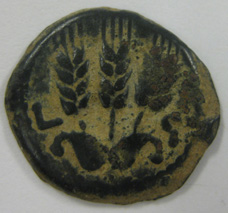
Prutah of Agrippa I (Reverse), inscription "year 5"

Agrippa I was the son of Aristobulus and Berenice, and was a grandson of Herod the Great. Agrippa spent much of his boyhood at the Imperial court in Rome. His friend, the Emperor Caligula, granted him the former territories of his uncles Philip and Herod Antipas. The Emperor Claudius later also added Judaea. The most common prutah issued by Agrippa I shows a royal fringed umbrella-like canopy on the obverse, with the inscription 'ΑΓΡΙΠΑ BACIΛEΩC' ('King Agrippa') in Greek, while the reverse shows three ears of barley between two leaves with the year. All the other coins of Herod Agrippa I contain graven images, with portraits of the Emperor or even of Agrippa himself. A very rare issue has a portrait of Agrippa with his son Agrippa II on horseback.

== Herod Agrippa II, 55–92 AD ==
Agrippa II was the last ruler of the Herodian Dynasty. His coins include both Jewish and pagan symbolism. A Jewish type, for example, depicts a palm branch on the obverse with the inscription 'ΚΛΑΥΔΙΟΥ KAICAPOC' (Claudius Caesar) in Greek, and a wreath on the reverse surrounding the inscription 'TIBERIAC' ('Tiberias'), also in Greek. In 66 AD he issued a prutah showing his own bust on the obverse with the Greek inscription 'ΒΑΣΙΛΕΩΣ ΑΓΡΙΠΠΟΥ' (King Agrippa). The coin's reverse depicts an anchor with the letters L and I on either side, giving the tenth year of the king's reign. Agrippa II also minted a 'Judaea Capta' coin. This large bronze coin was minted at Tiberias and shows a portrait of Titus on the obverse with the Greek inscription ' KAICAP CEBAC AVTOKP TITOC', while the reverse depicts the goddess Nike advancing right holding a wreath and palm branch over her shoulder, with a star in upper right field and the inscription 'ETO – KC BA ΑΓΡΙ-PPA'.

Another coin of Agrippa was issued in the name of Claudia, the daughter of Nero. These coins show a temple with a seated figure within and the inscription 'DIVA POPPAEA AVG' on the obverse, while the reverse shows a round temple with a female figure standing within and the Greek inscription 'DIVA CLAVD NER F'.

== Salome ==
Although not a ruler of Judaea, Salome is included here because she was a granddaughter of Herod the Great and therefore was a member of the Herodian Dynasty. As the queen of Chalcis and Armenia Minor she appeared on the reverse of coinage issued by her husband, Aristobulus of Chalcis. Minted in 56–57 AD, only three copies of this coin, all quite worn, have been discovered to date.

The obverse depicts Aristobulus with the Greek inscription 'BACIΛEΩC APIΣΤΟΒΟΥΛΟΥ' (King Aristobulus), while the reverse shows Salome and, on one example, the Greek inscription 'BACIΛIC ΣΑΛΩΜΗ' (Queen Salome).

== See also ==
- Historical currencies in Judaea
  - Ma'ah, Aramaic for gerah, ancient Hebrew unit of weight and currency
  - Prutah
  - Shekel, ancient Near Eastern unit of weight and coin
  - Zuz, ancient Jewish name for certain silver coinage
- Judaean and Judaea-related coinage
  - Yehud coinage
  - Hasmonean coinage
  - Procuratorial coinage of Roman Judaea
  - First Jewish Revolt coinage
  - Judaea Capta coinage
  - Bar Kokhba Revolt coinage
- List of historical currencies
- Temple in Jerusalem
  - Second Temple
  - Herod's Temple
