= Bar Kokhba Revolt coinage =

Coins used by the Jewish rebel state during the Bar Kokhba Revolt

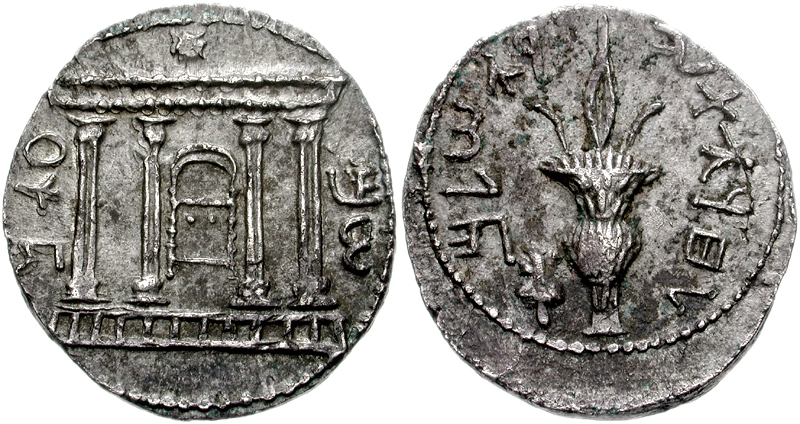
Bar Kokhba silver shekel/tetradrachm. Obverse: the Jewish Temple facade with the rising star, surrounded by "Shimon". Reverse: A lulav, the text reads: "to the freedom of Jerusalem".

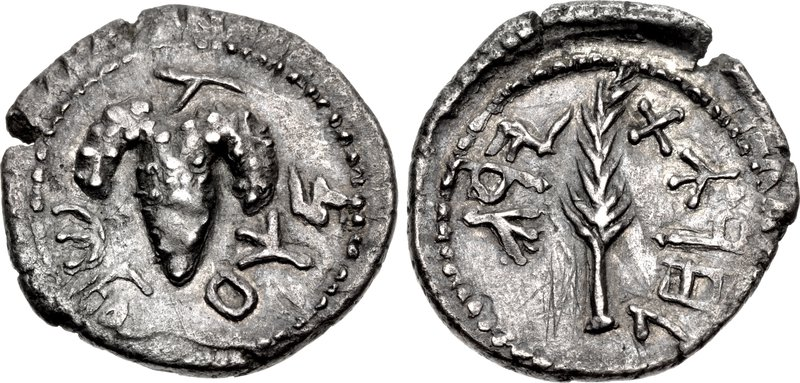
Bar Kokhba silver zuz/denarius, Undated, but attributed to year 3 (134-135 CE). Obverse: the Grape bunch on vine, surrounded by the name “Shim‘on” in paleo-Hebrew. Reverse: A palm branch surrounded by the phrase "to the freedom of Jerusalem"

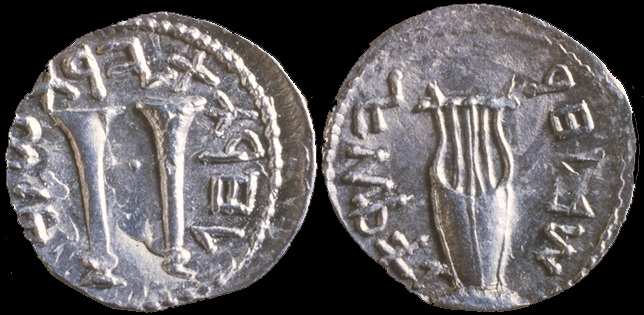
Bar Kokhba silver zuz/denarius. Obverse: trumpets surrounded by "To the freedom of Jerusalem". Reverse: A lyre surrounded by "Year two to the freedom of Israel"

Bar Kokhba Revolt coinage were coins issued by the Judaean rebel state, headed by Simon Bar Kokhba, during the Bar Kokhba Revolt against the Roman Empire of 132–135 CE.

== Description ==
The Bar Kokhba administration produced a series of silver and bronze coins by overstriking Roman currency. The imperial coins, which originally displayed Roman iconography such as portraits of the Roman Emperors, were restamped with Jewish symbols and Hebrew inscriptions.

The coins suggest that restoring the Temple in Jerusalem and its services was indeed a key goal, as they feature the façade of the then-destroyed Second Temple along with other related symbols.

=== Language ===
The coinage was inscribed in Hebrew, which by this period had already seen a decline in favor of the Aramaic language. This was part of a broader resurgence of the use of Hebrew during the revolt, as had occurred in two earlier stages: a similar resurgence took place during both the Hasmonean era (mid-2nd to mid-1st century BCE) and the First Jewish–Roman War (66–73 CE). By using the language on coins and official documents, the rebels reinforced its role as a primary symbol of Jewish nationhood and political independence. The inscriptions on Bar Kokhba coinage were written using the Paleo-Hebrew alphabet, the archaic script of the biblical period, rather than the Aramaic square script that was more dominant at the time.

=== Mentions of individuals ===
Simon bar Kokhba, the leader of the revolt, is often presented on the coinage as "Simeon, Prince of Israel." Issues from the first year also bear the name "Eleazar the Priest," though the identity of this figure remains unknown. Some scholars identify him as Eleazar of Modi'im, Bar Kokhba's uncle, who, according to rabbinic literature, was killed by Bar Kokhba during the Roman siege of Betar for allegedly seeking a negotiated surrender. Regardless of his identity, the inclusion of a priest on the coinage suggests that the Bar Kokhba administration was preparing for the reconstruction of the Temple and the reinstatement of the high priesthood.

=== Iconography and slogans ===
Silver tetradrachms from the first year of the revolt feature the façade of the Second Temple on the obverse, accompanied by the word "Jerusalem." The reverse displays two of the four species used ceremonially during the Jewish festival of Sukkot (Tabernacles): a lulav (closed frond of a date palm) and an etrog (citron) are depicted alongside the inscription "Year One of the Redemption of Israel." The exact start of "year one" of the administration remains debated, with some scholars proposing Nisan (March/April) 132, while others suggest the summer or fall of that year.

For coins from the second year and undated coins, additional slogans appear, including "For the Freedom of Israel" and "For the Freedom of Jerusalem." Also depicted on the coins are grapevines, palm trees, musical instruments (including harps and trumpets), and Temple vessels (including amphorae and jugs).

== Geographic distribution ==
=== Judea ===
As of 2024, coin distribution spans the entirety of Judea, from the Beersheba region in the south to the Aqraba region in the north. The findings suggest the continuation of rebel activity in these areas into the third year of the revolt. The southernmost finds were recorded at Ein Bokek and at the Nahal Yatir site, while the northernmost specimens were discovered at Tel Shiloh and the Wadi er-Rashash cave.

Many of the coins were discovered in hoards. This phenomenon is also described in a baraita (an early rabbinic tradition preserved outside the Mishnah). Jews who hid these coins were later unable to recover them due to the presence of Roman garrisons, their deaths during the revolt's suppression, or the widespread destruction that obscured the hiding places. Over thirty such hoards have been found, more than from any other decade.

=== Sharon Plain ===
Outside Judea proper, specimens have been identified at four sites in the Sharon Plain: Caesarea, Tel Hefer, Tel Michal and Mikhmoret. These are likely souvenirs kept by Roman soldiers; one specimen, for example, was found with a hole drilled for use as a pendant.

==== Jerusalem ====
Despite being a primary rebel objective, Jerusalem has yielded only five Bar Kokhba coins as of 2024. This scarcity, five coins out of 15,000 discovered in the city to date, suggests the rebels never successfully captured the city from the Roman garrison. Scholars suggest these few coins may have been brought to the city by Roman soldiers as spoils from dead or captured rebels.

In May 2020, a coin embossed with grapes and 'Year Two of the Freedom of Israel' was found in the Davidson Archaeological Park next to the Western Wall in Jerusalem. This was only the fourth coin from this period to be found in the area, and the only Bar Kokhba coin to have Jerusalem's name on it.

=== Outside Judaea ===
As of 2023, twenty-four coins of the Bar Kokhba revolt were found outside Judaea, in various locations in the United Kingdom, Austria, Hungary, Romania and Croatia. That includes one coin in London, then part of Britannia, twelve in Pannonia (at Vindobona, Carnuntum, and Brigetio), and three in Dacia (at Sarmizegetusa, Ilișua, and Pojejena). The only specimen recovered from a civil settlement was found in Iader in Dalmatia. These coins may have been brought as souvenirs or spoils of war by Roman soldiers who fought in Judaea or, alternatively, by Jewish refugees or enslaved captives who reached these regions afterward.

== Research history ==
The first group of these coins reviewed by numismatists were 10 silver pieces and one bronze piece found in the mid-nineteenth century. By 1881 the number of coins had grown to 43, and many more have been found since. These coins were first attributed to Bar Kokhba by Moritz Abraham Levy in 1862 and Frederic Madden in 1864.

Before modern numismatists reached a consensus on their origin, scholars in the 19th and early 20th centuries argued who actually minted the coins. Claude Reignier Conder, writing in 1909, suggested that the coins were forgeries of the coins of Simon Thassi, founder of the Hasmonean dynasty. Wolf Wirgin, writing in 1959, suggested that the coins were instead minted by King Herod Agrippa. Alice Muehsam, writing in 1966, suggested that those coins with dates such as "Year 1" were actually First Jewish Revolt coinage.

In 1960, Roman written documents of the Bar Kokhba Revolt and coinage were found in the Cave of Letters.

== See also ==
- Archaeology of the Bar Kokhba Revolt
- Historical currencies in Judaea
  - Ma'ah, Aramaic for gerah, ancient Hebrew unit of weight and currency
  - Prutah, small denomination coin of the Second Temple period
  - Shekel, ancient Near Eastern unit of weight and coin
  - Zuz, ancient Jewish name for certain silver coinage
- Judaean and Judaea-related coinage
  - Yehud coinage
  - Hasmonean coinage
  - Herodian coinage
  - Procuratorial coinage of Roman Judaea
  - First Jewish Revolt coinage
  - Judaea Capta coinage
- List of historical currencies

== Bibliography ==
- Cesarik, Nikola; Filipčić, Damir; Kramberger, Vlatka (2018). "Bar Kokhba's bronze coin from Kolovare Beach in Zadar". Journal of the Archaeological Museum in Zadar. 32 (32).
- Eshel, Hanan (2006). "The Bar Kochba Revolt, 132–135". In Katz, Steven T. (ed.). The Late Roman-Rabbinic Period. The Cambridge History of Judaism. Vol. 4th. Cambridge University Press. pp. 105–127. ISBN 978-0-521-77248-8.
- Eshel, Hanan; Zissu, Boaz (2019). "The Refuge Caves". The Bar Kokhba Revolt: The Archaeological Evidence. Jerusalem: Yad Izhak Ben-Zvi. pp. 62–64. ISBN 978-965-217-429-1.
- Goodblatt, David M. (2006). Elements of Ancient Jewish Nationalism. Cambridge: Cambridge University Press. ISBN 978-0-521-86202-8.
- Hachlili, Rachel (1988). "The Bar Kokhba Period (132-135 BCE)". Ancient Jewish Art and Archaeology in the Land of Israel. Brill. pp. 128–132. doi:10.1163/9789004495630_015. ISBN 978-9-004-49563-0.
- Magness, Jodi (2012). The Archaeology of the Holy Land: From the Destruction of Solomon's Temple to the Muslim Conquest. Cambridge University Press. ISBN 978-1-139-01383-3.
- Mendels, Doron (1992). The Rise and Fall of Jewish Nationalism: Jewish and Christian Ethnicity in Ancient Palestine. Anchor Bible Reference Library. New York: Doubleday. ISBN 978-0-385-26126-5.
- Millar, Fergus (1995). The Roman Near East: 31 BC–AD 337. Harvard University Press. ISBN 978-0-674-77886-3.
- Raviv, Dvir; Zissu, Boaz (2024). "An Update on the Geographical Distribution of the Coins Minted by the Bar Kokhba". Israel Numismatic Research. 19: 71–88.
