= Prutah =

Denomination of coin

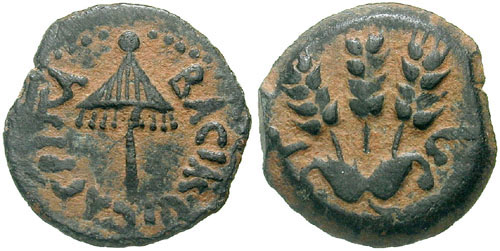
Pruta from the reign of Agrippa I

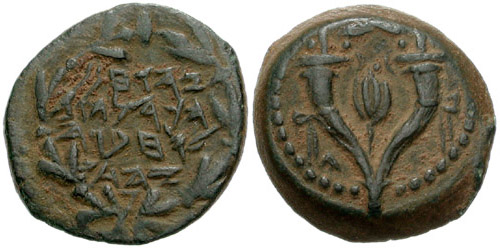
Prutah of John Hyrcanus (134 BCE to 104 BCE). Obv: Double cornucopia. Rev: Five lines of ancient Hebrew script; reading "Yehochanan Kohen Gadol Chever Hayehudim" (Yehochanan the High Priest, Council of the Jews)

Prutah (Hebrew: פרוטה) is a Hebrew term, possibly derived from Aramaic. It refers to a small denomination coin.

== History ==
=== Antiquity ===
The prutah was an ancient copper coin of the Second Temple period of Israel with low value. A loaf of bread in ancient times was worth about 10 prutot (plural of prutah). One prutah was also worth two lepta (singular lepton), which was the smallest denomination minted by the kings of the Hasmonean and Herodian dynasties.

Prutot were also minted by the procurators of Roman Judaea, and later were minted by the Jews during the First Jewish–Roman War (sometimes called "Masada coins").

=== State of Israel ===
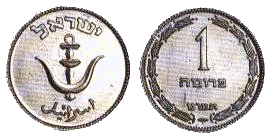
1 prutah coin

In modern times, the pruta was a denomination of currency in Israel.

The prutah was introduced shortly after the establishment of the state of Israel, as the 1000th part of the Israeli pound. It replaced the mil, which was the 1000th part of the Palestine pound, a currency issued by the British Mandate of Palestine prior to May 1948.

The prutah was abolished in 1960, when the Israeli government decided to change the subdivision of the Israeli pound into 100 agorot. This move was necessary due to the constant devaluation of the Israeli pound, which rendered coins smaller than 10 prutot redundant.

== See also ==
- Hasmonean coinage
- Herodian coinage
- Procuratorial coinage of Roman Judaea
- First Jewish Revolt coinage
- Bar Kokhba revolt coinage
- List of historical currencies
- Gerah
- Zuz
