= Hezekiah (governor) =

Last governor of Judah during the Persian period

Yehezqiyah (English: Hezekiah) was a local civil governor (Persian: peḥah), during the late 4th century BCE, in the province of Yehud Medinata, a district within the satrapy of Eber-Nari, in the Achaemenid Empire during the Persian-period.

His governorship may have continued with the conquest of the region by Alexander the Great in 332 BCE into the Hellenistic period. He is regarded as the last governor, as the Persian governorate was phased out during the partition of Alexander's empire and replaced by the governorate of Coele-Syria when it in 323 BCE became part of the part of the Satrapy of Egypt under the future king Ptolemy I Soter of the Ptolemaic Kingdom.

== Bio ==
=== "Yehezqiyah the governor" coins ===
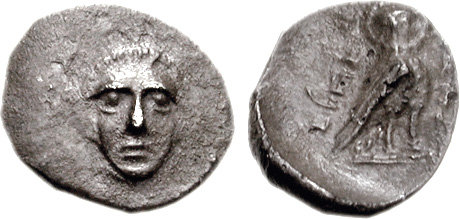
An example of the "Yehezqiyah/Hezekiah the governor" coin, ca. 350 BCE. The image of Hezekiah with the Persian title 'governor'. The Hebrew inscription is YḤZQKYH HPḤH: Yehezkiya (Yehizqiyah) the pehah

Yehezqiyah is identified as yhzqyh hphh, 'Yehezqiyah ha-pechah' ("Yehezqiyah the governor") by the inscription on a coin type dated to the late fourth century, possibly around 335 BCE, one of which was found at Beth Zur, and some specialists are arguing that the coin might also be of a slightly later date, from the time when Persian rule was replaced by the Ptolemaic. The inscription can also be rendered in English as "the governor Hezekiah".

Yehezqiyah coins are part of the Yehud coinage.

=== Josephus ===
He might be mentioned in writings by the historian Josephus (quoting Hecataeus of Abdera) as a Jewish leader.

Josephus (Against Apion, 1:187–189), mentions a prominent Jewish figure named Hezekiah who was a chief priest/leader and emigrated to Egypt under Ptolemy I. Some scholars have theorized that the governor Hezekiah and the Hezekiah mentioned by Josephus could be the same person.

== See also ==
- Governors of Yehud Medinata
