= Zuz (Jewish coin) =

Ancient Jewish silver coin

A Zuz (Hebrew: זוז; plural זוזים zuzim) was an ancient Jewish silver coin struck during the Bar Kokhba revolt as well as a Jewish name for the various types of non-Jewish small silver coinage, used before and after the period of the revolt. The name was used from the Greek era of drachmas, through the Roman era of Denarius, and then as the quarter denomination of Bar Kokhba Revolt coinage. The Jewish insurrectionists' zuzim were overstruck on Imperial denarii or provincial drachmas of the emperors Vespasian, Titus, Domitian, Trajan, and Hadrian. Four zuzim, denarii or drachmas make a shekel, a sela or a tetradrachm.

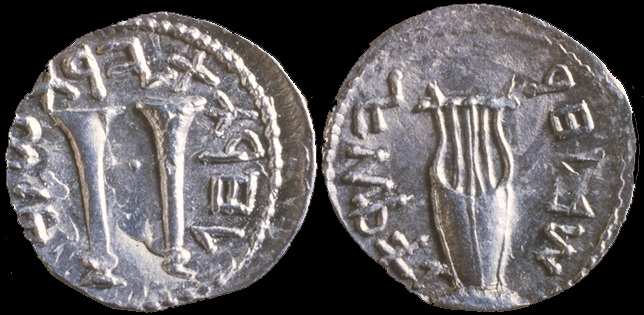
Bar Kochba silver Zuz/denarius. Obverse: trumpets surrounded by "To the freedom of Jerusalem". Reverse: A lyre surrounded by "Year two to the freedom of Israel"

== Etymology ==
Several different etymologies have been suggested for the word "zuz":

- A corruption of the Greek Zeus, who was the deity portrayed on the reverse of many Seleucid tetradrachms during the latest stages of the Seleucid Empire.
- In Hebrew, the word "zuz" means "move", or "to move", so it was called "zuzim" to show that it was constantly moving around, usually referring to the fact that Jews must give charity, or referring to the nature of money that it moves from one person to another, alternating who is wealthy.
- Related to a root (not occurring in the Hebrew Bible) meaning "shining" or "glittering".
- According to Stephen Kaufman, zūzu is of Akkadian origin. American Heritage Dictionary also states: "from Akkadian zūze, half, division, unit of weight, from zâzu, to divide".

== Usage ==
In the Talmud, the zuz and the dinar are used interchangeably, the difference being that the zuz originally referred to the Greek Drachma (which was a quarter of the Greek Tetradrachm, which weighed approximately 17 grams) while the dinar referred to the later Roman Denarius (which was a quarter of the Tyrian shekels and had the same weight as the Jerusalem Shekels and the Roman provincial Tetradrachms at approximately 14 grams).

The zuz is mentioned in the Haggadah in the Passover song "Chad gadya, chad gadya" ("One little goat, one little goat"); in which the lyric of dizabin abba bitrei zuzei ("Which Father bought for two zuzim (half shekels)) repeats at the end of every stanza. It may be significant that two zuzim equal the half-shekel tax required of every adult male Israelite in Exodus 30:13.

== See also ==
- List of historical currencies
- First Jewish Revolt coinage
- Gerah
- Prutah
