= John Hyrcanus =

Hasmonean ruler

- John Hyrcanus from Guillaume Rouillé's Promptuarii Iconum Insigniorum

Prince of Judaea
- Reign: 134–104 BCE
- Predecessor: Simon Thassi
- Successor: Aristobulus I

High Priest of Judaea
- Reign: 134–104 BCE
- Predecessor: Simon Thassi
- Successor: Aristobulus I
- Born: 164 BCE
- Died: 104 BCE
- Burial: Jerusalem
- Issue: Aristobulus I Alexander Jannaeus; Antigonus I Absalom fifth son, unnamed
- Dynasty: Hasmonean
- Father: Simon Thassi
- Religion: Hellenistic Judaism

John Hyrcanus (/hɜːrˈkeɪnəs/; Hebrew: יוחנן הרקנוס, romanized: Yoḥānān Hurqanos; Koine Greek: Ἰωάννης Ὑρκανός, romanized: Iōánnēs Hyrkanós) was a Jewish high priest and ruler of Judea from the Hasmonean dynasty (born 164 BCE, reigned from 134 BCE until he died in 104 BCE). In rabbinic literature he is often referred to as Yoḥanan Cohen Gadol (יוחנן כהן גדול), "John the High Priest". (Note: Mishnah (Ma'aser Sheni 5:15); ibid. Sotah 9:10, Parah 3:5; Babylonian Talmud (Berakhot 29a, Yoma 9a, Kiddushin 66a, Sotah 33a, Rosh Hashannah 18b); Jerusalem Talmud (Ma'aser Sheni 5:5); Pirke Avot 2:4) John combined political and religious authority and secured Judea's independence from Seleucid control. His reign consolidated the Hasmonean state, expanded its territorial boundaries, and incorporated neighboring populations, laying the foundation for the policies and territorial expansions of subsequent Hasmonean rulers.

Hyrcanus assumed power following the assassination of his father, Simon Thassi, a brother of Judas Maccabeus, by Ptolemy ben Abubus near Jericho. He escaped the attack that killed his father and some of his brothers and was accepted as high priest in Jerusalem. Initially, he maintained relations with the Seleucid Empire, paying tribute while preserving autonomy and participating in military campaigns under Antiochus VII Sidetes, including operations against the Parthians. However, after Antiochus VII's death in 129 BCE, Hyrcanus ceased tribute payments and acted independently, establishing the de facto sovereignty of Judea.

During his reign, Hyrcanus conducted military campaigns to expand Hasmonean territory, which until then was largely confined to central Judea. He captured the regions of Samaria and Idumaea, destroyed the Samaritan temple at Mount Gerizim, and incorporated the Idumaean population, requiring conversion to Judaism. He also extended Hasmonean control over parts of Transjordan and Galilee. Hyrcanus is the first attested Hasmonean ruler to employ foreign troops, and he may have founded Hyrcania, a fortress in the Judaean Desert that bears his name.

Hyrcanus's policies and territorial expansions laid the foundation for the subsequent reigns of his sons, Aristobulus I and Alexander Jannaeus, who assumed the title of king alongside that of high priest.

== Name ==
Josephus explains in The Jewish War that John was also known as "Hyrcanus" but does not explain the reason behind this name. The only other primary sources—the Books of the Maccabees—never used this name for John. The single occurrence of the name Hyrcanus in 2 Maccabees 3:11 refers to a man to whom some of the money in the Temple belonged during the c. 178 BCE visit of Heliodorus.

The reason for the name is disputed amongst biblical scholars, with a variety of reasons proposed:

- Familial origin in the region of Hyrcania on the Caspian Sea
- A Greek regnal name, which would have represented closer ties with the Hellenistic culture against which the Maccabees had revolted under Seleucid rule. However, the region of Hyrcania had been conquered by Mithridates I of Parthia in 141–139 BCE
- Given the name by the Seleucids after he fought in the region alongside Antiochus VII Sidetes against Phraates II of Parthia in 130–129 BCE, a campaign which resulted in the release of Antiochus's brother Demetrius II Nicator from captivity in Hyrcania

== Life and work ==
He was the son of Simon Thassi and hence the nephew of Judas Maccabeus, Jonathan Apphus and their siblings, whose story is told in the deuterocanonical books of 1 Maccabees and 2 Maccabees, in the Talmud, and in Josephus. His mother's name remains unknown. John was not present at a banquet at which his father and his two brothers were murdered by John's brother-in-law, Ptolemy son of Abubus. He attained his father's former offices of High Priest and ethnarch, but not king. Josephus said that John Hyrcanus had five sons but he named only four in his histories: Judah Aristobulus I, Antigonus I, Alexander Jannai, and Absalom. It is the fifth brother who is said to have unsuccessfully sought the throne at the death of Aristobulus I according to Antiquities of the Jews 13.12.1.

== Siege of Jerusalem ==
During the first year of John Hyrcanus's reign, he faced a serious challenge to Judean independence from the Seleucid Empire. Antiochus VII Sidetes marched into Judea, pillaged the countryside, and laid what became a year-long siege of Jerusalem. The prolonged siege caused Hyrcanus to remove any Judean from the city who could not assist with the defence effort (Antiquities 13.240). These refugees were not allowed to pass through Antiochus's lines, becoming trapped in the middle of a chaotic siege. Facing a humanitarian crisis, Hyrcanus re-admitted his estranged Jerusalemites when the festival of Sukkot arrived. Then, as food shortages in Jerusalem became severe, Hyrcanus negotiated a truce with Antiochus.

The terms of the truce required payment of 3,000 talents of silver to Antiochus, the dismantling of the walls of Jerusalem, Judean participation in the Seleucid war against the Parthians, and renewed Judean recognition of Seleucid control (Antiquities 13.245). These terms were a harsh blow to Hyrcanus, who had to loot the tomb of David to pay the 3,000 talents (The Wars of the Jews I 2:5).

== Under Seleucid control (133–128 BCE) ==
Following the Seleucid siege, Judea faced tough economic times which were magnified by taxes to the Seleucids enforced by Antiochus. Furthermore, Hyrcanus was forced to accompany Antiochus on his eastern campaign in 130 BCE. Hyrcanus probably functioned as the military commander of a Jewish company in the campaign. It is reported that Antiochus, out of consideration for the religion of his Jewish allies, at one point ordered a two days' halt of the entire army to allow them to avoid breaking the Sabbath and the festival of Shavuot.

This enforced absence probably caused a loss of support for the inexperienced Hyrcanus among the Judean population. Judeans in the countryside were especially disillusioned with Hyrcanus after Antiochus's army plundered their land. John Hyrcanus's expulsion of the non-military population of Jerusalem during the siege had probably caused resentment, and his looting of the Tomb of David violated his obligations as High Priest, which would have offended the religious leadership.

Therefore, at an early point in his 31-year reign, Hyrcanus had lost support from Judeans in various cultural sectors. The Jerusalemites, the rural Judeans, and the religious leadership probably doubted the future of Judea under Hyrcanus. However in 128 BCE Antiochus VII was killed in battle against Parthia. What followed was an era of conquest led by Hyrcanus that marked the high point of Judea as the most significant power in the Levant.

== Conquests ==
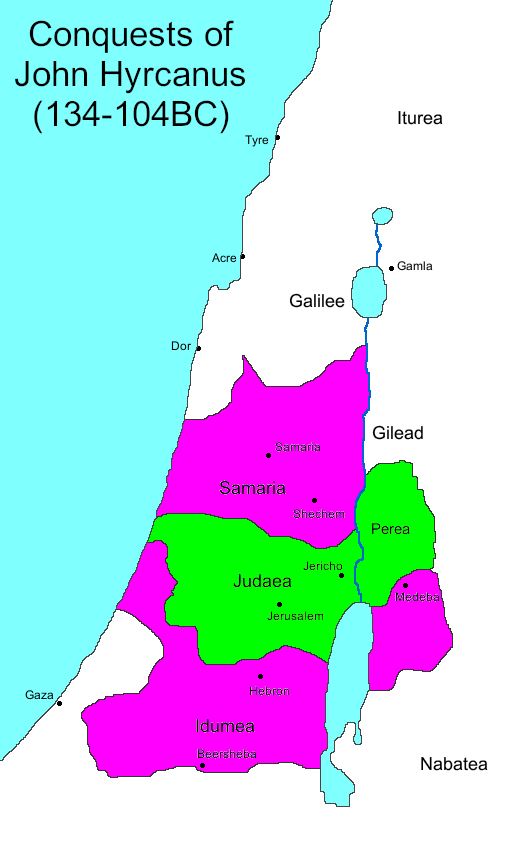
Hasmonean Kingdom under John Hyrcanus situation in 134 BCE area conquered

John Hyrcanus took advantage of unrest in the Seleucid Empire to reassert Judean independence and acquire new territories. In 130 BCE Demetrius II, the former Seleucid king, returned from exile in Hyrcania to resume the government of his empire. However the transition of power made it difficult for Demetrius to reassert control over Judea., and the Seleucid Empire also lost control of other principalities. The Ituraeans of Lebanon, the Ammonites of the Transjordan, and the Arabian Nabateans were among these. Hyrcanus determined to take advantage of the dissipation of the Seleucid Empire to enlarge the Judean State.

Hyrcanus raised a new mercenary army that differed from the Judean forces that had been defeated by Antiochus VII (Ant.13.249). The Judean population was probably still recovering from the attack of Antiochus, and therefore could not provide enough able men for a new army. The new army was funded with more treasure that Hyrcanus removed from the Tomb of David.

Beginning in 113 BCE, Hyrcanus began an extensive military campaign against Samaria. Hyrcanus placed his sons Antigonus and Aristobulus in charge of the siege of Samaria. The Samaritans called for help and eventually received 6,000 troops from Antiochus IX Cyzicenus. Although the siege lasted for a long, difficult year, Hyrcanus did not give up. Ultimately Samaria was overrun and devastated. Cyzicenus's mercenary army was defeated and the city of Scythopolis seems to have been occupied by Hyrcanus as well. The inhabitants of Samaria were enslaved. Upon conquering former Seleucid regions Hyrcanus implemented a policy of compelling the non-Jewish populations to adopt Jewish customs.

John Hyrcanus's first conquest was an invasion of the Transjordan in 110 BCE. John Hyrcanus's mercenary army laid siege to the city of Medeba and took it after a six-month siege. After these victories, Hyrcanus went north towards Shechem and Mount Gerizim. The city of Shechem was reduced to a village and the Samaritan Temple on Mount Gerizim was destroyed. This military action against Shechem has been dated archaeologically around 111–110 BCE. Destroying the Samaritan Temple on Mount Gerizim helped ameliorate John Hyrcanus's standing among religious elite and common Jews who detested any temple to God outside of Jerusalem.

Hyrcanus also initiated a military campaign against the Idumeans (Edomites). During this campaign Hyrcanus conquered Adora, Maresha and other Idumean towns (Ant.13.257). Hyrcanus then instituted forced conversions of the Idumeans to Judaism. This was an unprecedented measure for a Judean ruler; it was the first instance of forced conversion perpetrated by Jews in recorded history. However, some scholars dispute the narrative of forced conversion and believe that the Edomites peacefully assimilated in Judean society.

== Economy, foreign relations, and religion ==
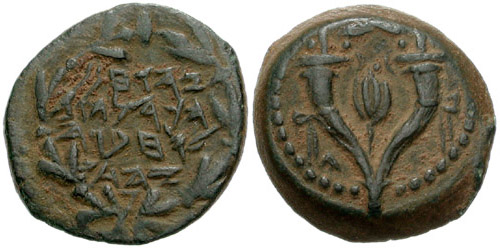
Judea, Hasmoneans. John Hyrcanus I (Yehohanan). 134–104 BCE. Æ Prutah (13mm, 2.02 gm, 12h). "Yehohanan the High Priest and the Council of the Jews" (in Hebrew) in five lines within wreath / Double cornucopia adorned with ribbons; pomegranate between horns; small A to lower left. Meshorer Group B, 11; Hendin 457.

After the siege of Jerusalem, Hyrcanus faced a serious economic crisis in Judea, although the economic difficulties probably subsided after the death of Antiochus VII, since Hyrcanus no longer had to pay taxes or tributes to a weaker Seleucid Empire. The economic situation eventually improved enough for Hyrcanus to issue his own coinage (see below). On top of that, Hyrcanus initiated vital building projects in Judea. Hyrcanus re-built the walls destroyed by Antiochus. He also built a fortress north of the Temple called the Baris and possibly also the fortress Hyrcania.

Moreover, out of desperation, Hyrcanus sought for good relations with the surrounding Gentile powers, especially the growing Roman Republic. Two decrees were passed in the Roman Senate that established a treaty of friendship with Judea. Although it is difficult to specifically date these resolutions, they represent efforts made between Hyrcanus and Rome to maintain stable relations. Also, an embassy sent by Hyrcanus received Roman confirmation of Hasmonean independence. Hyrcanus was an excellent case of a ruler backed by Roman support.

In addition to Rome, Hyrcanus was able to maintain steady relations with Ptolemaic Egypt. This was probably made possible due to various Jews living in Egypt who had connections with the Ptolemaic Court (Ant. 13.284–287). Finally, the cities of Athens and Pergamon even showed honor to Hyrcanus in an effort to appease Rome.

Furthermore, the minting of coins by Hyrcanus demonstrates John Hyrcanus's willingness to delegate power. Sixty-three coins found near Bethlehem bear the inscription, "Yohanan the High Priest." The reserve side of the coins contains the phrase, "The Assembly of the Jews." This seems to suggest that during his reign, Hyrcanus was not an absolute ruler. Instead, Hyrcanus had to submit at times to an assembly of Jews that had a certain amount of minority power. The coins lack any depictions of animals or humans. This suggests that Hyrcanus strictly followed the Jewish prohibition against graven images. The coins also seem to suggest that Hyrcanus considered himself to be primarily the High Priest of Judea, and his rule of Judea was shared with the Assembly.

In Judea, religious issues were a core aspect of domestic policy. Josephus only reports one specific conflict between Hyrcanus and the Pharisees, who asked him to relinquish the position of High Priest (Ant. 13.288–296). After this falling-out, Hyrcanus sided with the rivals of the Pharisees, the Sadducees. However, elsewhere Josephus reports that the Pharisees did not grow to power until the reign of Queen Salome Alexandra (JW.1.110) The coins minted under Hyrcanus suggest that Hyrcanus did not have complete secular authority. Furthermore, this account may represent a piece of Pharisaic apologetics due to Josephus's Pharisaic background. Regardless, there were probably tensions because of the religious and secular leadership roles held by Hyrcanus.

Ultimately, one of the final acts of John Hyrcanus's life was an act that solved any kind of dispute over his role as High Priest and ethnarch. In the will of Hyrcanus, he provisioned for the division of the high priesthood from secular authority. John Hyrcanus's widow was given control of civil authority after his death, and his son Judas Aristobulus was given the role of High Priest. This action represented John Hyrcanus's willingness to compromise over the issue of secular and religious authority. (However, Aristobulus was not satisfied with this arrangement, so he cast his mother into prison and let her starve.)

The Tomb of Hyrcanus was, according to Josephus, located near the Towers' Pool (also known as Hezekiah's Pool) northwest of the present Jaffa Gate. During the Roman siege of Jerusalem in 70 CE, Titus selected the area opposite the tomb to begin his assault on the city's third wall.

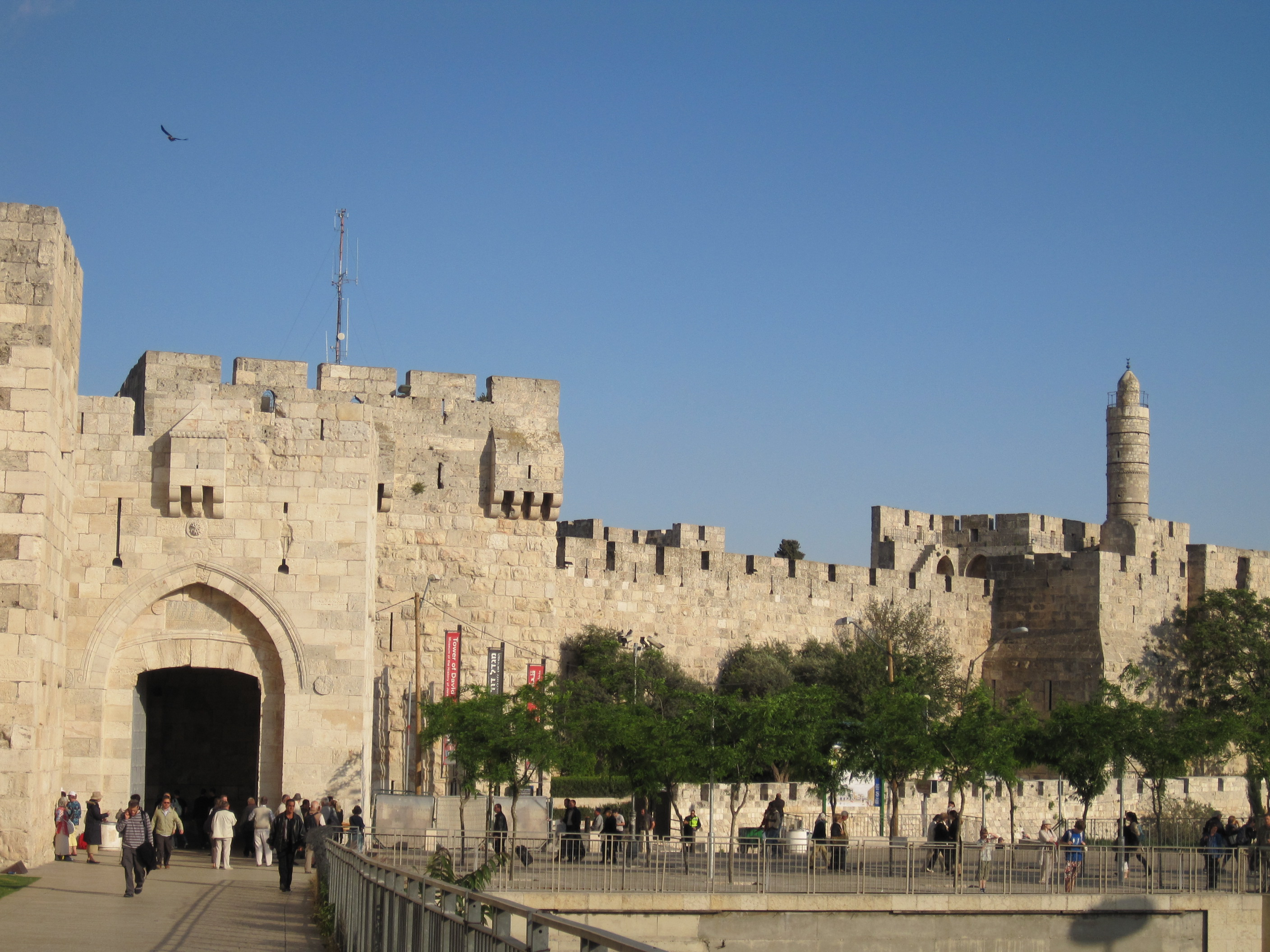
View of Jaffa Gate (left) and the Tower of David (right).

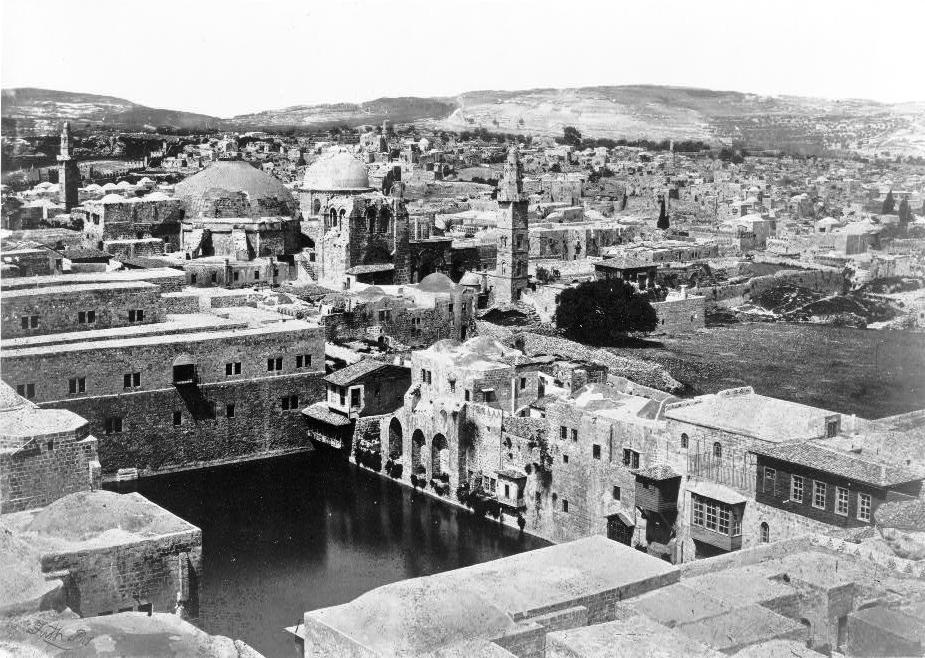
Hezekiah's Pool (1862); in the background is the double-domed Church of the Holy Sepulchre

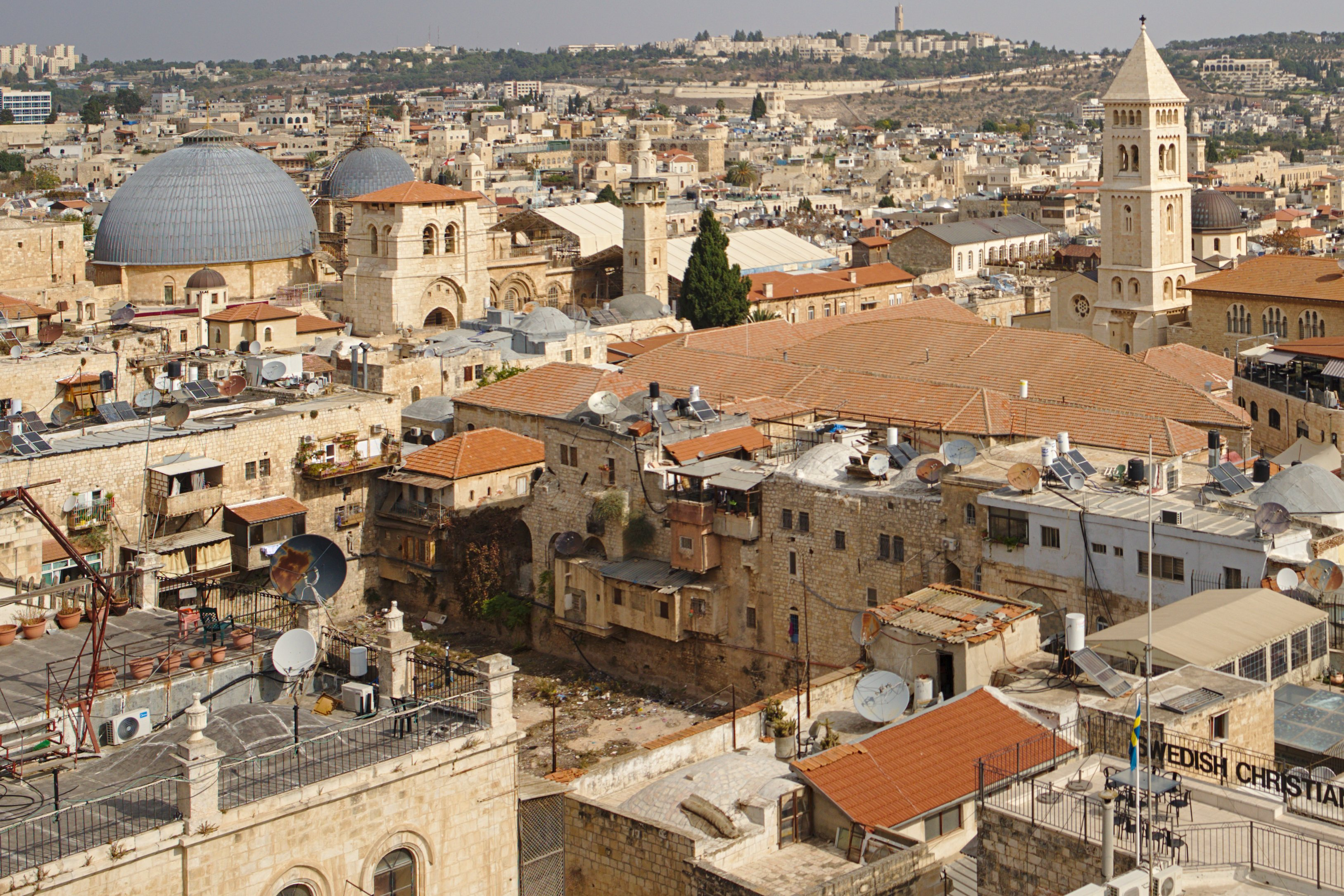
Hezekiah's Pool in November 2019, totally dry

== Legacy ==
John Hyrcanus the High Priest is remembered in rabbinic literature as having made several outstanding enactments and deeds worthy of memorial, one of which being that he cancelled the requirement of saying the avowal mentioned in Deuteronomy 26:12–15 once in every three years, since he saw that in Israel they had ceased to separate the First Tithe in its proper manner and which, by making the avowal, and saying "I have hearkened to the voice of the Lord my God, and have done according to all that you have commanded me," he makes himself dishonest before his Maker and liable to God's wrath. In his days, the First Tithe, which was meant to be given unto the Levites, was given instead to the priests of Aaron's lineage, after Ezra had fined the Levites for not returning in full force to the Land of Israel. By not being able to give the First Tithe unto the Levites, as originally commanded by God, this made the avowal null and void. In addition, John Hyrcanus is remembered for having cancelled the reading of Psalm 44:23, formerly chanted daily by the Levites in the Temple precincts, and which words, "Awake! Why do you sleep, O Lord?, etc.", seemed inappropriate, as if they were imposing their own will over God's, or that God was actually sleeping. In similar fashion, the High Priest cancelled an ill-practice had by the people to cause bleeding near the eyes of sacrificial calves by beating their heads so as to stun them, prior to their being bound and slaughtered, since by beating the animal in such a way they ran the risk of causing a blemish in the animal's membrane lining its brain. To prevent this from happening, the High Priest made rings in the ground of the Temple court for helping to secure the animals before slaughter.

Before John Hyrcanus officiated as Israel's High Priest, the people had it as a practice to do manual work on the intermediate days of the Jewish holidays, and one could hear in Jerusalem the hammer pounding against the anvil. The High Priest passed an edict restricting such labours on those days, thinking it inappropriate to do servile work on the Hol ha-Moed, until after the Feast (Yom Tov). It had also been a custom in Israel, since the days that the Hasmoneans defeated the Grecians who prevented them from mentioning the name of God in heaven, to inscribe the name of God in their ordinary contracts, bills of sale and promissory notes. They would write, for example, "In the year such and such of Yohanan, the High Priest of the Most High God." But when the Sages of Israel became sensible of the fact that such ordinary contracts were often discarded in the rubbish after reimbursement, it was deemed improper to show disrespect to God's name by doing so. Therefore, on the 3rd day of the lunar month Tishri, the practice of writing God's name in ordinary contracts was cancelled altogether, while the date of such cancellation was declared a day of rejoicing, and inscribed in the Scroll of Fasting.

The Mishnah (Parah 3:4[5]) also relates that during the tenure of John Hyrcanus as High Priesthood, he had prepared the ashes of two Red heifers used in purifying those who had contracted corpse uncleanness.

In what is seen as yet another one of John Hyrcanus's accomplishments, during his days any commoner or rustic could be trusted in what concerns Demai-produce (that is, if a doubt arose over whether or not such produce bought from him had been correctly divested of its tithes), since even the common folk in Israel were careful to separate the Terumah-offering given to the priests. Still, such produce required its buyer to separate the First and Second Tithes. Some view this as also being a discredit unto the High Priest, seeing that the commoners refused to separate these latter tithes because of being intimidated by bullies, who took these tithes from the public treasuries by force, while John Hyrcanus refused to censure such bad conduct.

In the later years of his life, John Hyrcanus abandoned the sect of the Pharisees and joined the Sadducees. This prompted the famous rabbinic dictum: "Do not believe in yourself until your dying day." According to Rabbanic Literature Yochanan's soul was not able to enter the World to Come due to his late-life heresy, despite his many merits.The soul was reincarnated as Elazar ben Dordia to provide it with a new opportunity for atonement. The story of Rabbi Elazar ben Dordia is recorded in the Talmud (Avodah Zarah 17a), which describes his life as a man deeply steeped in promiscuity. After pursuing a prostitute across seven rivers, she told him he would never be forgiven. Shaken by her words, he began an intense process of repentance, pleading with the mountains, hills, sun, moon, and stars to intercede for him, but they all replied that they were only capable of praying for themselves. Realizing that "the matter depends on me alone," he put his head between his knees and wept bitterly until his soul departed. A heavenly voice then declared that he was worthy of the World to Come. Through Elazar ben Dordia's complete and sincere repentance—taking full responsibility for his actions in a single, intense moment—the soul was finally able to achieve its rectification and attain eternal life. This teaches that even the greatest spiritual leaders are not immune to failure, but that a sinner can achieve complete repentance and salvation, regardless of their past. At his death, a monument (Hebrew: נפשיה דיוחנן כהן גדול) was built in his honour and where his bones were interred. The monument was located in what was outside the walls of the city at that time, but by Josephus's time was between the second (Note: This wall, according to Josephus, only encompassed the northern quarter of the city (Josephus, Wars v.iv.2)) and third (Note: According to Josephus, the person to begin the building of this wall was Agrippa I (Josephus, Wars v.iv.2)) walls of Jerusalem, and where the Romans had built a bank of earthworks to break into the newer third wall encompassing the upper city, directly opposite John's monument.

== See also ==
- Hasmonean coinage
- Hyrcanus II
- Hyrcanus inscription
- List of Hasmonean and Herodian rulers

== Notes ==
John Hyrcanus Hasmonean Dynasty Died: 104 BCE
Jewish titles
Preceded by Simon Thassi	Prince of Judaea; 134–104 BCE	Succeeded by Aristobulus I
Preceded by Simon Thassi	High Priest of Judaea; 134–104 BCE	Succeeded by Aristobulus I
