= Gerah =

Ancient Hebrew unit of weight and currency

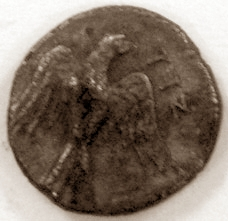
Obverse of a Judean silver Yehud coin from the Persian era (.58 gram), with falcon or eagle and Paleo Hebrew inscription "יהד" "Yehud" (Judaea). Denomination is a ma'ah

A gerah (Hebrew: גרה, romanized: gêrāh) is an ancient Hebrew unit of weight and currency, which, according to the Torah (Exodus 30:13, Leviticus 27:25, Numbers 3:47, 18:16), was equivalent to 1/20 of a standard "sacred" shekel.

A gerah is known in Aramaic, and usually in Rabbinic literature, as a ma'ah (מעה; Mishnah Hebrew pl. ma'ot "מעות" which means "coins"). It was originally a fifth of a denarius or zuz, as seen in the Torah and in Ezekiel (45:12), then became a sixth of a dinar/zuz, such as the coinage of Persian-era Yehud, which came in two denominations: approximately 0.58 gram for the ma'ah and approximately .29 gram for the half ma'ah (chatzi ma'ah). .58 × 6 = 3.48 grams, which is about the weight of a zuz/denarius based on a 14 gram shekel.

The Mishnah (1:1) and Jerusalem Talmud (1:4) in Shekalim discuss whether the kalbon (agio) which was sometimes required to be added to the half shekel annually levied for the Temple, was a "ma'ah" or a "chatzi ma'ah" (half ma'ah).

== See also ==
- Biblical and Talmudic units of measurement
- List of historical currencies
- Yehud coinage
- Zuz
- Shekel
