= Procuratorial coinage of Roman Judaea =

The procuratorial coinage of Roman Judaea was minted by the prefects and procurators of the province between AD 6 and 66 in only one denomination and size, the bronze prutah. All the coins were minted in Jerusalem.

The design of these coins reflects accommodation of Jewish religious sensibilities. Likely in collaboration with Jerusalem's Jewish leadership, they deviated from typical Roman coinage featuring the emperor's portrait. Instead, they displayed symbols like palm tree and ears of grains, reminiscent of earlier Hasmonean and Herodian designs. A notable exception is the coinage of Pontius Pilate, which included Roman cultic items on one side, though the reverse maintained Jewish imagery.

Primarily circulated in Judaea, these coins have been found beyond their intended area, including in Transjordan and Syria. Minting ceased in 59 CE, but the coins remained in use until the end of the First Jewish–Roman War 70 CE.

== Issues ==
Attribution to specific governors is achieved through cross-referencing the coins' regnal year of the reigning emperor (Greek inscription) with historical records, particularly the writings of Josephus, to establish a governor's chronology.

Not all of the Procurators issued coinage. Those that did were Coponius, Marcus Ambivulus, Valerius Gratus, Pontius Pilate, Antonius Felix and Porcius Festus, who between them issued a total of 19 different coins. The last three Procurators Lucceius Albinus, Gessius Florus and Marcus Antonius Julianus didn't issue any coins as the tidings of the First Jewish-Roman War was in the air and the leaders of the revolt started issuing their own coins.

=== Coponius ===
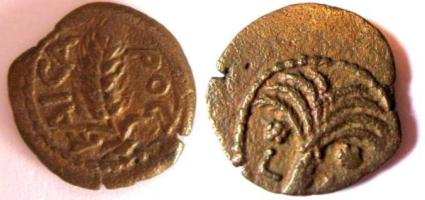
Coin of Coponius

Coponius was the first Roman Prefect of Judaea, being appointed in 6 AD when Herod Archelaus, the son of Herod the Great, was deposed and banished to Gaul by Augustus. Coponius depicted the palm tree bearing two bunches of dates on his coinage, which previously had appeared only on extremely rare coins of Herod Antipas. The palm tree design was later used to represent Judaea on coins issued by the Jews during the First and Second Revolts, as well as later Roman-issued Judaean-related pieces.

The obverse of Coponius's coins show an ear of barley. The representation of palm trees and barley was done out of sensitivity to Jewish belief not to depict a living creature, and especially not a human being, on their coinage; hence, there is no portrait of the Emperor Augustus on these coins. However, the inscriptions on the coins clearly proclaim that Judaea was occupied by Imperial Rome; hence, the Greek letters surrounding the barley read: [K]aisa-ros ["of Caesar"] with the date, also in Greek letters, under the palm.

=== Marcus Ambivulus ===
Marcus Ambivulus was the Prefect of Judaea from 9 - 12 AD. He issued a coin for each of the three years of his rule. Like those issued by Coponius, the coins of Ambivulus depicted a palm tree bearing two bunches of dates and an ear of barley.

=== Valerius Gratus ===
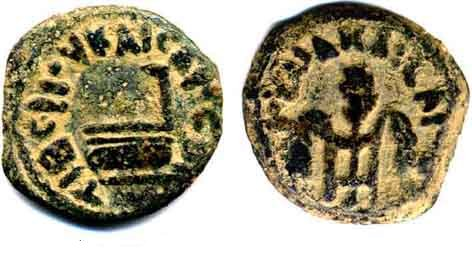
Coin of Pontius Pilate from 29 AD depicting a Roman simpulum and ears of barley

Valerius Gratus was Prefect of Judaea under the Emperor Tiberius. Gratus issued several different types of coins in as many years. The symbols represented on his coins included palm branches, lilies, cornucopia, grape leaves and amphorae. His coins showed Caesar's title within a wreath, and the Emperor's name 'TIB' or his mother, Julia (IOYLIA), and the year of his reign above two cornucopiae.

=== Pontius Pilate ===
The bronze coins (or 'prutah') issued by Pontius Pilate between 26 and 36 AD are of especial interest to Christians and Jews because of his connection with Jesus Christ and his involvement in Jewish history. The evidence of his coinage and the Pilate inscription found at Caesarea seems to reveal that Pontius Pilate as Prefect was determined to promote a form of the Roman religion in Judaea regardless of whether this was offensive to the Jews. Unlike those of his predecessors, the coinage issued by Pilate depicts Roman symbolism connected with the imperial cult such as the simpulum and lituus. However, it has been argued that if Pilate was deliberately trying to offend the Jews he would have put the head of the Emperor on the obverse of his coinage. Instead, he depicted three ears of barley. A third type showed crossed palm branches and a wreathed inscription.

The lituus was the wand of an augur, and was used to interpret natural phenomenon such as lightning flashes, the flight of birds, etc. The simpulum was a ladle used to make libations during sacrifices and was a common symbol of the Roman priesthood. These symbols were guaranteed to offend Jewish religious sensibilities being placed on coinage that they would have to handle on a daily basis.

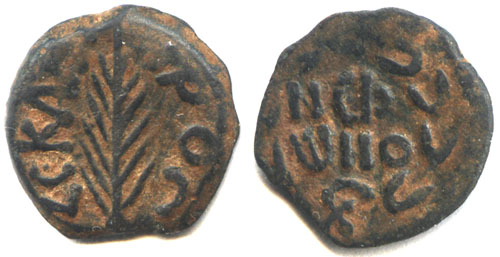
Coin of Antonius Felix

According to the Caesarea inscription, Pilate dedicated a Tiberieum to the deified Augustus. Philo wrote that Pilate was "...inflexible, merciless and obstinate...(and did not) wish to do anything that would please his subjects." Josephus stated that Pilate set up shields, also associated with the Roman imperial cult, in honour of Tiberius in the Jewish Temple in Jerusalem, which also caused great offence to the Jews, who protested until they were removed.

=== Antonius Felix ===
Felix was Procurator of Judaea under Claudius. His coins bear the names of Claudius, Julia Agrippina, Nero (as 'Caesar'), and Britannicus.

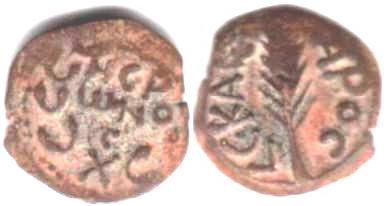
Coin of Porcius Festus

=== Porcius Festus ===
Procurator under Nero, only one known coin type was issued by Festus, the obverse of which features a palm branch and the Greek legend KAICAPOC (Caesar), and the reverse NEPWNOC (Nero) in a wreath.

== Circulation ==
Primarily circulated within Judaea, with the highest concentration found in Jerusalem, these coins offer evidence of some circulation beyond their intended area. Discoveries have been made on both sides of the Jordan River and even in distant locations like Dura and Antioch.

Minting ceased in 59 CE, though the coins remained in circulation until the conclusion of the First Jewish–Roman War (70 CE). The war's devastation and the destruction of Jerusalem and the Temple in 70 CE led to a significant shift in Roman administration, with subsequent coinage lacking Jewish influence.

== See also ==
- Historical currencies in Judaea
  - Ma'ah, Aramaic for gerah, ancient Hebrew unit of weight and currency
  - Prutah
  - Shekel, ancient Near Eastern unit of weight and coin
  - Zuz, ancient Jewish name for certain silver coinage
- Judaean and Judaea-related coinage
  - Yehud coinage
  - Hasmonean coinage
  - Herodian coinage
  - First Jewish Revolt coinage
  - Judaea Capta coinage
  - Bar Kokhba Revolt coinage
- List of historical currencies
