= Annius Rufus =

Roman Prefect of Judea from AD 12 to 15

Annius Rufus was a Roman administrator who served as the 3rd prefect of Judaea from c. 12–15 CE. Little is known of him and the only source for him is the historian Josephus. It is unknown if he minted coinage due to disputes over how the prefects of Judaea numbered the regnal years of Augustus.

== Sources ==
The 1st century CE Jewish historian Josephus is the only source for Annius Rufus. Little historical research can be done on Rufus due to how common his name was; Rufus, Latin for reddish, was a common name among freemen of the Roman Empire. Guy MacLean Rogers argued that the lack of knowledge regarding Rufus, especially compared to other prefects of Judeau, shows that his tenure was unmarked by scandals or outbreaks of violence.

== Career ==
The ethnarch kingdom of Herod Archelaus was turned into a Roman province in 6 CE. Rufus was the third person to serve as prefect of Judaea and was in charge when Augustus died; his tenure as prefect is believed to have occurred from c. 12–15 CE. Valerius Gratus was appointed by Tiberius to replace Rufus.

Rufus might have issued his own coinage, but the dating of coins attested to him is disputed due to how the prefect Coponius dated the regnal years of Augustus relative to his coins as either starting at the Battle of Actium in 31 BCE or Augustus' accession in 27 BCE. These might have been minted before his time as prefect by other prefects like Marcus Ambivulus.

An expedition conducted by Harvard University to Samaria in 1909 dated buildings in Sebaste using Roman and Herodian coinage and the inscription of Rufus.

== See also ==
- Gens Annia
- Roman administration of Judaea (AD 6–135)

== Works cited ==
=== Books ===
- Mason, Steve (2008). Flavius Josephus: Translation and Commentary. Vol. 1B. Brill Publishers. ISBN 9789004169340.
- Numhauser, Alexander (2021). Hispanojewish Archaeology: The Jews of Hispania in Late Antiquity and the Early Middle Ages through Their Material Remains. Brill Publishers. ISBN 9789004419919.
- Rogers, Guy (2021). For the Freedom of Zion: The Great Revolt of Jews against Romans, 66–74 CE. Yale University Press. ISBN 9780300248135.

=== Journals ===
- Bond, Helen (1996). "The Coins of Pontius Pilate: Part of an Attempt to Provoke the People or to Integrate them into the Empire?". Journal for the Study of Judaism in the Persian, Hellenistic, and Roman Period. 27 (3). Brill Publishers: 241–262. doi:10.2307/24660068. JSTOR 24660068.
- Reisner, George (1910). "The Harvard Expedition to Samaria Excavations of 1909". Harvard Theological Review. 3 (2). Cambridge University Press: 248–263. doi:10.2307/1507307. JSTOR 1507307.
- Syme, Ronald (1986). "Three Ambivii". The Classical Quarterly. 36 (1). Cambridge University Press: 271–276. doi:10.2307/638969. JSTOR 638969.

Annius Rufus Roman Rulers of Judea
Preceded by Marcus Ambivulus	Prefect of Judaea	Succeeded by Valerius Gratus
