= Roman administration of Judaea (AD 6–135) =

The administration of Judaea as a province of Rome from 6 to 135 was carried out primarily by a series of Roman prefects, procurators, and legates pro praetore. The first of these administrators coincided or were intertwined with the ostensible rule by the Herodian tetrarchy. The Roman administrators were as follows:

Name	Dates of administration	Number of years	Title
Coponius	6–9	3	Praefectus
Marcus Ambivulus	9–12	3	Praefectus
Annius Rufus	12–15	3	Praefectus
Valerius Gratus	15–26	11	Praefectus
Pontius Pilatus	26–36	10	Praefectus
Marcellus	36–37	1	Praefectus
Marullus	37–41	4	Praefectus
Vacant	41–44	3	Monarchy restored
Cuspius Fadus	44–46	2	Procurator
Tiberius Julius Alexander	46–48	2	Procurator
Ventidius Cumanus	48–52	4	Procurator
Marcus Antonius Felix	52–60	8	Procurator
Porcius Festus	60–62	2	Procurator
Lucceius Albinus	62–64	2	Procurator
Gessius Florus	64–66	2	Procurator
Marcus Antonius Julianus	c. 66–c. 70	4	Procurator
Sextus Vettulenus Cerialis	70–71	1	Legatus
Sextus Lucilius Bassus	71–72	1	Legatus
Lucius Flavius Silva Nonius Bassus	72–81	9	Legatus
Marcus Salvidienus	80–85	5	Legatus
Gnaeus Pinarius Aemilius Cicatricula Pompeius Longinus	85–89	1	Legatus
Sextus Hermentidius Campanus	93–97	1	Legatus
Gaius Julius Quadratus Bassus	102–104	2	Legatus
Quintus Pompeius Falco	105–107	2	Legatus
Tiberianus	114–117	3	Legatus
Lusius Quietus	117–118	1	Legatus
Lucius Cossonius Gallus	c. 120	?	Legatus
Quintus Coredius Gallus Gargilius Antiquus	c. 124–125 or 122–125	1 (3)	Legatus
Quintus Tineius Rufus	c. 130–c. 132	2	Legatus
Sextus Julius Severus	133–136(137?)	3 (4)	Legatus

"Hadrian stationed an extra legion in Judaea, renaming it Syria Palaestina." This was following the defeat of the Bar Kokhba Revolt in 135. The Syria-based legion, Legio III Gallica, took part in the quelling of the revolt from 132 to 136, and in the aftermath, the emperor Hadrian renamed the province of Judea and its extra legion Syria Palaestina. The province of Syria Palaestina was divided into Palaestina Prima and Palaestina Salutaris in about 357, and by 409 Palaestina Prima had been further split into a smaller Palaestina Prima and Palaestina Secunda, while Salutaris was named Tertia or Salutaris. Palæstina Prima or Palaestina I existed from the late 4th century until it was temporarily lost to the Sassanid Empire (Persian Empire) in 614, but re-conquered in 628 and finally until the Muslim conquest of the Levant in the 630s.

== See also ==
- Kings of Israel
- Kings of Judah
- Herodian Dynasty
- List of High Priests of Israel
- Syria Palaestina
- Promagistrate

== Sources ==
- Adkins, Lesley; Adkins, Roy A. (1998). Handbook to Life in Ancient Rome. Oup USA. ISBN 978-0-19-512332-6.
- Lewis, Bernard (April 15, 2011). Islam in History: Ideas, People, and Events in the Middle East. Open Court. ISBN 978-0-8126-9757-5.
- Shahin, Mariam (2005). Palestine: A Guide. Interlink Books. ISBN 1-56656-557-X.
- "Palestine - Roman Palestine". Encyclopedia Britannica.
