= Tel Michal =

Archaeological site in Israel

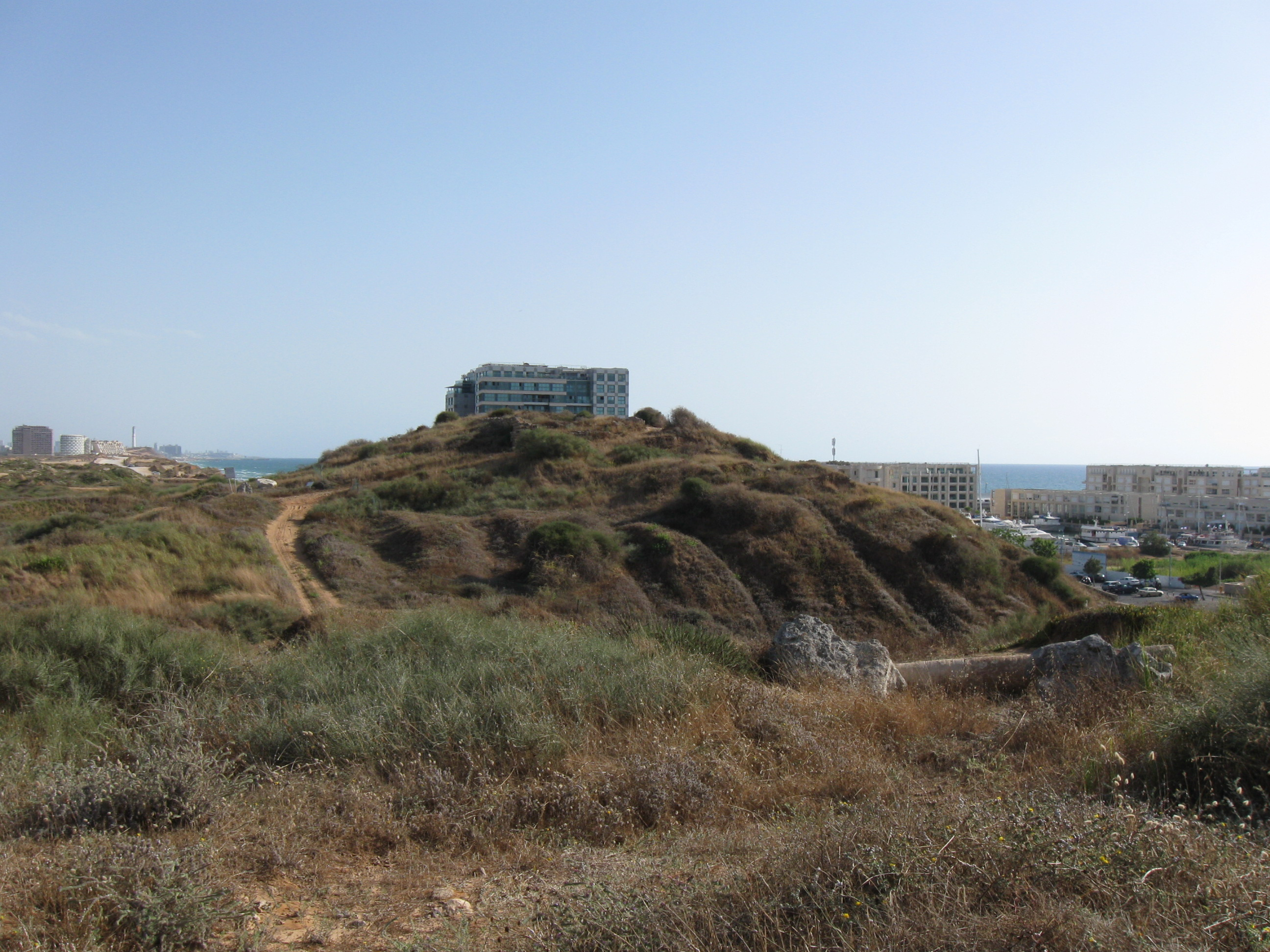
- High mound of Tel Michal

- Location within Israel
- 32.159167°N 34.797778°E
- Periods: Bronze Age, Iron Age, Persian, Hellenistic, Roman, Early Arab
- Location: Israel

Site notes
- Material: Stone
- Excavation dates: 1958-1960, 1977–1980
- Archaeologists: Nahman Avigad, Ze'ev Herzog
- Condition: abandoned
- Public access: yes

Tel Michal is an archaeological site on Israel's central Mediterranean coast, near the modern city of Herzliya, about 6.5 kilometres (4.0 mi) north of the Yarkon River estuary and 4 kilometres (2.5 mi) south of Arsuf-Appolonia. Excavations have yielded remains from the Middle Bronze Age to the Early Arab period.

== Description ==
The archaeological site of Tel Michal covers five hills on the ridge running along the coast, which are composed of lithified wind-blown sediments, an eolianite known locally as kurkar. The highest of these, the actual tell, stands 30 m above sea level and is three-quarters of an acre in size. It is separated from the other hills by two ravines running to the sea on its north and south. To its north stands another hill, 5 meters lower in altitude. This hill is a rectangular plateau, 250 × 175 meters, bordered on its north by the Gelilot Stream. Three hillocks lie to the northeast, east and southeast of the high mound. The northeastern hillock covers an area of some 2000 m^{2}. The two remaining hillocks are smaller and rise to a height of 5 meters.

== History ==
=== Bronze Age ===
Stratum XVII of the excavations of Tel Michal reveals that the site was first settled at the end of the Middle Bronze Age IIB (1800/1750–1550 BCE). The first settlers built a 4-m-high raised platform made of alternating layers of red clay and sand on the tel's high mound. This was supported by a brick retaining wall on the north and a glacis made of sloping layers of sand. Structures were then built on top of the platform, though none were preserved. The site covered approximately one-half to three quarters of an acre at the time, finds from which included local pottery, Cypriot imports, Hyksos scarabs and Egyptian alabaster vessels. It was likely a trading post connected to the Hyksos dynasties that dominated Egypt. This initial settlement was apparently destroyed by tectonic activity.

Settlers who arrived at Tel Michal during the Late Bronze Age I (1550–1400 BCE) expanded the area of the high mound by means of a 10m high, 30m wide earth fill, determining its shape to this day. During this period in the site's habitation, a small fort, commanding the approach from the coast to the ridge, was constructed on the north side of the mound. The strip of sand below the fort would have been an ideal location for traders to anchor or beach their ships. Several dwellings stood south of the fort. Finds from the period include local pottery and Cypriot imports, plus an unusual group of kraters, different from the typical pottery of the period. Possibly the product of the Cannanite or Syrian coast, these were made of coarse material and decorated with horizontal bands or wavy lines in black or black and red, while two displayed horizontal handles.

The Late Bronze Age I settlement at Tel Michal was also destroyed, though less violently than its predecessor. It was resettled during the Late Bronze Age II (1400–1200 BCE). Although the new inhabitants expanded the earlier rampart and added a retaining wall at its base, the site remained largely unchanged until the 14th or early 13th centuries BCE when it was again abandoned, perhaps as the result of a decline in international commerce.

=== Iron Age ===
Tel Michal remained uninhabited until the 10th century BCE, when the high mound and the three hillocks were settled. Strata XIV and XIII display typical Iron Age dwellings, plus a walled, 10m by 10m open-air cultic structure on the northeastern hillock, a room devoted to cult on the eastern one, and two rectangular structures with benches along the walls on the southeastern hillock. The room on the eastern hillock featured a square eolianite base that may have served as an altar or an offering table, while four chalices and additional vessels were recovered nearby. It appears all three hillocks served as family cultic rooms, the biblical bamot, suggesting a Phoenician population. East of the high mound excavators also found two pairs of long wine presses. The site was once again abandoned in the 10th century and resettled and abandoned once more during the 8th.

=== Persian period ===
Tel Michal features six strata (XI-VI) from the Persian period, a testament to the importance of the region to both Phoenician trade and the Persian army. Stratum XI, dated to the late 6th century BCE and early 5th, shows the site was again serving as a way station and trading post. Pottery from the period is characterized by geometric and floral motifs of the East Greek style. On the northern edge of the high mound excavators uncovered a fort, while the rest of the mound features multiple silos, cooking ovens and ash pits. These would suggest that the site was home to a garrison, probably charged with guarding the food stores. Though they would change in character in subsequent phases, structures on the northern edge of the mound would continue to serve as military and administrative headquarters throughout the Persian period.

Houses on the southern mound in stratum X (first half of the 5th century BCE) are the first evidence of a permanent settlement. This settlement reached its zenith towards the end of this century and the next, when it covered an area of 1.5 to 2.5 acres. The site also shows evidence of town planning absent in previous phases. A temple stood on the northern hillock, from which dozens of votive figurines were recovered, while another stood on the eastern hillock. Houses on the northern hill are bordered by an industrial quarter featuring several kilns, while two wine presses stood nearby. By the final phase of the Persian period, the high mound also displays a functional division, with its northern edge occupied by a fort, the center by dwellings, and the southern part mostly empty save for a number of silos.

The northern hill also contained a cemetery, a section from which, covering no more than a tenth of its estimated area, yielded 120 burials. These were found to be of three distinct types, cist burials, pit graves and infant burials in storage jars. Burial offering were also recovered, including bowls, fibulae, bronze bracelets, iron tools and silver rings. Ze'ev Harzog noted the striking resemblance of this assemblage to similar finds from Kamid el-Loz in Lebanon, also dated to the 4th century BCE.

=== Hellenistic period ===
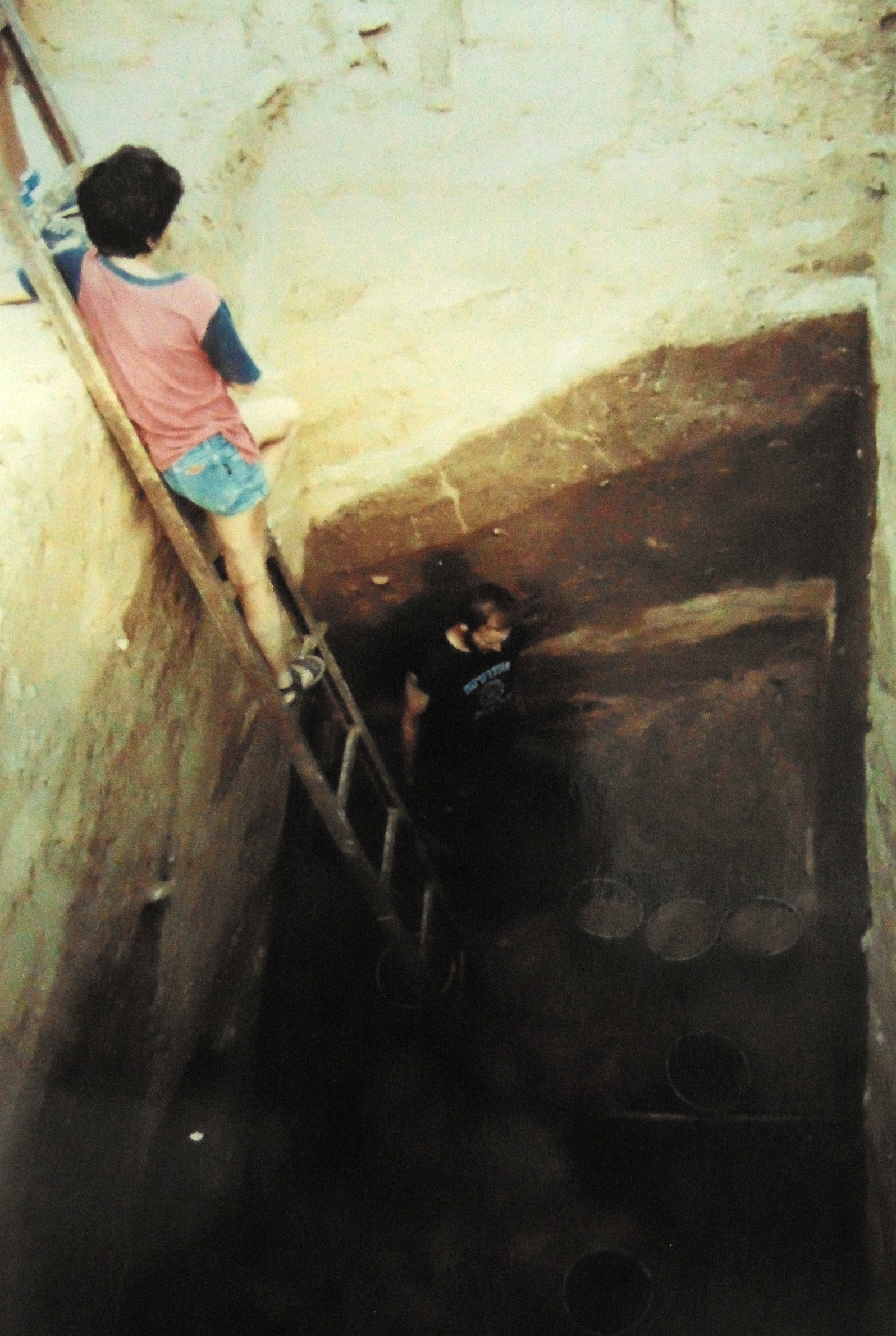
Deep excavation to determine strata and extent of suspected fortification

The settlement at Tel Michal was not destroyed during the region's conquest by Alexander the Great, ushering the Hellenistic period, though it appears to have been abandoned by the end of the 4th century BCE. Settlement was renewed shortly thereafter, but was completely different in character. The high mound was dominated by a large fortress, 20 by 25 meters, with a central courtyard. Nearby, excavations uncovered a number of houses and a kiln. The northern hill was not resettled, housing a large wine press instead. The installation contained two collection vats, the larger of which had a capacity of 7,000 liters, suggesting a communal role. The northeastern hillock continued to serve a cultic purpose, housing a courtyard containing an altar, while the eastern hillock housed a round silo. A hoard of 47 silver tetradrachms found near the silo contains coins from the reigns of Ptolemy I through Ptolemy III, dating stratum V to the third century BCE. Stratum IV, uncovered on the high mound, testifies to habitation during Seleucid rule over the region (second century BCE). Seleucid control of the site probably ended with John Hyrcanus' (r. 134-104 BCE) conquest of Jaffa.

Tel Michal was also occupied during the Hasmonean period. A small fort stood at the center of the high mound, and a small wine press stood 500 meters south of it. Both produced coins from the reign of Alexander Jannaeus. Tel Michal was probably a part of the defensive line of fortifications established by Jannaeus along the Yarkon river, described by Josephus.

=== Roman period ===
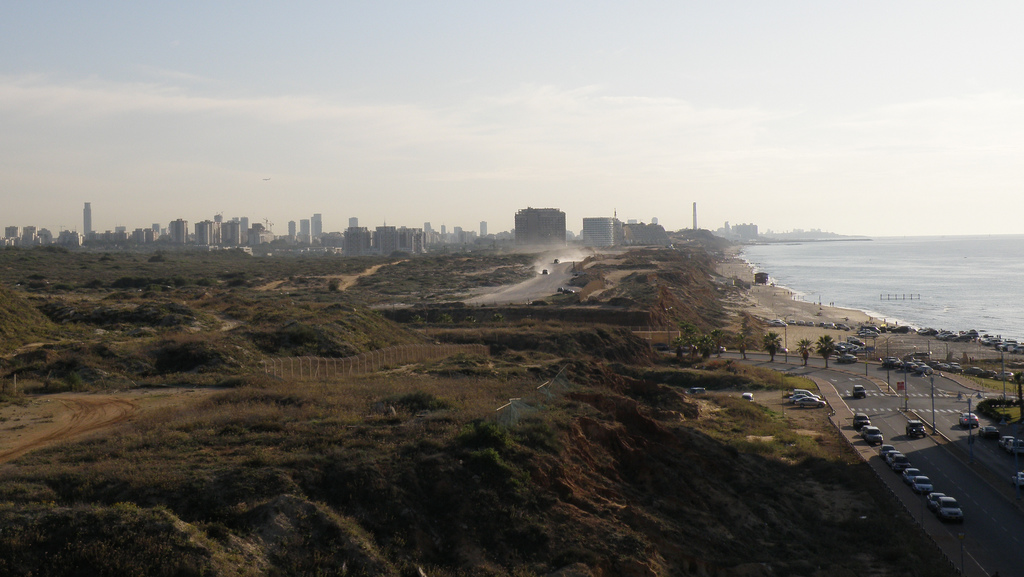
View south from Tel Michal, showing Tel Aviv

A large fortress, 31 by 38 meters, once again stood at the site during the Roman period. Erected on foundations of coarse eolianite, the superstructure was built of dressed eolianite stones laid in headers. The entrance to the fortress stood on its northern side, while in the center of its inner courtyard stood a tower which may have served as a lighthouse at night. Coins recovered at the site come from the reign of prefects Marcus Ambibulus, Valerius Gratus, Pontius Pilate and King Agrippa I, dating the fortress to 10 – 50 CE. The only fortress of its kind found along Israel's Mediterranean coast, it served as a base and anchorage for the Roman army. Its remains are the most prominent feature of present-day Tel Michal.

A Bar Kokhba coin was found at Tel Michal with a hole likely indicating its use as a pendant. It is assumed that this coin and four others found in the Sharon area, outside the borders of Judea proper, were brought there as souvenirs by Roman legionnaires.

=== Early Arab period ===
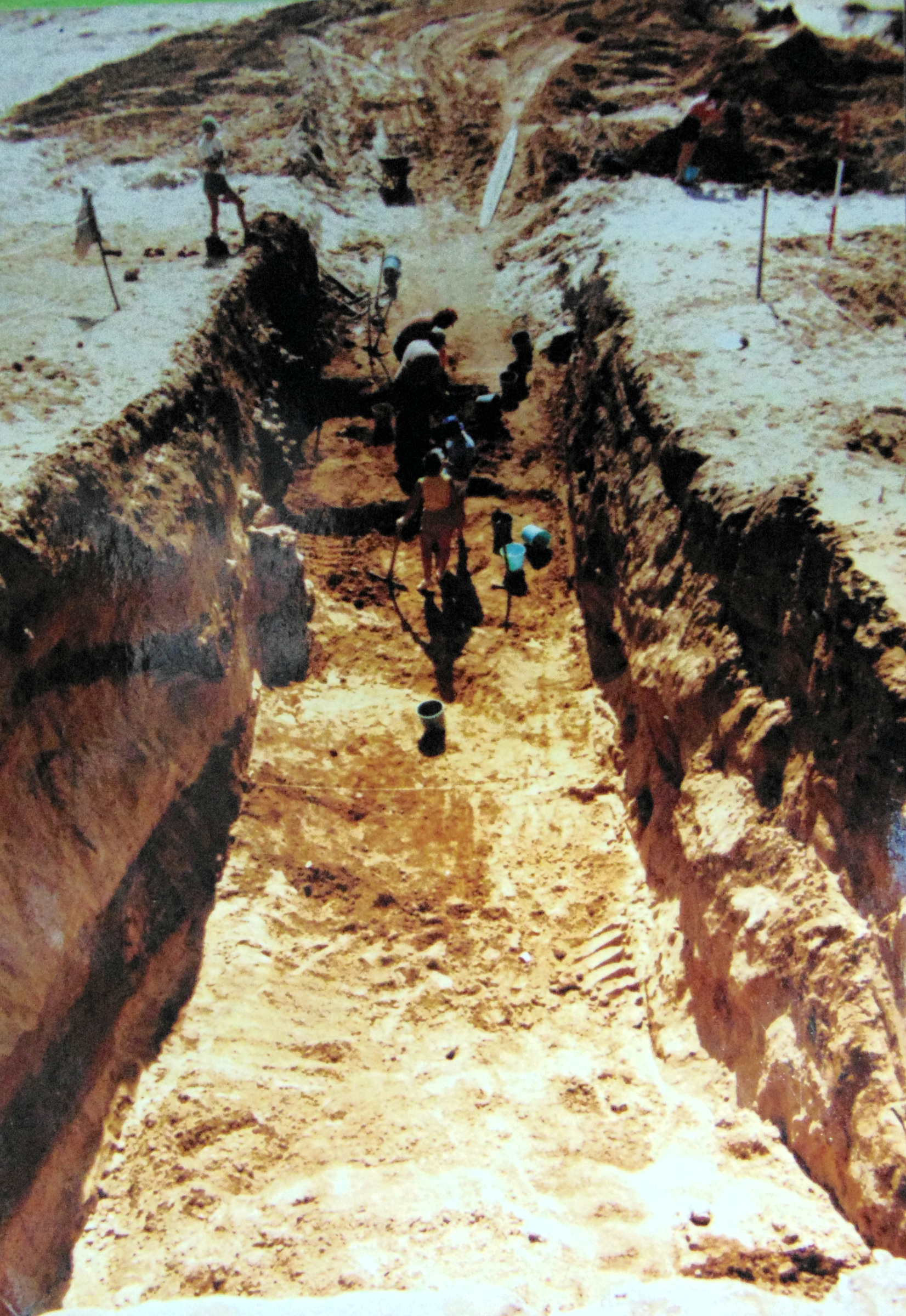
Initial deep excavation extended to the edge of the tell to verify the extent of fortification levels, visible on left side of the trench as darker layers separated by sand

The final phase of habitation at Tel Michal, stratum I, features a small watchtower built on top of the high mound. Sherds of Khirbat al-Mafjar ware and plaster decorated with geometric designs date the tower to the Abbasid period. By the late Roman period, Tel Michal had been eclipsed by the nearby city of Apollonia, and a gap of 700 years formed between the Roman layer and the site's final phase, dated to 8th and 9th centuries CE. Built on a foundation of concrete and stone blocks, the tower was probably part of an early warning network against enemy ships mentioned by Arab geographer Al-Muqaddasi.

== Research history ==
Tel Michal was first surveyed by Jacob Ory, an inspector for the British Mandate Department of Antiquities, in 1922. Ory noted that the surrounding area appears on Survey of Western Palestine maps as "Khirbet Makmish". Suspecting the site to be connected to nearby Apollonia, Ory relied on a bilingual inscription from Cyprus identifying Apollo-Amyklos with Reshef-Mekal and proposed that the ancient name of the site had been Amyklos-Mekal. The suffix "ish" was later added to Mekal, which was then distorted from Mekalish to Makmish. In 1959, the Israeli Government Names Committee accordingly named it Tel Michal, although no etymological connection between Mekal and the Hebrew name Michal has been established.

The site was again excavated by Ory in 1940 and by R.W. Hamilton in 1944. Between 1958 and 1960, archaeologist Nahman Avigad conducted a salvage excavation at the northern hill on behalf of the Eretz Israel Museum and the Hebrew University of Jerusalem. Tel Michal was excavated again during four seasons from 1977 to 1980 under Ze'ev Herzog and James Muhly, as part of a regional project to explore the western Yarkon River basin. Besides the Institute of Archaeology at Tel Aviv, participating institutions included the University of Minnesota Duluth, Brigham Young University, the University of Pennsylvania, the Wisconsin Lutheran Seminary, Hamline University, the Central Michigan University and Macquarie University of North Ryde, Australia. Zeev Herzog conducted another salvage excavation at the site in 1982 after tractors uncovered remains of plastered structures east of the high mound, revealing four Iron Age wine presses.

=== 1979/80 Seasons ===
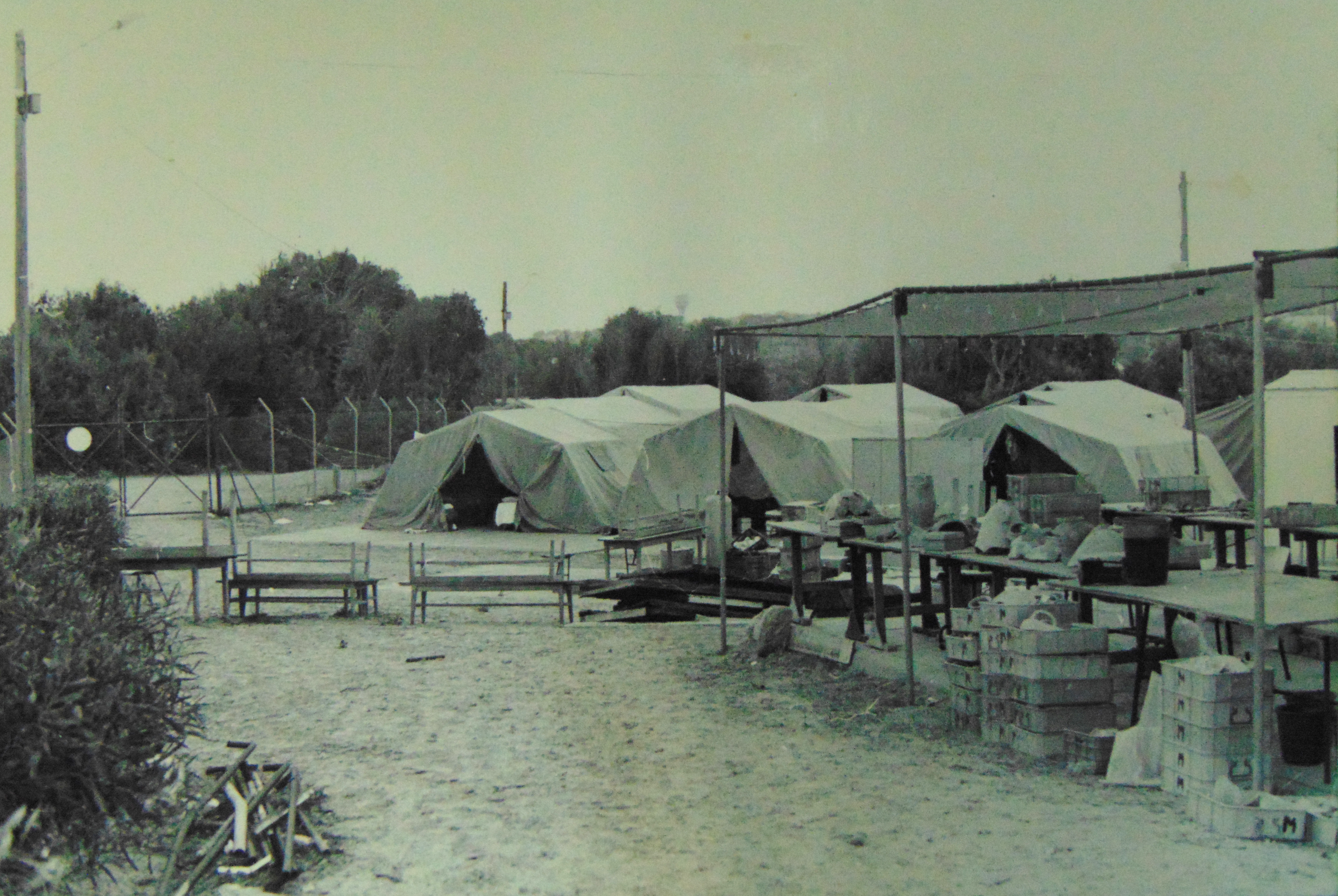
Campsite and pottery sorting tables, 1979

Staff and students were housed in tents in a secure compound about 4 km north of Tel Michal. Excavation work continued from about 6am to 2pm. Pottery of the day was sorted in the evening.

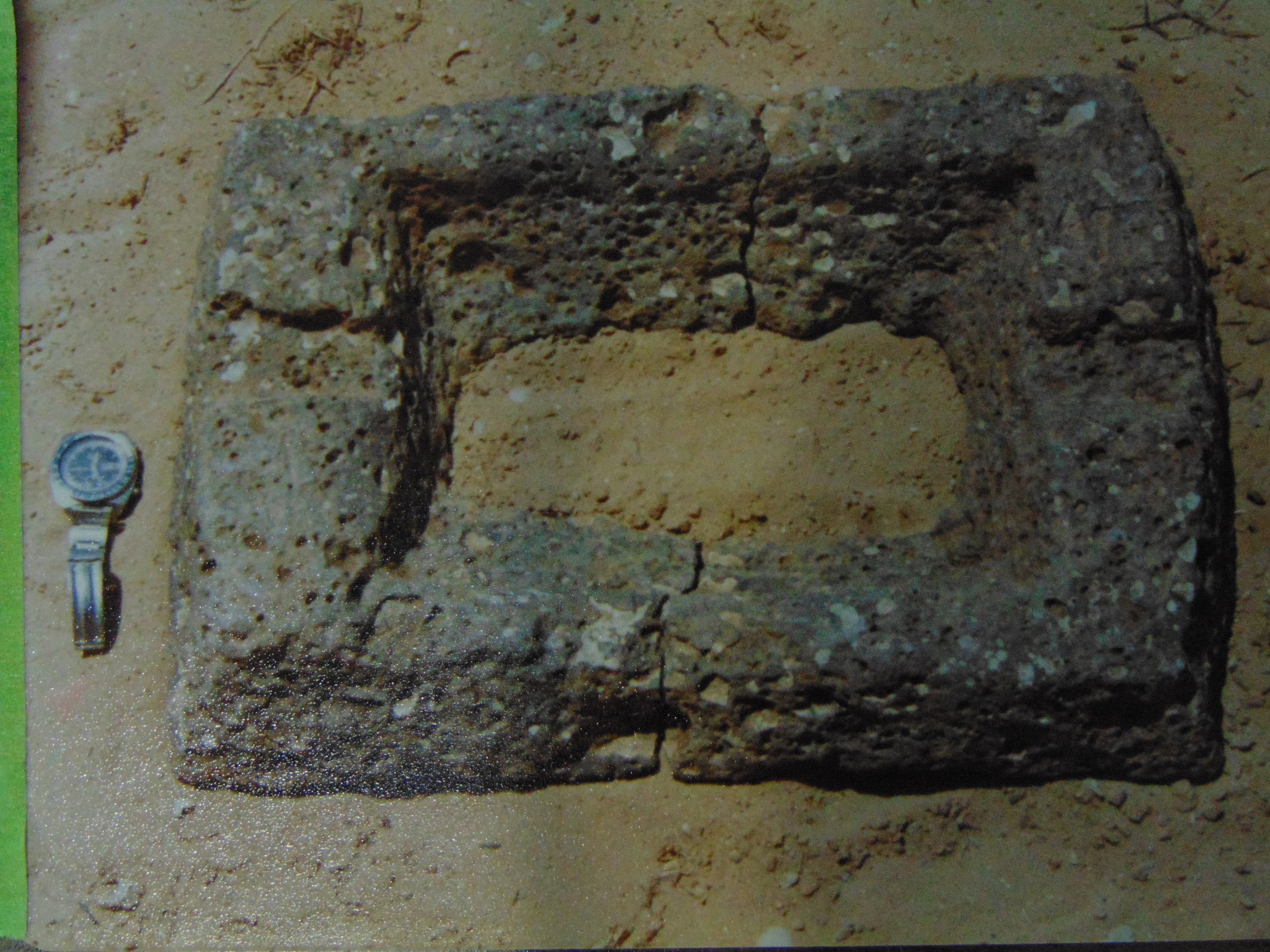
Grain grinding stone, Persian period strata

The hole was a standard 10' x 10' grid and was excavated to a depth of around 7 meters. At around 4 meters the sand changed to earthworks. Further excavation indicated that several construction levels were present, as seen by the colour changes in the strata.

The hole was later extended into a trench using a bulldozer, which verified at least two distinct platforms from different periods.

== See also ==
- Tel Gerisa
- Tel Zeror
- Archaeology of Israel
