= Valerius Gratus =

Roman governor of Judea from 15 to 26

4th Prefect of Judaea
- In office c. 15 AD – 26 AD
- Appointed by: Tiberius
- Preceded by: Annius Rufus
- Succeeded by: Pontius Pilate

Valerius Gratus was a Roman administrator who served as the 4th prefect of Judaea. During his tenure he appointed four people as the High Priest of Israel.

== Sources ==
The 1st century CE Jewish historian Josephus is the only source for Annius Rufus. Little historical research can be done on Rufus due to how common his name was; Gratus, Latin for pleasing or dear, was a common name among slaves and freemen of the Roman Empire.

== Career ==
Map of the province of Judaea during Valerius Gratus's governorship

Valerius Gratus was appointed by Tiberius to replace Annius Rufus as prefect of Judaea. Gratus served as prefect from 15 to 26 CE, the longest tenure for anybody that held the office. Gratus issued his own coinage. The historian Tacitus, writing about the events leading to the First Jewish–Roman War, simply stated that "under Tiberius all was peaceful".

Gratus deposed Annas, the High Priest of Israel, and appointed four high priests over the course of his tenure, two of whom served less than one year; Ishmael ben Fabus, Eleazar, Simon ben Camithus, and Caiaphas. The reason for his dissatisfaction with these high priests is unknown.

Pontius Pilate was selected to replace Gratus as prefect. The apocryphal Letter of Lentulus claimed that Lentulus preceded Pilate as prefect, but there is no historical evidence of his existence.

== Cultural depictions ==
Gratus is featured in the novel Ben-Hur: A Tale of the Christ (1880). He imprisoned Judah Ben-Hur's mother and sister and seized their property; these were the inciting incidents of the novel. Judah Ben-Hur is sentenced to slavery after being found guilty of attempting to assassinate Gratus.

== See also ==
- Gens Valeria
- Roman administration of Judaea (AD 6–135)

== Works cited ==
=== Books ===
- Gatrall, Jefferson (2014). The Real and the Sacred: Picturing Jesus in Nineteenth-Century Fiction. University of Michigan Press. ISBN 9780472120253.
- Mason, Steve (2008). Flavius Josephus: Translation and Commentary. Vol. 1B. Brill Publishers. ISBN 9789004169340.
- Rogers, Guy (2021). For the Freedom of Zion: The Great Revolt of Jews against Romans, 66–74 CE. Yale University Press. ISBN 9780300248135.
- Safrai, S.; Stern, M. (1974). The Jewish People in the First Century: Historical Geography, Political History, Social, Cultural and Religious Life and Institutions. Vol. 1. Brill Publishers. ISBN 9789023210702.
- Smallwood, E. (2001). The Jews under Roman Rule from Pompey to Diocletian. Brill Publishers. ISBN 9780391041554.
- Solomon, Jon (2016). Ben-Hur: The Original Blockbuster. Edinburgh University Press. ISBN 9781474407946.

=== Journals ===
- Bond, Helen (1996). "The Coins of Pontius Pilate: Part of an Attempt to Provoke the People or to Integrate them into the Empire?". Journal for the Study of Judaism in the Persian, Hellenistic, and Roman Period. 27 (3). Brill Publishers: 241–262. doi:10.2307/24660068. JSTOR 24660068.
- Smallwood, E. (1962). "High Priests and Politics in Roman Palestine". The Journal of Theological Studies. 13 (1). Oxford University Press: 14–34. doi:10.2307/23958116. JSTOR 23958116.
- Squires, L. (2013). "The Wealthiest Man in the Empire: Ben-Hur as Model of Evangelical Political Engagement". Arizona Quarterly. 69 (1). Johns Hopkins University Press: 23–46.
- Syme, Ronald (1986). "Three Ambivii". The Classical Quarterly. 36 (1). Cambridge University Press: 271–276. doi:10.2307/638969. JSTOR 638969.

Valerius Gratus Roman Rulers of Judea
Preceded by Annius Rufus	Prefect of Judaea	Succeeded by Pontius Pilate
