= Coponius =

Roman governor of the ancient Roman Judaea province (from 6 CE to 9 CE)

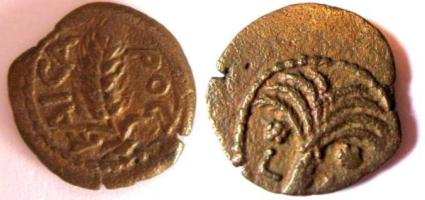
Coin of Coponius

Coponius was the first Roman prefect of Judaea from 6 to 9 CE after the ethnarch of Herod Archelaus was turned into a Roman province. He oversaw the Census of Quirinius with Quirinius and the response to the revolt of Judas the Galilean.

== Sources ==
The 1st century CE Jewish historian Josephus is the only source for Coponius.

== Career ==
Map of the province of Judaea during Coponius' governorship

The ethnarch kingdom of Herod Archelaus was turned into a Roman province in 6 CE and Coponius was appointed as the first person to serve as prefect of Judaea. He was, like the prefects who succeeded him, an eques, and "had the power of life and death". Coponius and Governor of Roman Syria Quirinius oversaw the Census of Quirinius in 6 CE. During his administration the revolt of Judas the Galilean occurred in response to the census. Coponius issued his own coinage.

A group of Samaritans entered the Second Temple precinct during Passover in 7 or 8 CE and scattered human bones at the portico entrance. The Temple was closed by the priests in order to purify it, resulting in celebrations being interrupted and the Temple losing revenue. Guy MacLean Rogers theorizes that Coponius' recall to Rome in 9 CE might have been connected to this incident. The Temple captain and the guards underneath him might have been created as a result of this incident; Eleazar ben Hanania, who served as Temple captain in 66 CE, helped ferment the First Jewish–Roman War. The door that the Samaritans entered through was possibly given the name "door of Coponius".

Coponius was recalled to Rome in 9 CE and replaced by Marcus Ambivulus.

== See also ==
- Coponia gens

== Works cited ==
=== Books ===
- Rogers, Guy (2021). For the Freedom of Zion: The Great Revolt of Jews against Romans, 66–74 CE. Yale University Press. ISBN 9780300248135.

=== Journals ===
- Bond, Helen (1996). "The Coins of Pontius Pilate: Part of an Attempt to Provoke the People or to Integrate them into the Empire?". Journal for the Study of Judaism in the Persian, Hellenistic, and Roman Period. 27 (3). Brill Publishers: 241–262. doi:10.2307/24660068. JSTOR 24660068.
- Dąbrowa, Edward (2011). "The Date of the Census of Quirinius and the Chronology of the Governors of the Province of Syria". Zeitschrift für Papyrologie und Epigraphik (178). Rudolf Habelt GmbH: 137–142. doi:10.2307/41616761. JSTOR 41616761.
- Smallwood, E. (1962). "High Priests and Politics in Roman Palestine". The Journal of Theological Studies. 13 (1). Oxford University Press: 14–34. doi:10.2307/23958116. JSTOR 23958116.
- Syme, Ronald (1986). "Three Ambivii". The Classical Quarterly. 36 (1). Cambridge University Press: 271–276. doi:10.2307/638969. JSTOR 638969.

=== Web ===
- Krauss, Samuel; Gottheil, Richard. "Coponius". The Jewish Encyclopedia. Archived from the original on 4 November 2026.

Coponius Roman Rulers of Judea
Preceded by Herod Archelaus, Ethnarch of Samaria, Judea, and Edom	Prefect of Judaea	Succeeded by Marcus Ambivulus
