= Coponia gens =

The gens Coponia was a plebeian family at Rome. The family was prominent at Rome during the first century BC. The most famous of the gens may have been Gaius Coponius, praetor in 49 BC, and a partisan of Pompeius, whom although proscribed by the triumvirs in 43, was subsequently pardoned, and came to be regarded as a greatly respected member of the Senate.

== Origin ==
The Coponii originally came from Tibur, where an inscription bearing the name was found.

== Praenomina used ==
The Coponii are known to have used the praenomina Titus, Marcus, and Gaius.

== Members ==
This list includes abbreviated praenomina. For an explanation of this practice, see filiation.

- Titus Coponius, of Tibur, a man of distinguished merit and rank, was made a Roman citizen upon the condemnation of Gaius Masso, whom he accused.
- Marcus Coponius, party to a lawsuit pleaded by Quintus Scaevola in the court of the centumviri, 93 BC.
- Titus and Gaius Coponius T. n., two brothers spoken of by Cicero as young men of great acquirements, 56 BC.
- Coponius, left in command of Carrhae during the expedition of Crassus against the Parthians, 53 BC. Possibly the same as the praetor of 49.
- Gaius Coponius, praetor in 49 BC, and a partisan of Pompeius during the Civil War. Later a greatly respected member of the Senate.
- Coponius, a Roman sculptor, who made fourteen statues representing nations conquered by Pompeius. They stood in the entrance hall to the Theatre of Pompeius, giving it the name Porticus ad Nationes.
- Coponius, governor of Judaea from 6 AD to 9 AD

== See also ==
- List of Roman gentes
