= Marcus Ambivulus =

Roman prefect of Judea from AD 9 to 12

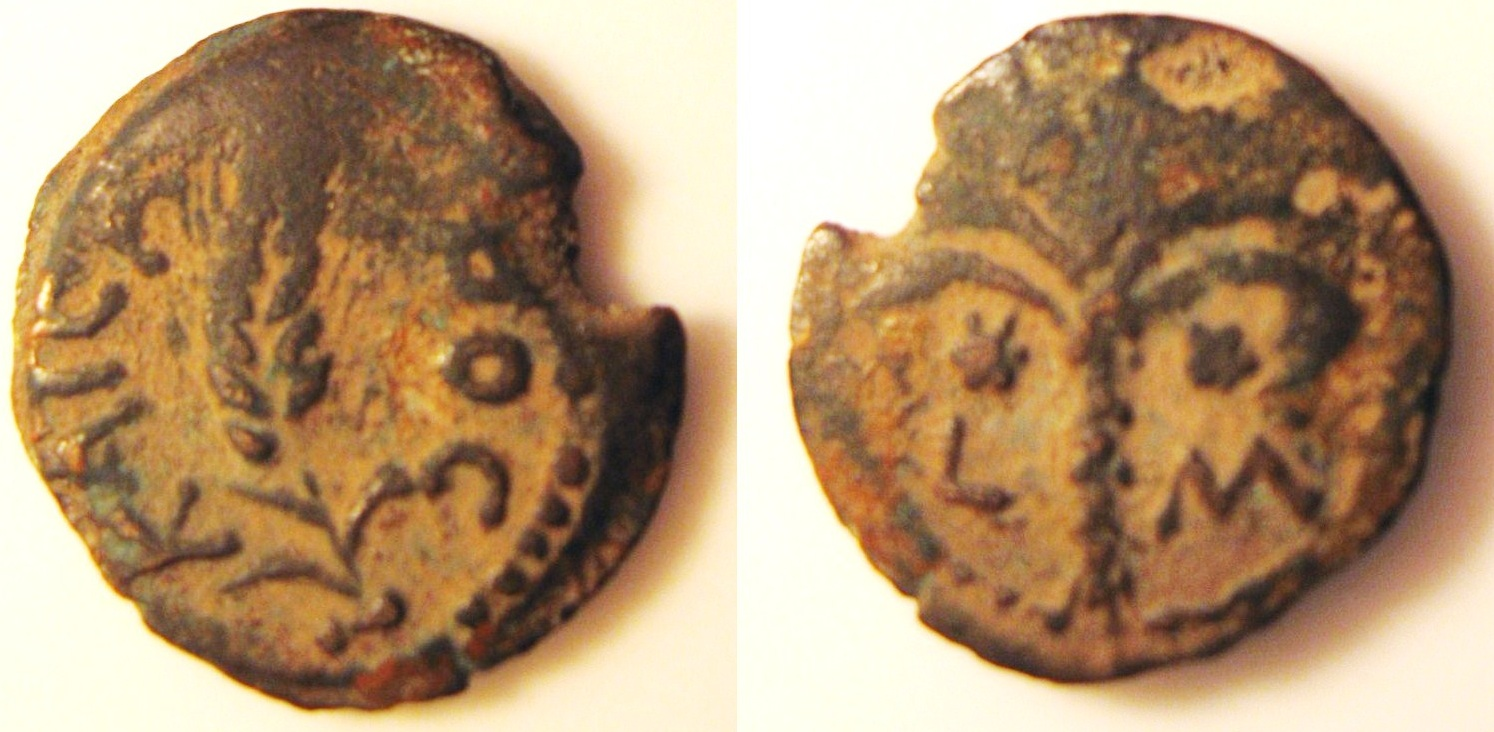
Coin of Marcus Ambivulus. Issued in 10 AD.

Marcus Ambivulus was the 2nd Roman Prefect of the province of Judea, comprising biblical Judea and Samaria.

== History ==
Originally a cavalry officer, he succeeded Coponius in 9 and ruled the area until 12, when he was succeeded by Annius Rufus. Josephus noted his tenure in the Antiquities of the Jews 18.31.

== See also ==
- Roman administration of Judaea (AD 6–135)
- Roman Procurator coinage

Marcus Ambivulus Roman Rulers of Judea
Preceded by Coponius	Prefect of Judaea	Succeeded by Annius Rufus
