= Jarisha =

Jarisha جرِيشة Jerisha, Jarush
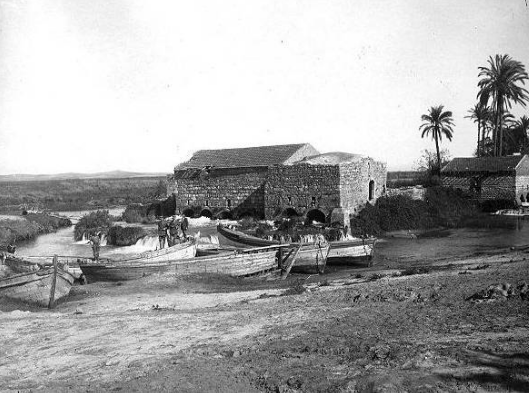
- Old mill at Jarisha, about 1917
- Etymology: Jerisheh, from "to pound" or "grind"
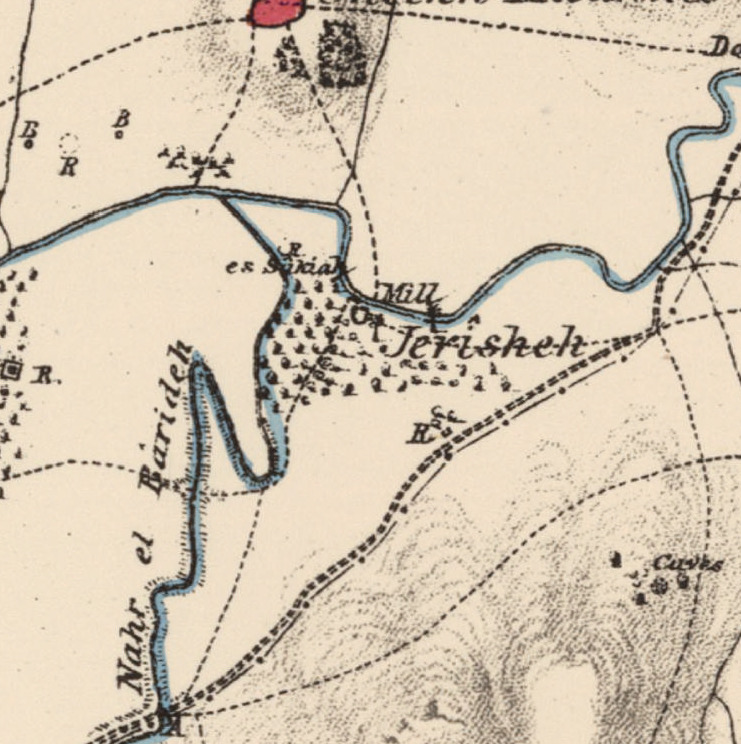
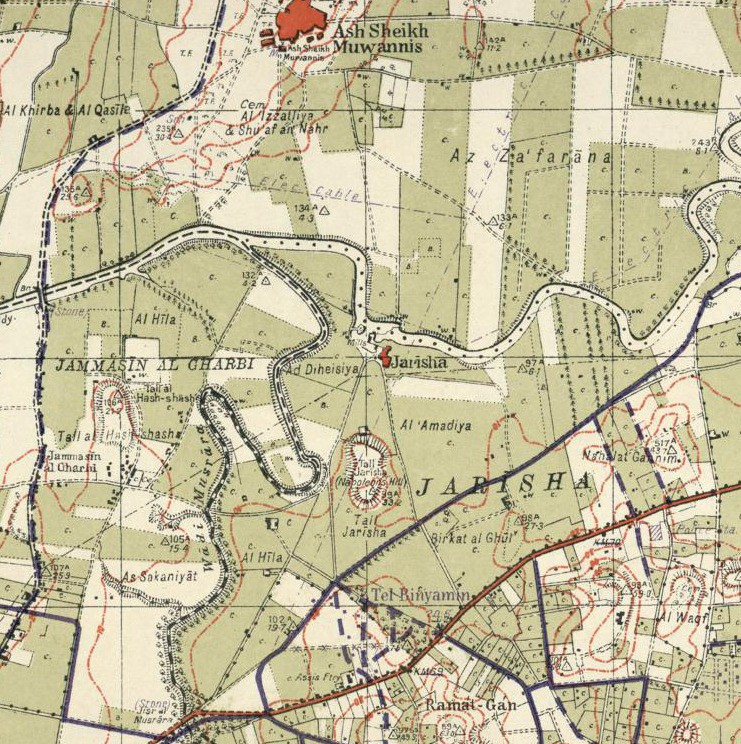
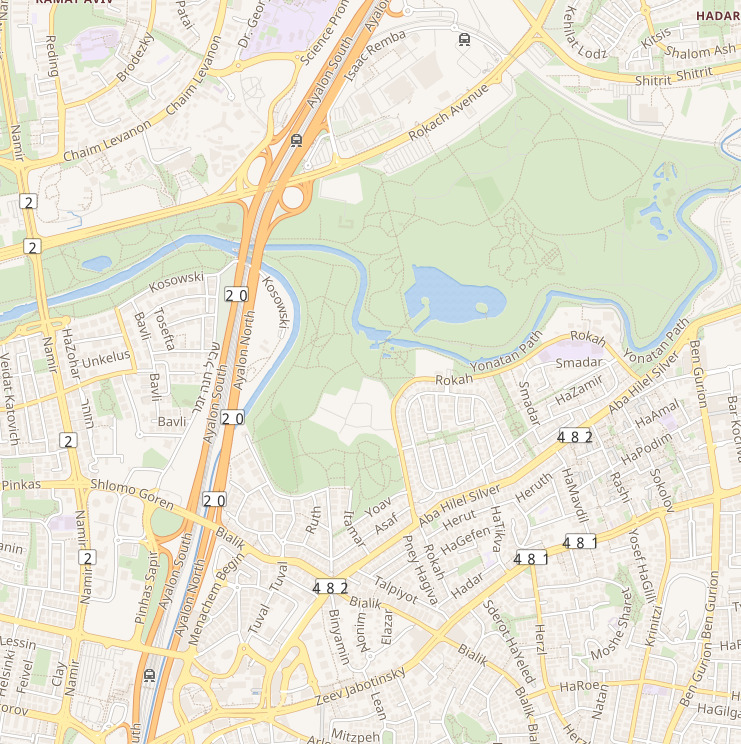
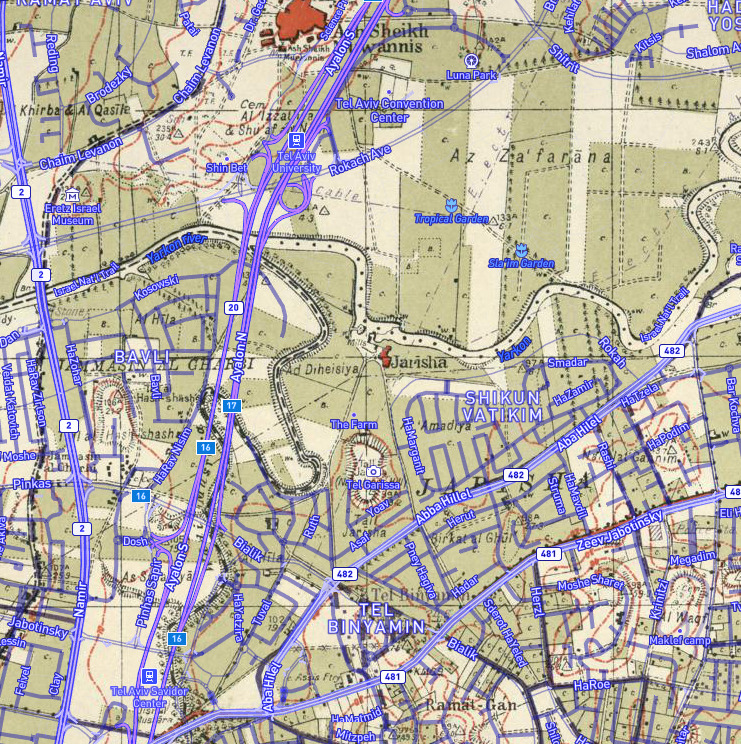
- 1870s map 1940s map modern map 1940s with modern overlay map A series of historical maps of the area around Jarisha (click the buttons)

- Location within Mandatory Palestine
- Coordinates: 32°5′43″N 34°48′28″E
- Palestine grid: 132/167
- Geopolitical entity: Mandatory Palestine
- Subdistrict: Jaffa

Area
  - Total: 555 dunams (55.5 ha; 137 acres)

Population (1945)
  - Total: 190
- Current Localities: Yarkon Park, Tel Aviv, Ramat Gan

Jarisha (Arabic: جرِيشة, also transliterated Jerisha; Hebrew: ג'רישה) was a Palestinian Arab village located 200 meters (660 ft) from the ancient site of Tell Jarisha (Tel Gerisa), on the south bank of Al-Awja (Yarkon River). After the establishment of Tel Aviv, it was one of five Arab villages to fall within its municipal boundaries. Jarisha was depopulated in the lead up to the 1948 Arab–Israeli war.

== History ==
=== Early Bronze Age ===
Jarisha was located only 200 meters (660 ft) from Tel Gerisa, an archaeological site dating to the Early Bronze II period (2800–2600 BC).

=== Middle Bronze Age ===
In the Middle Bronze period (2000–1500 BC) the site was a fortified Hyksos town.

=== Late Bronze Age and Iron Age ===
It was succeeded by a Philistine settlement around the 12th century BC.

=== Ottoman period ===
In the 1596 tax records under the Ottoman Empire, it was a village in the nahiya ("subdistrict") of the Bani Sa'b, part of Nablus Sanjak. It had a population of 22 Muslim households; an estimated 121 persons, who paid taxes on buffalo, goats and beehives; a total of 2,150 akçe.

In 1856 the village was named Darishah on Kiepert's map of Palestine published that year. An Ottoman village list from about 1870 showed that the village had a population of 76 in a total of 38 houses, though that population count included men, only. It was further noted that it was located 6000 meters NE of Jaffa.

In 1882 the PEF's Survey of Western Palestine (SWP) described the village, transcribed as "Jerisheh", as being built of adobe bricks and flanked by an olive grove. It had a well and a mill. South-east of the village was the ruins of a Khan, a graveyard and some caves, also a masonry dam and a small bridge, "apparently Saracenic".

=== British Mandate era ===
In the 1922 census of Palestine conducted by the British Mandate authorities, Jerisheh had a population of 57, all Muslims increasing by the 1931 census to 183, still all Muslims, in a total of 43 houses.

Since May 1944, Jarisha has been part of the municipality of Ramat Gan.

In the 1945 statistics it had a population of 190 Muslims, with 555 dunams of land. The villagers worked in the service industry, but some also grew fruits and vegetables; in 1944–1945 a total of 302 dunums of village land was used for citrus and bananas, and 89 dunums were irrigated or used for orchards. 3 dunams were classified as built-up areas.

=== 1948 and after ===
According to the Palestinian historian Walid Khalidi, the state of the village site in 1992 was as follows: "The site has been completely covered over by highways and suburban houses."

== Gallery ==
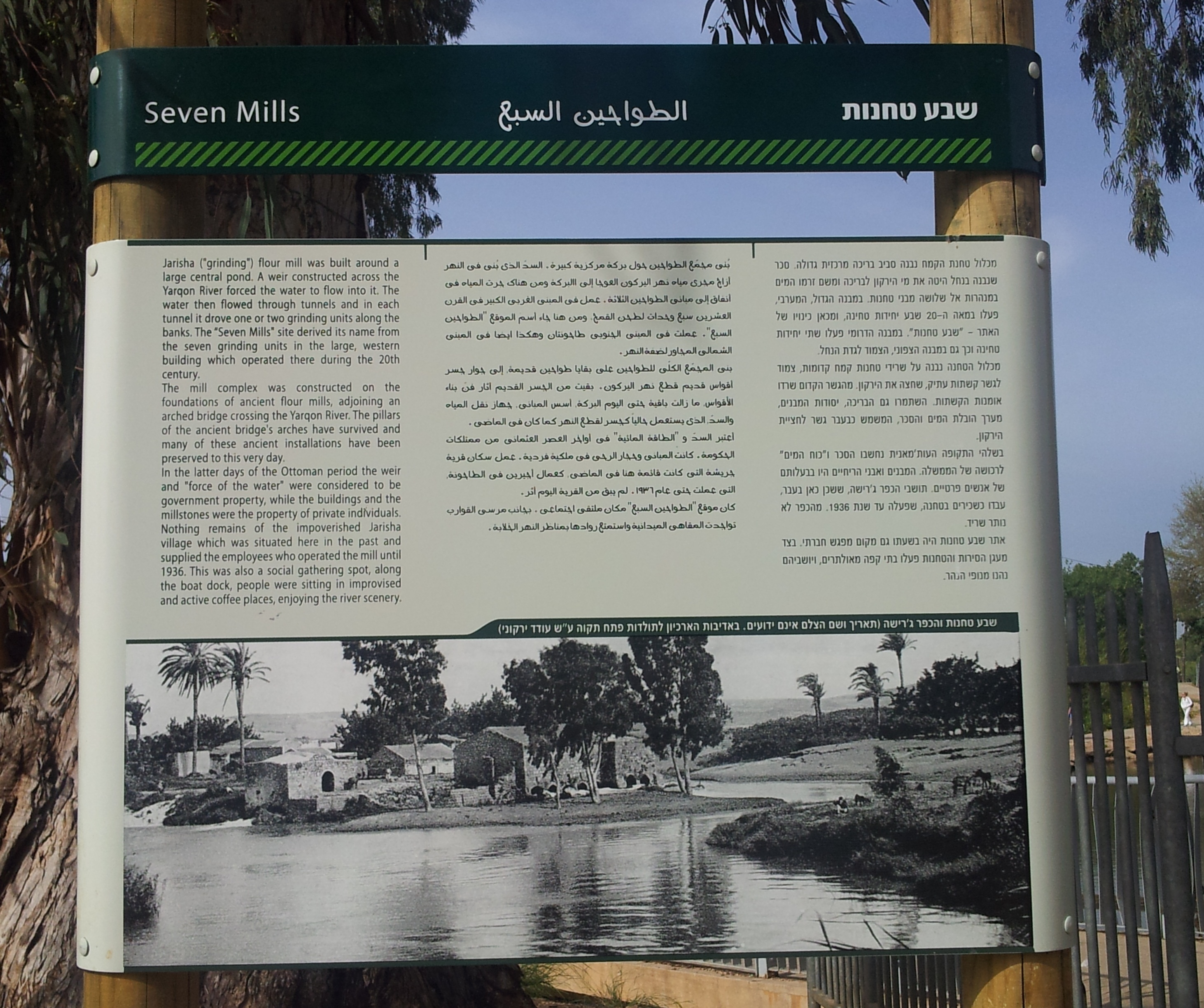
Seven Mills sign in Yarkon Park: “Nothing remains of the impoverished Jarisha village which was situated here in the past”

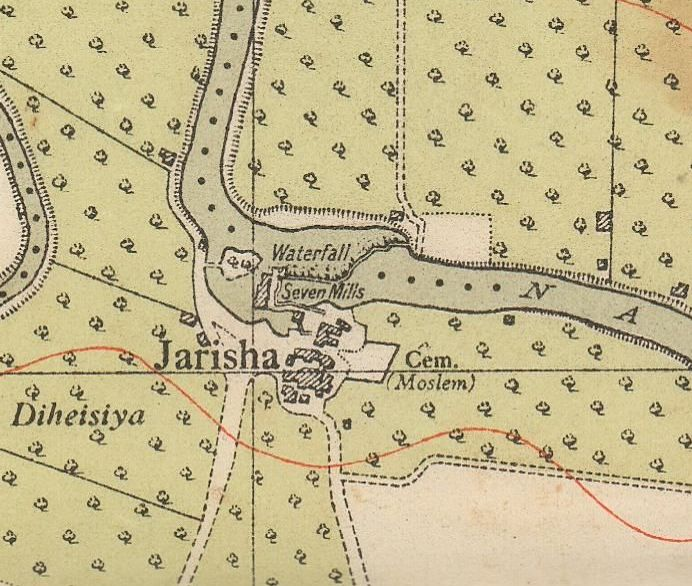
Jarisha village in the Map of Jaffa Tel Aviv Compiled, drawn and printed by the Survey of Palestine 1944

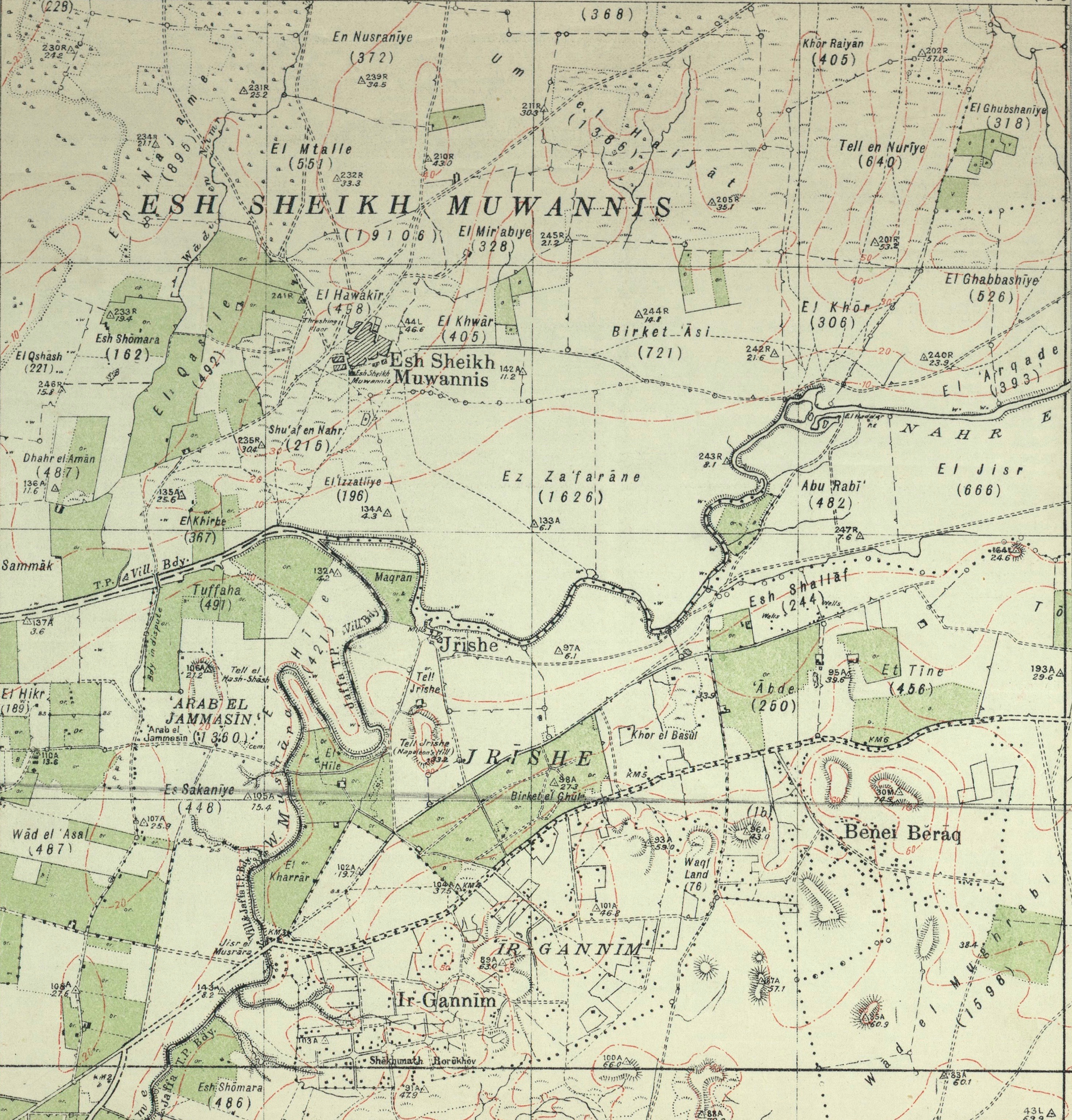
Jarisha (Jrishe) 1928 1:20,000

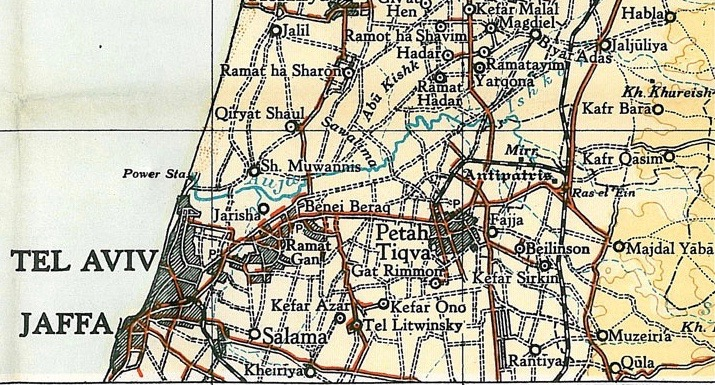
Jarisha 1945 1:250,000

== See also ==
- Depopulated Palestinian locations in Israel

== Bibliography ==
- Ben-Tor, Amnon; Greenberg, R. (1992). The archaeology of ancient Israel.
- Barron, J.B., ed. (1923). Palestine: Report and General Abstracts of the Census of 1922. Government of Palestine.
- Clermont-Ganneau, C.S. (1895). Études d'archéologie orientale (in French). Paris: E. Bouillon. (pp. 192−196: "Les Trois−Ponts, Jorgilia")
- Conder, C.R.; Kitchener, H.H. (1882). The Survey of Western Palestine: Memoirs of the Topography, Orography, Hydrography, and Archaeology. Vol. 2. London: Committee of the Palestine Exploration Fund.
- Department of Statistics (1945). Village Statistics, April, 1945. Government of Palestine.
- Hadawi, S. (1970). Village Statistics of 1945: A Classification of Land and Area ownership in Palestine. Palestine Liberation Organization Research Center.
- Hartmann, M. (1883). "Die Ortschaftenliste des Liwa Jerusalem in dem türkischen Staatskalender für Syrien auf das Jahr 1288 der Flucht (1871)". Zeitschrift des Deutschen Palästina-Vereins. 6: 102–149.
- Hütteroth, W.-D.; Abdulfattah, K. (1977). Historical Geography of Palestine, Transjordan and Southern Syria in the Late 16th Century. Erlanger Geographische Arbeiten, Sonderband 5. Erlangen, Germany: Vorstand der Fränkischen Geographischen Gesellschaft. ISBN 3-920405-41-2.
- Khalidi, W. (1992). All That Remains: The Palestinian Villages Occupied and Depopulated by Israel in 1948. Washington D.C.: Institute for Palestine Studies. ISBN 0-88728-224-5. ISBN 0-88728-224-5.
- Mann, Barbara E. (2006). A Place in History: Modernism, Tel Aviv, and the Creation of Jewish Urban Space. Stanford University Press. ISBN 978-0-8047-5019-6. ISBN 0-8047-5019-X.
- Mills, E., ed. (1932). Census of Palestine 1931. Population of Villages, Towns and Administrative Areas. Jerusalem: Government of Palestine.
- Morris, B. (2004). The Birth of the Palestinian Refugee Problem Revisited. Cambridge University Press. ISBN 0-521-00967-7.
- Palmer, E.H. (1881). The Survey of Western Palestine: Arabic and English Name Lists Collected During the Survey by Lieutenants Conder and Kitchener, R. E. Transliterated and Explained by E.H. Palmer. Committee of the Palestine Exploration Fund.
- Socin, A. (1879). "Alphabetisches Verzeichniss von Ortschaften des Paschalik Jerusalem". Zeitschrift des Deutschen Palästina-Vereins. 2: 135–163.
