= Ze'ev Herzog =

Israeli archaeologist

- זאב הרצוג
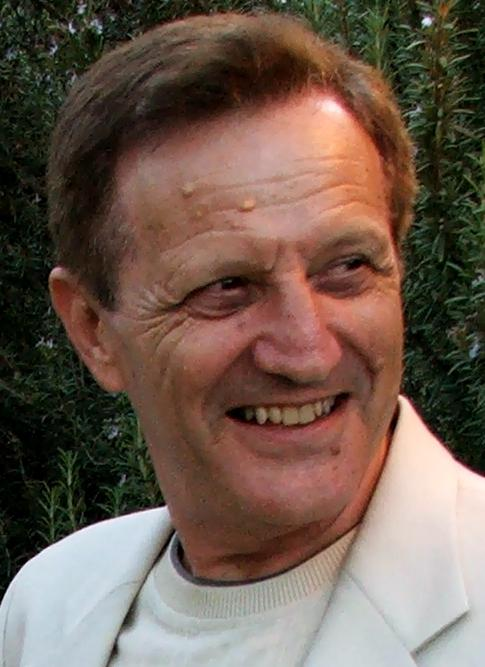
- Born: 1941
- Scientific career
- Fields: Archaeology
- Institutions: Tel Aviv University; Israel Nature and National Parks Protection Authority

Ze'ev Herzog (Hebrew: זאב הרצוג; born 1941) is an Israeli archeologist, professor of archaeology at The Department of Archaeology and Ancient Near Eastern Cultures at Tel Aviv University specializing in social archaeology, ancient architecture, and field archaeology. Ze’ev Herzog served as director of The Sonia and Marco Nadler Institute of Archaeology from 2005 to 2010, and has served as archaeological advisor to the Israel Nature and National Parks Protection Authority in the preservation and development of National Parks at Arad and Beersheba.

Herzog took part in the excavations of Tel Hazor and Tel Megiddo with Yigael Yadin and in excavations at Tel Arad and Tel Be'er Sheva with Yohanan Aharoni. He directed the excavations at Tel Beer Sheba, Tel Michal, and Tel Gerisa and at Tel Yafo (ancient Jaffa) in 1997 and 1999.

Herzog is among Israeli archaeologists who say that “biblical archaeology is not anymore the ruling paradigm in archaeology and that archaeology became an independent discipline with its own conclusions and own observations which indeed present us a picture of a reality of ancient Israel quite different from the one which is described in the biblical stories.”

In 1999 Herzog's cover page article in the weekly magazine Haaretz "Deconstructing the walls of Jericho" attracted considerable public attention and debates. In this article Herzog cites recent scholarship to support that "the Israelites were never in Egypt, did not wander in the desert, did not conquer the land in a military campaign and did not pass it on to the 12 tribes of Israel. Perhaps even harder to swallow is the fact that the united monarchy of David and Solomon, which is described by the Bible as a regional power, was at most a small tribal kingdom. And it will come as an unpleasant shock to many that the god of Israel, Jehovah, had a female consort and that the early Israelite religion adopted monotheism only in the waning period of the monarchy and not at Mount Sinai". Herzog's article was criticized by Hershel Shanks, editor of the Biblical Archaeology Review, in a letter to the same publication.

Herzog is a co-author with Israel Finkelstein of a 2007 paper which opposes claims made by Eilat Mazar who unearthed what she believed was King David's palace in Jerusalem, but is now known as the Large Stone Structure. Most scholars rejected Mazar's identification of this site as David's palace. Herzog et al.'s paper further argued that the structure that Mazar excavated should be downdated. The attempt to re-date the site received a detailed response by Amihai Mazar. Agreeing with Mazar, Avraham Faust noted that Herzog's paper was written prior to the publication of all the excavation material and that its full publication was sufficient to settle the debate in favour of Eilat Mazar's interpretation of the dating of the site.

== Publications ==
Herzog has written a number of books and articles, including:

- Beer-Sheba II: The Early Iron Age Settlements (1984)
- Excavations at Tel Michal, Israel (1989) ISBN 978-0-8166-1622-0
- Archaeology of the City: Urban Planning in Ancient Israel and Its Social Implications (1997)
- The Arad Fortresses 1997. [Hebrew].
- Redefining the centre: the emergence of state in Judah (2004)
