= Sextus Vettulenus Cerialis =

1st century Roman senator and military commander

Procurator of Judea
- In office 70–71
- Preceded by: Marcus Antonius Julianus
- Succeeded by: Sextus Lucilius Bassus

Personal details
- Born: c. 1st century
- Died: c. 1st century Roman Empire

Sextus Vettulenus Cerialis was a Roman senator and military commander, the 1st legate of Judaea. He was an early supporter of Vespasian, who appointed Cerialis suffect consul in either 72 or 73.

== Origins ==
Cerialis was of Sabine origin. He was born in Reate. Ronald Syme speculates that the Sex. Vettulenus Cerialis memorialized with his wife Lusia Galla in an inscription recovered at Venafro was Cerialis' father and mother; if that is the case, his father served as a soldier, and his career was capped as primus pilus of Legio XI. At least one brother is attested for him: Gaius Vettulenus Civica Cerealis, suffect consul in either 72 or 73 according to Syme, or between 73 and 76, according to Gallivan.

== Career ==
Edward Dabrowa lists Cerialis "amongst the Sabine people who, due to Vespasian, gained high ranks and were admitted to the Roman political elite." Based on the most commonly accepted interpretation of an acephalous inscription from Carthage, Nero conferred many honors on him. However, his first attested office was as legate or commander of Legio V Macedonica around the year 67. He held this commission through the First Jewish–Roman War to the end of the siege of Jerusalem in 70. Josephus writes that in the summer of 67, after the Samaritans failed to disarm and disperse, the Fifth Legion under Cerialis' command slaughtered 11,600 of them on Mount Gerizim. Cerialis impressed Vespasian with his courage and his success in numerous military actions. After the fall of Jerusalem, Cerialis was appointed governor of Judea and legate of Legio X Fretensis. He held both offices until at least AD 71, when he was replaced by Sextus Lucilius Bassus.

Following his consulship, Cerialis was appointed governor of Moesia, where he is attested by one military diploma dated 28 April 75, and a second dated 7 February 78. An acephalic inscription found in Carthage has been attributed to him, which would attest he was proconsul of Africa for the term 83/84.

== Family ==
Although the name of his wife is not known, Cerialis is considered the father of Sextus Vettulenus Civica Cerialis, ordinary consul in 106.

== Notes ==
Political offices
| Preceded by ?Marcus Antonius Julianus | Legate of Iudaea; 70–71 | Succeeded by Sextus Lucilius Bassus |
