= Gessius Florus =

Roman procurator of Judea from AD 64 until 66

Procurator of Judea
- In office 64–66
- Preceded by: Lucceius Albinus
- Succeeded by: Marcus Antonius Julianus

Personal details
- Born: c. 1st century Klazomenai, Asia, Roman Empire
- Died: c. 1st century Roman Empire

Gessius Florus was the 7th Roman procurator of Judea from 64 until 66.

== Biography ==
Born in Clazomenae, Florus was appointed to replace Lucceius Albinus as procurator by the Emperor Nero due to his wife Cleopatra's friendship with Nero's wife Poppaea. He was noted for his antagonism toward the Judean and Jewish population, and is credited by Josephus as being the primary cause of the First Jewish–Roman War.

Upon taking office in Caesarea, Florus began favoring local Greek population of the city over the Jewish population. The local Greek population noticed Florus' policies and took advantage of the circumstances. One notable instance of provocation occurred while the Jews were worshiping at their local synagogue and a Hellenist sacrificed several birds on top of a chamber pot at the entrance of the synagogue, an act that rendered the building ritually unclean. In response to this action, the Jews sent a group of men to petition Florus for redress. Despite accepting a payment of eight talents to hear the case, Florus refused to listen to the complaints and instead had the petitioners imprisoned.

Florus further angered the Jewish population of his province by having seventeen talents removed from the treasury of the Temple in Jerusalem, claiming the money was for the Emperor. In response to this action, the city fell into unrest and some of the Jewish population began to openly mock Florus by passing a basket around to collect money as if Florus were poor. Florus reacted to the unrest by sending soldiers into Jerusalem the next day to raid the city and arrest a number of the city leaders. The arrested individuals were whipped and crucified despite many of them being Roman citizens.

After the outbreak of the First Jewish–Roman War, Florus was replaced as procurator by Marcus Antonius Julianus.

== See also ==
- Prefects, Procurators, and Legates of Roman Judaea

== Notes ==
Political offices
| Preceded by Lucceius Albinus | Procurator of Judea; 64–66 | Succeeded by Marcus Antonius Julianus |
