= Tel Gerisa =

Archaeological site in central Israel

Tel Gerisa, Tell Jerishe, Tel Napoleon
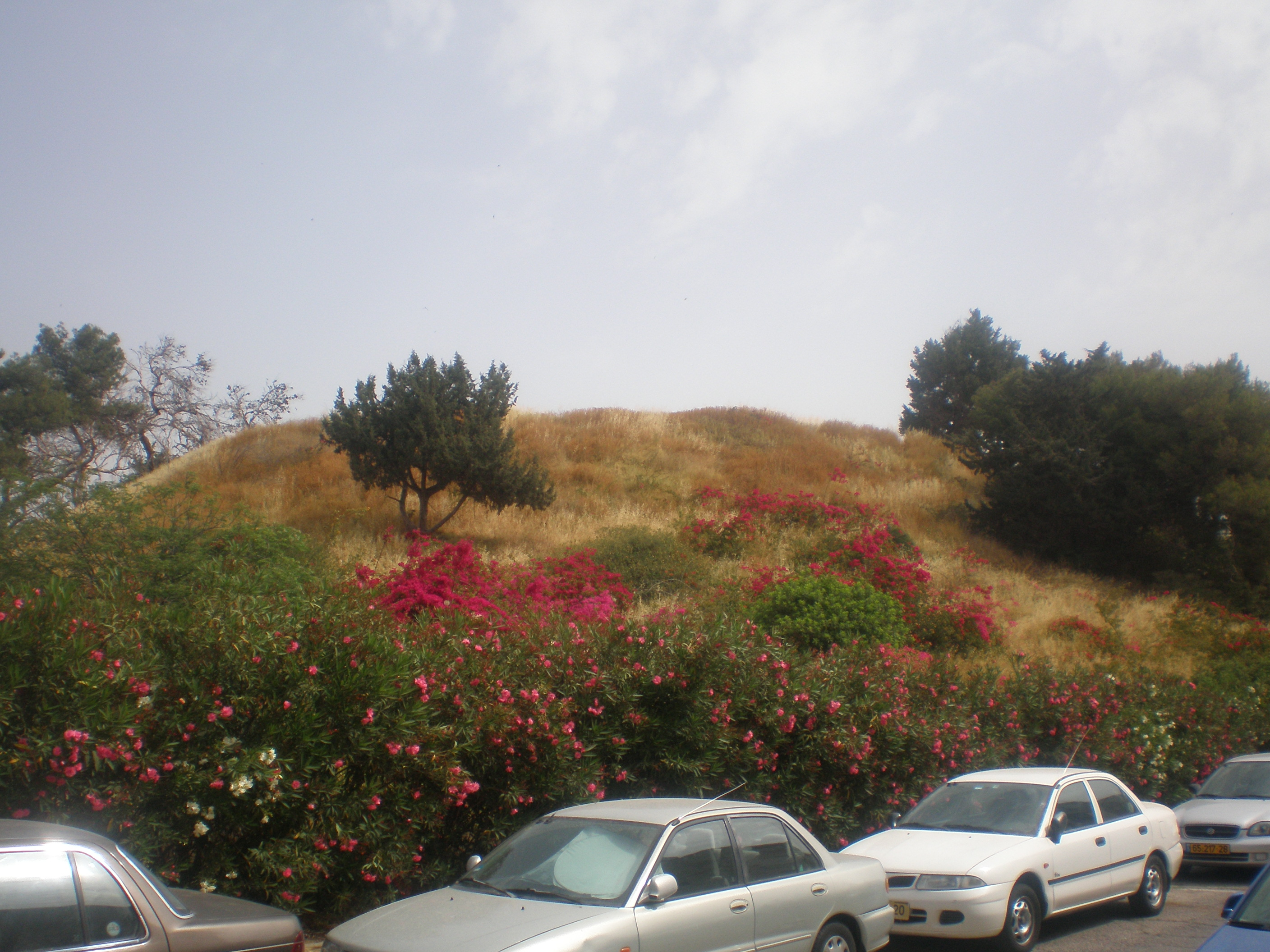
- Tel Gerisa ("Tel Napoleon")

- Location within Israel
- 32°05′30″N 34°48′27″E
- Location: Tel Aviv
- New Israel Grid: 1820/6667

Tel Gerisa (Hebrew: תל גריסה) or Tell Jerishe and Tell Jarisha (Arabic), commonly known as Tel Napoleon (Hebrew: תל נפוליאון, lit. 'Napoleon's Hill'), as his army camped on it during the siege of Jaffa, is an archaeological site in Tel Aviv, Israel, on the southern bank of the Yarkon River. The Tel measures c. 40 dunams. The main phases of the site are dated to the Middle and Late Bronze Ages, with a smaller settlement in Iron Age I and going into decline in Iron Age II (10th century BCE).

Tel Napoleon became part of Tel Aviv on 10 January 1946.

== Excavation history ==
Eliezer Sukenik led the excavations at the site between 1927 and 1951 on behalf of the Hebrew University of Jerusalem. The Israel Department of Antiquities excavated the site in 1976 (Yigal Yadin and Shulamit Geva). Tel Aviv University's Institute of Archaeology explored the tell between 1981 and 1995 under the direction of Ze'ev Herzog.

== Identification ==
The tell is about 500 meters south of the site of the former Arab village Jerisha. The original Bronze and Iron Age name of the settlement is unknown.

It was suggested that "Gerisa has been identified ... with the Levitical city of Gath Rimmon" from Joshua 19:45, by following the opinion of Benjamin Mazar. Gath Rimmon is recorded as having been donated to the Levites by the tribe of Dan in Joshua 21:24 and also by the tribe of Manasseh in Joshua 21:25, but in 1 Chronicles 6:69 it is said to have been given from the lands of the tribe of Ephraim. However, Anson Rainey was convinced that Gath-rimmon is identical with Gittaim and is to be found at or near Ramla.
