= Tiberianus =

2nd-century Roman politician

Tiberianus was a 2nd-century Roman politician.

== Biography ==
The Byzantine chronicler Johannes Malalas (ed. Dindorf, p. 273) speaks of him as 10th legate of the first province of Palestine (ἡγεμὼν τοῦ πρώτου Παλαιστίνων ἔθνους), in connection with the sojourn of Hadrian in Antioch (114–117). A similar notice may be found in Johannes Antiochenus (In Müller, "Fragmenta Historicorum Græcorum," iv. 580, No. 111) and in Suda, s.v. Τραϊανός. The designation "Palestina prima," which came into use in the middle of the fourth century, gives a historical character to this notice. These authors use a later designation for the earlier period.

== See also ==
- List of Hasmonean and Herodian rulers
