= Helen Bond =

British biblical scholar

Helen Bond FRSE
- Born: Helen Katharine Bond; 1968 (age 57–58)
- Spouse: Keith Raffan

Academic background
- Education: University of St Andrews; University of Tübingen; Durham University
- Thesis: Pontius Pilate in History and Interpretation (1994)
- Doctoral advisor: James Dunn

Academic work
- Discipline: Biblical studies
- Sub-discipline: New Testament studies
- School or tradition: Presbyterianism
- Institutions: University of Edinburgh

Helen Katharine Bond (born 1968) is a British Professor of Christian Origins and New Testament. She has written many books related to Pontius Pilate, Jesus and Judaism.

== Biography ==
Bond was born in 1968 and raised in the North East of England. She attended Durham High School. She read biblical studies at the Durham University, University of Tübingen, and the University of St Andrews. At Durham, she completed her PhD on Pontius Pilate under the supervision of James Dunn.

From 1996 to 2000 Bond taught New Testament at the University of Aberdeen, and since 2000 has taught at the University of Edinburgh.

Since 2011, Bond has served as Director of the Centre for the Study of Christian Origins and, she was Head of the School of Divinity, University of Edinburgh from 2018 - 2023. She currently serves as Professor of Christian Origins at the New College.

She is a member of the Church of Scotland (Falkirk Old Parish Church) and is married to Keith Raffan. Together, they have two children, Katriona and Scott.

Bond was elected a Fellow of the Royal Society of Edinburgh (FRSE) in March 2021.

In 2023, Bond began co-hosting the Biblical Time Machine podcast with journalist David Roos. The podcast discusses the social, political and theological history of the Bible and adjacent texts. Bond and co-host centre episodes under the guise that they are travelling back in time in the eponymous time machine, often to Judea in the first century CE. In 2025, historian Lloyd Llewellyn Jones joined the podcast as co-host following Roos' departure. They often invite expert guests to speak on different aspects of ancient history. Notable guests have included Mark Goodacre, Joan E. Taylor, John Cleese, James Tabor and Dan McClellan

== Reception ==
Bond's work has been praised by various scholars, including Craig Keener, Chris Keith, Joan E. Taylor, and Jens Schroter. Alan Kirk demurs with her views about ancient media. (Note: Alan Kirk has questioned Bond's views about ancient media and the interaction between writing and oral tradition. He objects to the claim that the chreia found in Mark are literary constructs by the author of Mark instead of cognitive tactics for memory-based transmission of knowledge.)

== Works ==
- 1998: Pontius Pilate in History and Interpretation
- 2004: Caiaphas: Friend of Rome and Judge of Jesus?
- 2007: Israel's God and Rebecca's Children: Christology and Community in Early Judaism and Christianity
- 2012: The Historical Jesus: A Guide for the Perplexed
- 2018: Jesus: A Very Brief History
- 2020: The Bible on TV
- 2020: The First Biography of Jesus: Genre and Meaning in Mark's Gospel
