= Marcus Antonius Julianus =

1st century Roman procurator of Judea

Procurator of Judaea
- In office 66–70
- Preceded by: Gessius Florus
- Succeeded by: Sextus Vettulenus Cerialis

Personal details
- Relations: Antonius Felix

Marcus Antonius Julianus was a Roman administrator who served as the 8th procurator of Judaea from 66 to 70. He might have been related to Antonius Felix, a previous procurator of Judaea, and might have written a historical work that was later used by Tacitus and Sulpicius Severus. He replaced the previous procurator and attempted to suppress the Jewish revolt during the First Jewish–Roman War, but was unsuccessfully until the arrival of Vespasian and Titus.

== Sources ==
The 1st century AD historian Josephus wrote about Marcus Antonius Julianus.

== Early life ==
Julianus might have been a relative of Antonius Felix, who served as procurator of Judaea from 52 to 60 AD.

== Career ==
Gessius Florus, the procurator of Judaea, was unable to suppress an uprising by the Jewish population; this uprising later turned into the First Jewish–Roman War. Julianus replaced Florus as procurator. Julianus was also unable to suppress the revolt and it continued until Vespasian and Titus ended the war in 70 AD. Julianus was a member of a council formed by Titus to determine the fate of the Second Temple after the Roman victory in the Siege of Jerusalem. According to Josephus, Titus chose to not destroy the temple, but a Roman soldier destroyed the it.

Jakob Bernays argued in the 19th century that the 4th century writer Sulpicius Severus wrote his historical account using a lost portion of the Histories by 1st century AD historian Tacitus, who himself used a lost literary work by Marcus Antonius Julianus. Marcus Minucius Felix referred to a work by Julianus.

== Works cited ==
=== Books ===
- Goodman, Martin (2019). Josephus's The Jewish War: A Biography. Princeton University Press. ISBN 9780691194196.
- Katz, Steven, ed. (2018). The Cambridge History of Judaism. Vol. 4. Cambridge University Press. ISBN 9781139055130.

=== Journals ===
- Schwartz, Daniel (1987). "On Abraham Schalit, Herod, Josephus, the Holocaust, Horst R. Moehring, and the Study of Ancient Jewish History". Jewish History. 2 (2). Springer Nature: 9–28. doi:10.2307/20101041. JSTOR 20101041.

=== Web ===
- Lendering, Jona. "Severus, Julius". Livius. Archived from the original on 7 November 2026.

Political offices
Preceded by Gessius Florus	Procurator of Judea; 66–70	Succeeded by Sextus Vettulenus Cerialis
