= Judaea (Roman province) =

Province of the Roman Empire (6–135 AD)

Province of Judaea Provincia Iudaea (Latin) Ἐπαρχία Ιουδαίας (Koine Greek) מְדִינְתָּא יְהוּד (Imperial Aramaic)
- Province of the Roman Empire
- 6 AD–135 AD
- The Roman Empire under the reign of Hadrian (125 AD) with Judaea highlighted in red
- Capital: Caesarea Maritima
- Area
  - Coordinates: 32°30′N 34°54′E
- Government
- Prefects before 41, Procurators after 44 AD
  - 6–9 AD: Coponius
  - 26–36 AD: Pontius Pilate
  - 64–66 AD: Gessius Florus
  - 117 AD: Lusius Quietus
  - 130–132 AD: Tineius Rufus
- King of the Jews
  - 41–44 AD: Agrippa I
  - 48–93/100: Agrippa II
- Legislature: Synedrion/Sanhedrin
- Historical era: Roman Palestine
  - Annexation to the Roman Empire: 6 AD
  - Crucifixion of Jesus: c. 30/33 AD
  - Crisis under Caligula: 37–41 AD
  - Incorporation of Galilee and Peraea: 44 AD
  - Destruction of the Second Temple: 70 AD
  - Assigned a governor of praetorian rank and given the 10th Legion: c. 74 AD
  - Renamed Syria Palaestina: 135 AD
Preceded by	Succeeded by
Herodian tetrarchy	Syria Palaestina
- Today part of: Israel; Palestine; Jordan (Peraea); Lebanon (NW Galilee)
- Form of Judaism: before August 70, it is referred to as Second Temple Judaism, from which the Tannaim and Early Christianity emerged.

Judaea (Note: Latin: Iudaea [juːˈdae̯.a]; Ancient Greek: Ἰουδαία, romanized: Ioudaía [i.uˈdɛ.a].) was a Roman province from 6 to 135 AD, which at its height encompassed the regions of Judea, Idumea, Peraea, Samaria, and Galilee, as well as parts of the coastal plain of the southern Levant. At its height, it encompassed much of the core territories of the former Kingdom of Judaea, which had been ruled by the Hasmonean and Herodian dynasties in previous decades. The name Judaea (like the similar Judea) derives from the Iron Age Kingdom of Judah, which was centered in the region of Judea.

Since the Roman Republic's conquest of Judaea in 63 BC, which abolished the independent Hasmonean monarchy, Rome maintained a system of semi-autonomous vassalage in the region. After Hasmonean ruler Antigonus II Mattathias briefly regained the throne, he was overthrown by Herod, who was appointed King of the Jews by the Roman Senate and ruled Judaea until his death in 4 BC. The province's formal incorporation into the Roman Empire was enacted by Augustus in 6 AD following an appeal by the populace against the misrule of Herod's son, Herod Archelaus (r. 4 BC – AD 6). The administrative capital was relocated from Jerusalem to the coastal city of Caesarea Maritima.

Over the six decades following the province's establishment, relations between the majority Jewish population and Roman authorities were marked by frequent crises. With the onset of direct rule, the official census instituted by Publius Sulpicius Quirinius, the governor of Roman Syria, caused tensions and led to an uprising by Jewish rebel Judas of Galilee (6 AD). Other notable events in the region include the crucifixion of Jesus c. 30–33 AD (which led to the emergence of Christianity) and in 37 AD Emperor Caligula ordered the erection of a statue of himself in the Second Temple. A brief respite came under Agrippa I (r. 41–44 AD), a popular ruler who temporarily restored Jewish self-governance under Roman auspices. However, after his death, Judaea—now encompassing Galilee and Peraea—reverted to direct Roman rule, and unrest gradually escalated. In the following years, prophetic figures sought to gain followers, Sicarii assassins targeted officials, and corrupt and brutal governors—most notably Gessius Florus (r. 64–66 AD) further inflamed tensions.

In 66 AD, unrest in Caesarea, followed by clashes in Jerusalem, ignited the First Jewish–Roman War. The Romans, under Vespasian and later his son Titus, systematically crushed the rebellion, culminating in the razing of Jerusalem and the destruction of the Second Temple in 70 AD. The Jewish population recovered within a generation and, in 132 AD, launched the Bar Kokhba Revolt in response to Hadrian's plans to construct Aelia Capitolina, a Roman colony dedicated to Jupiter, on the ruins of Jerusalem. The rebels briefly established an independent Jewish state, but the Roman suppression of the revolt in 135–136 resulted in the widespread destruction and near-depopulation of the region of Judea. At that point, Judea was officially renamed Syria Palaestina.

== Background ==
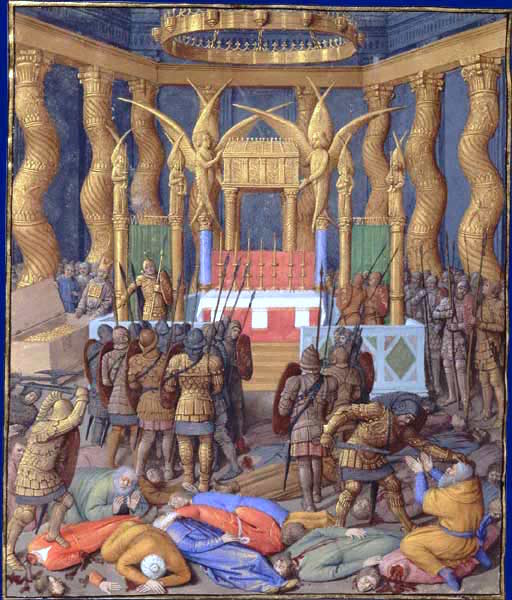
Pompey in the Temple of Jerusalem, by Jean Fouquet

Judaea, an independent state under the Hasmonean dynasty, was conquered by the Roman Republic in 63 BCE. At the time, it was embroiled in a civil war between Hyrcanus II and Aristobulus II, sons of Queen Salome Alexandra, both vying for the throne. Roman general Pompey intervened, besieging and capturing Jerusalem. In the aftermath, he appointed Hyrcanus II as ethnarch and High Priest, but denied him the title of king.

In 40 BCE, Antigonus II Mattathias, son of Aristobolus II, temporarily reclaimed the throne with Parthian support but was overthrown in 37 BCE by Herod, whom the Roman Senate had appointed "King of the Jews." Herod ruled Judaea as a client kingdom of Rome until his death in 4 BCE. Widely despised and resented by the public, he maintained close relations with the Romans. During this period, the remaining Hasmonean heirs were eliminated, and the grand port city of Caesarea Maritima was constructed.

Herod died in 4 BCE, and his kingdom was partitioned into a tetrarchy and divided among three of his sons. Archelaus served as ethnarch of Judea (including Jerusalem), Samaria, and Idumaea, while Herod Antipas governed Galilee and Peraea, and Philip ruled over Gaulanitis, Trachonitis and Batanaea. Archelaus' rule of Judea was so gravely atrocious that he was dismissed in 6 CE by the first Roman emperor, Augustus, after an appeal from his own subjects. Following his removal, Judaea was annexed as the Roman province of Judaea. Herod Antipas continued to rule Galilee and Peraea until his dismissal by Emperor Caligula in 39 CE.

== Geography ==
The territories of the Herodian tetrarchy, including those of Herod Archelaus, which became the Roman province of Judaea

When Judaea became a Roman province in 6 CE, its territory corresponded to the domains previously ruled by Herod Archelaus under the Herodian tetrarchy, which comprised the districts of Judea, Samaria, and Idumaea, including major urban centers such as Jerusalem, Caesarea Maritima, Sebaste, and Joppa. After 44 CE, when direct Roman rule was restored following the reign of Herod Agrippa I, the province was expanded to include Galilee and Peraea.

The New Testament reflects a province divided among Jews, Samaritans and Gentiles.

== History ==
=== Revolt and removal of Herod Archelaus ===
Following the death of Herod the Great, the Herodian Kingdom of Judea was divided into the Herodian Tetrarchy, jointly ruled by Herod's sons and sister: Herod Archelaus (who ruled Judea, Samaria and Idumea), Herod Philip (who ruled Batanea, Trachonitis as well as Auranitis), Herod Antipas (who ruled Galilee and Peraea) and Salome I (who briefly ruled Jamnia).

A messianic revolt erupted in Judea in 4 BCE because of Archelaus's incompetence; the revolt was brutally crushed by the Legate of Syria, Publius Quinctilius Varus, who occupied Jerusalem and crucified 2,000 Jewish rebels.

Because of his failure to properly rule Judea, Archelaus was removed from his post by Emperor Augustus in 6 CE, while Judea, Samaria, and Idumea came under direct Roman administration.

This event had significant and ever-lasting effects on Jewish history, and the development of Christianity.

=== Under a prefect (6–41 CE) ===
Map of Judaea Roman Province (6–41 CE)

The Judean province did not initially include Galilee, Gaulanitis (today's Golan), nor Peraea or the Decapolis. Its revenue was of little importance to the Roman treasury; however, it controlled the land and coastal sea routes to the "bread basket" of Egypt and was a buffer against the Parthian Empire. The capital was moved from Jerusalem to Caesarea Maritima.

Augustus appointed Publius Sulpicius Quirinius to the post of Legate of Syria and he conducted a tax census of Syria and Judea in 6 CE, which triggered the revolt of Judas of Galilee; the revolt was quickly crushed by Quirinius.

Judea was not a senatorial province, nor an imperial province, but instead was a "satellite of Syria" governed by a prefect who was a knight of the Equestrian Order (as was that of Roman Egypt), not a former consul or praetor of senatorial rank. Quirinius appointed Coponius as first prefect of Judea. The prefect inherited the Herodian military forces, consisting of one cavalry unit and five infantry cohorts. (Note: These units, named Kaisareis and Sebastenoi, were likely recruited from the non-Jewish communities in Caesarea, Sebaste, and the surrounding regions.)

Still, Jews living in the province maintained some form of independence and could judge offenders by their own laws, including capital offenses, until c. 28 CE. Judea in the early Roman period was divided into five administrative districts with centers in Jerusalem, Gadara, Amathus, Jericho, and Sepphoris.

In 30–33 CE, Roman prefect Pontius Pilate had Jesus of Nazareth crucified on the charge of sedition, an act that led to the birth of Christianity. In 36 CE another messianic revolt erupted near Mount Gerizim, under the lead of a Samaritan, and was quickly crushed by Pilate; the Samaritans complained against Pilate's brutality to the Legate of Syria Lucius Vitellius the Elder, who removed Pilate from his post and sent him to Rome to account, replacing him with an acting prefect called Marcellus.

In 37 CE, Emperor Caligula ordered the erection of a statue of himself in the Temple in Jerusalem, a demand in conflict with Jewish monotheism. The Legate of Syria, Publius Petronius, fearing civil war if the order was carried out, delayed implementing it for nearly a year. King Herod Agrippa I finally convinced Caligula to reverse the order. Caligula later issued a second order to have his statue erected in the Temple of Jerusalem, but he was murdered before the statue reached Jerusalem and his successor Claudius rescinded the order. The "Crisis under Caligula" has been proposed as the first open break between Rome and Jews.

=== Autonomy under Herod Agrippa (41–44) ===
Between 41 and 44 AD, Judea regained its nominal autonomy, when Herod Agrippa was made King of the Jews by the emperor Claudius, thus in a sense restoring the Herodian dynasty. Claudius had allowed procurators, who served as personal agents to the Emperor and often as provincial tax and finance ministers, to be elevated to governing magistrates with full state authority to keep the peace. He may have elevated Judea's procurator to imperial governing status because the imperial legate of Syria was not sympathetic to the Judeans.

=== Under a procurator (44–66) ===
Following Agrippa's death in 44, the province returned to direct Roman control, incorporating Agrippa's personal territories of Galilee and Peraea, under a row of procurators. Nevertheless, Agrippa's son, Agrippa II was designated King of the Jews in 48. He was the seventh and last of the Herodians.

Jerusalem was plagued by famine between 44 and 48. According to Josephus, Helena of Adiabene"...went down to the city Jerusalem, her son conducting her on her journey a great way. Now her coming was of very great advantage to the people of Jerusalem; for whereas a famine did oppress them at that time, and many people died for want of what was necessary to procure food withal, queen Helena sent some of her servants to Alexandria with money to buy a great quantity of corn, and others of them to Cyprus, to bring a cargo of dried figs. And as soon as they were come back, and had brought those provisions, which was done very quickly, she distributed food to those that were in want of it, and left a most excellent memorial behind her of this benefaction, which she bestowed on our whole nation. And when her son Izates was informed of this famine, he sent great sums of money to the principal men in Jerusalem.

=== First Jewish–Roman War (66–70) ===
In 66 CE, tensions in Judaea escalated into an open revolt following clashes between Jews and Greeks in Caesarea. These were followed by the Roman procurator Florus' seizure of Temple funds in Jerusalem and his subsequent massacres of its population. A Temple captain halted sacrifices for the emperor, and the Roman garrison in the city was massacred. In response, Cestius Gallus, the Roman governor of Syria, led a 30,000-strong army into Judaea and besieged Jerusalem. However, after withdrawing from the city for unclear reasons, his forces suffered a devastating ambush at the Bethoron Pass.

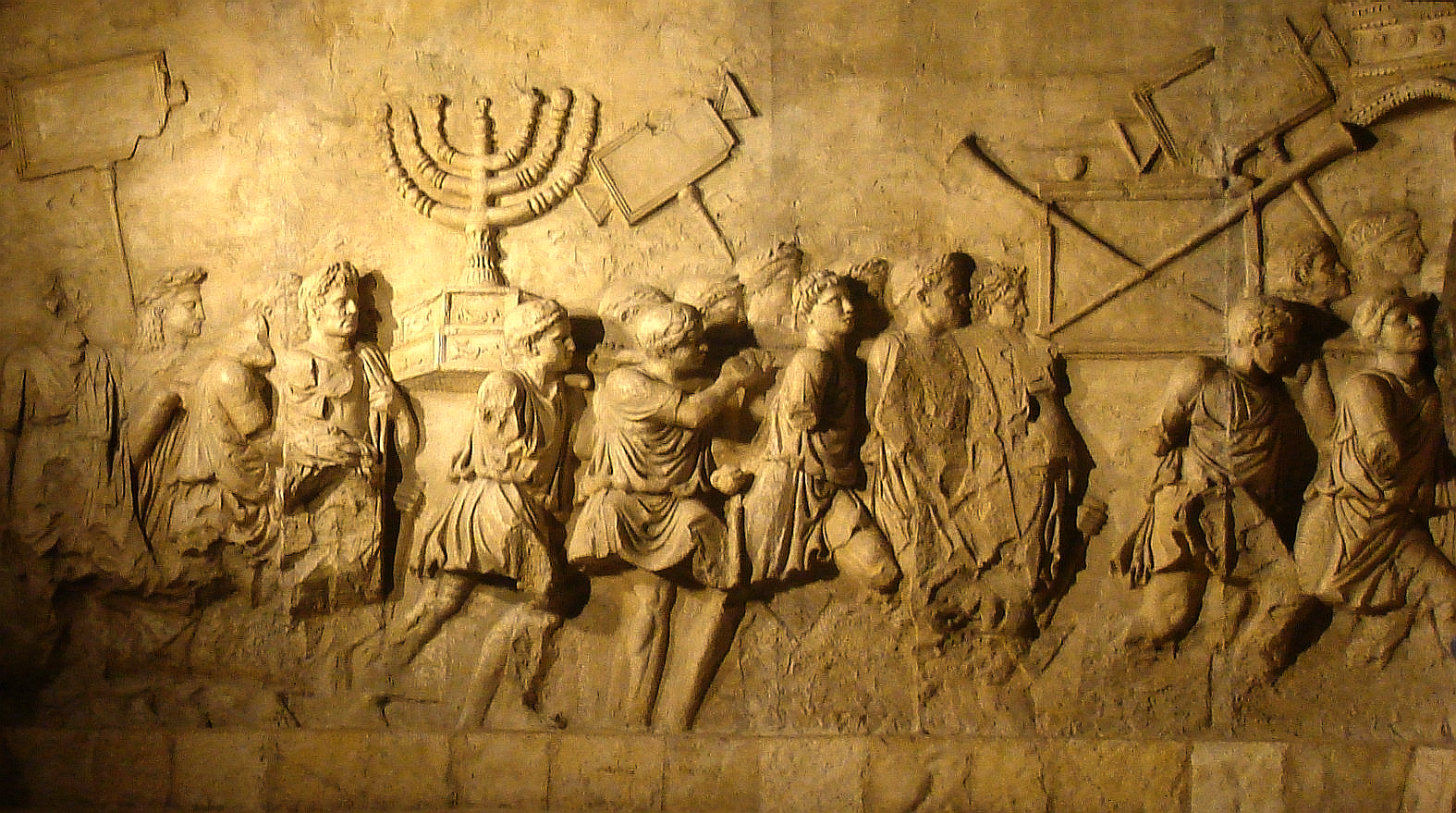
The spoils of the Jerusalem Temple, carried in triumph after the First Jewish–Roman War, as depicted on the Arch of Titus

After Gallus' defeat, a provisional government was formed in Jerusalem, appointing military commanders across the country. Soon Emperor Nero tasked Vespasian with suppressing the revolt, and in 67 CE, he launched a campaign in Galilee, besieging and destroying rebel strongholds such as Yodfat, Tarichaea, and Gamla. Meanwhile, Jerusalem became overcrowded with refugees and rebels. Inside the city, internal Jewish factions clashed as Zealots seized power, overthrew the moderate government, and invited the Idumeans, who massacred opposition leaders and consolidated their control. By 68 CE, Vespasian had secured Galilee and parts of Judea, aiming to isolate Jerusalem. However, Nero's suicide in 68 CE plunged Rome into civil war (the "Year of the Four Emperors"). In 69 CE, Vespasian was proclaimed emperor and left for Rome, entrusting command to his son Titus, who prepared to crush the remaining Jewish resistance.

In 70 CE, the Roman army under Titus laid a five-month siege to Jerusalem. Titus's forces comprised legions, along with detachments (vexillationes) from two other legions, twenty infantry cohorts, eight mounted alae, and thousands of troops provided by client kings, totaling around 50,000 soldiers. Jerusalem population had swollen with Passover pilgrims and refugees, while three-way factional strife among Jewish groups further weakened its defense. As supplies dwindled, the inhabitants suffered from starvation and disease. The Romans breached the city walls one by one, and, in the summer, stormed the Temple Mount, destroying the Second Temple. The following month, the Romans completed their conquest of Jerusalem, slaughtering, enslaving, or executing many of its inhabitants and reducing the city to ruins.

In the years that followed, Roman forces launched a final campaign against isolated rebel-held fortresses, which concluded with the fall of Masada in 73/74 CE.

=== Interwar period (70–132) ===
The Jewish defeat in the First Jewish–Roman War left a lasting impact on Judaea. Jerusalem, the spiritual and national center of the Jewish people, was destroyed, and large numbers of Jews were killed through war, famine, disease, and massacres, while many others were captured or displaced. Nevertheless, communal life gradually recovered, and Jews continued to make up a relative majority of the population.

In the aftermath, the province underwent administrative reorganization. A senatorial-rank legate was appointed as governor, and Legio X Fretensis, which had taken part in the conquest of Jerusalem, was permanently stationed in the city's ruins. To strengthen Roman control, the regions of Judea and Idumaea were designated a military zone under legionary officers, and veterans as well as other Roman citizens settled in the province.

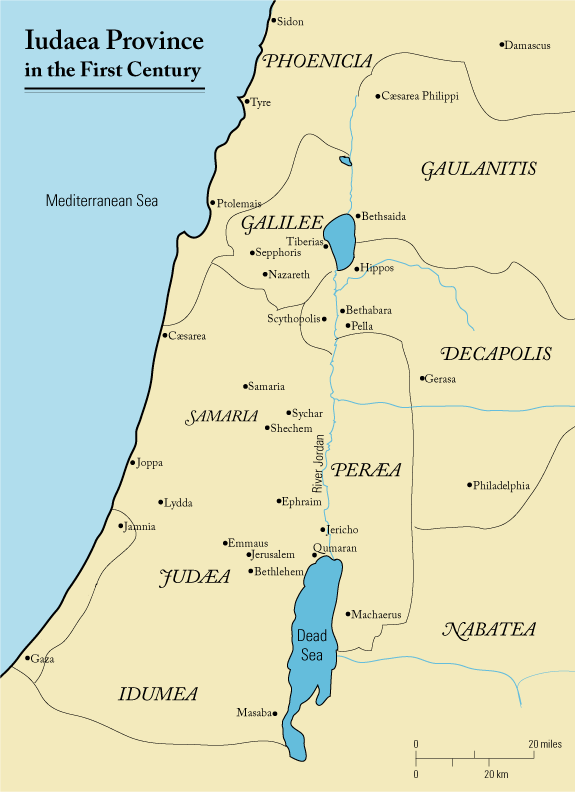
First century Iudaea province

In 115 CE, widespread Jewish uprisings, known as the Diaspora Revolt, erupted almost simultaneously across several eastern provinces, including Cyprus, Egypt, Libya, and Mesopotamia. Suppression of the revolt took about two years and led to the near-total destruction of Jewish communities in Cyprus, Egypt, and Libya. Judaea's involvement remains disputed: no fully reliable source confirms its direct participation, and archaeologically it is difficult to distinguish any destruction dating to 117 CE from that of the Bar Kokhba revolt a decade and a half later. Rabbinic tradition, however, preserves a memory of the "Kitos War," placing it fifty-two years after the destruction of the Second Temple and sixteen years before the Bar Kokhba revolt, and associating it with restrictive decrees and a ban on teaching Greek. Late Syriac sources also speak of unrest in Judaea, describing Roman defeats of Jews from Egypt and Libya there, while an inscription from Sardinia refers to an expeditio Judaeae among Trajan's campaigns. Hostilities may have been stoked by Roman cult acts in Jerusalem: Hippolytus reports that a legion under Trajan set up an idol called Kore, while an inscription records soldiers of Legio III Cyrenaica dedicating an altar or statue to Serapis in the city during Trajan's final year.

Following his role in suppressing Jewish unrest in the eastern provinces, Lusius Quietus (namesake of the Kitos War) briefly governed Judaea with consular authority. After Hadrian succeeded Trajan in 117, Quietus was dismissed and replaced by Marcus Titius Lustricus Bruttianus. Judaea's status was upgraded from a praetorian to a consular province, and a second permanent legion, Legio II Traiana Fortis, was stationed there before 120 CE. The legion's soldiers constructed a new road linking Caparcotna, Sepphoris and Acre, turning Caparcotna into a northern base and securing the corridor between Judaea, Galilee, Egypt, and Syria. To strengthen control, Rome settled veterans and other loyal colonists in Judaea, a policy that aimed to secure the province but intensified alienation from the Jewish population.

The Roman Empire in the time of Hadrian (ruled 117–138 CE), showing, in western Asia, the Roman province of Judea

=== Bar Kokhba Revolt (132–136) ===
In 132 CE, the Bar Kokhba Revolt—the final major Jewish revolt and last organized effort to regain national independence—erupted in Judaea. It was primarily concentrated in Judea proper (Note: The region encompassing the Judaean Hills, the Judean Lowlands, and the Judaean Desert) and was led by Simon bar Kokhba. The revolt was directly precipitated by the establishment of Aelia Capitolina, a pagan Roman colony, atop the ruins of Jerusalem,—an act Goodman described as the "final solution for Jewish rebelliousness." The many hiding complexes built before the revolt show that the Jews had been preparing for conflict in advance. With early victories over the Romans, Bar Kokhba secured control over a Jewish state and minted coins bearing symbols and slogans proclaiming Jewish independence, similar to those issued during the revolt. However, Roman forces under Emperor Hadrian eventually crushed the revolt, resulting in widespread destruction and mass slaughter, which some historians describe as genocidal. The fall of Betar and the death of Bar Kokhba in 135 marked the final collapse of the revolt. Judea proper was heavily depopulated, with many Jews sold into slavery and transported to distant regions.

While Hadrian's death in 137 eased some of the restrictions and persecution, the Jewish population in the region was severely reduced. The remaining Jews were largely concentrated in the Galilee, the Golan, and coastal plain cities, with smaller communities along the fringes of Judea proper and a few other areas.

=== Aftermath ===
After the revolt, Hadrian imposed laws targeting Jewish practices with the goal of dismantling Jewish nationalism. The revolt also sealed the fate of the Jerusalem Temple, preventing its rebuilding for the foreseeable future. Hadrian's punishment also included banning Jews from Jerusalem and its surrounding areas, and renaming the province from Judaea to Syria Palaestina.

The creation of Syria Palaestina from the ruins of Judaea, the former of which had not been an officially used name until then, did not prevent the Jewish people from referring to the land in their writings as either "Yehudah" (Hebrew: יהודה) or "The Land of Israel" (Hebrew: ארץ ישראל).

== Economy ==
=== Agriculture ===
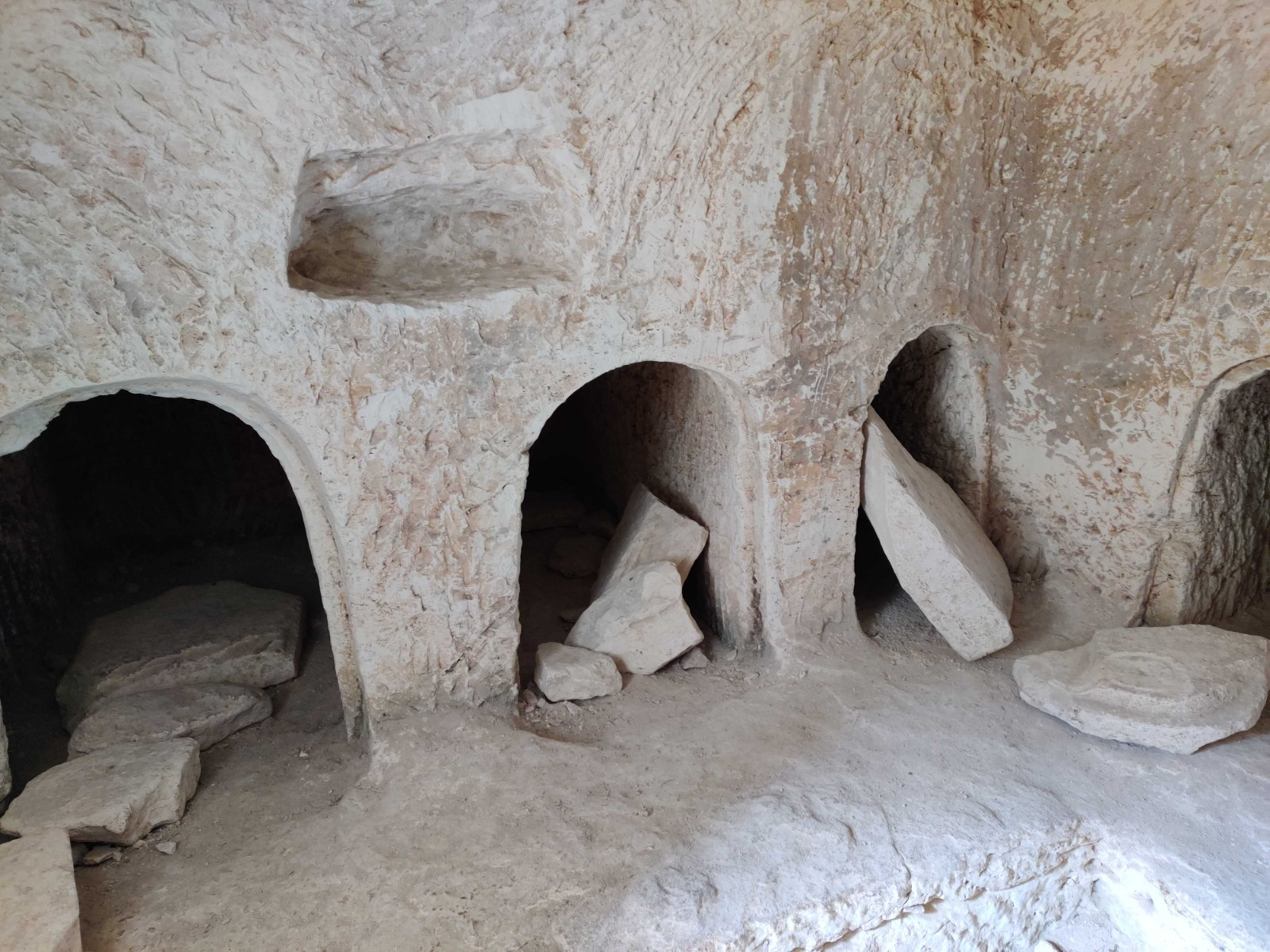
A rock-cut Jewish tomb at Horvat Borgin, dating from the late first century BCE to the Bar Kokhba Revolt

Agriculture played a significant role in economic life in Judaea. Wheat, barley, olives and grapes were the main crops grown in Judaea's fields. Evidence for the cultivation of herbs, vegetables, and legumes comes from Rabbinic literature, Josephus' works, and the New Testament. Writings from the late first and early second centuries indicate that Jewish farmers introduced rice to Judea during the early Roman period. The local crop was fine, large-kernel rice.

=== Coinage ===
During the Roman administration of Judaea, some governors commissioned the minting of coins for local use. Only six governors are known to have issued such coins, all minted in Jerusalem. All issues minted were prutot, small bronze coins averaging 2-2.5 grams, similar to the Roman quadrans.

The design of the coins reflects an attempt to accommodate Jewish sensibilities, likely in collaboration with the Jewish leadership in Jerusalem. Unlike typical Roman coinage featuring the emperor's portrait, these coins displayed symbols like palm tree and ears of grain, echoing earlier Hasmonean and Herodian designs. A notable exception is the coinage of Pontius Pilate, (26-36 CE), which included Roman cultic items like the simpulum and lituus on one side, though the reverse maintained Jewish imagery.

Attributing these coins to specific governors is a challenge. They lack the governor's name, but display the reigning emperor's regnal year and name in Greek. Scholars rely on cross-referencing this information with historical records, particularly the writings of Josephus, to establish a governor's chronology and assign the coins accordingly.

These coins were primarily circulated within Judaea, with the highest concentration found in Jerusalem, where hundreds have been discovered. However, evidence indicates that the coins transcended their intended region, with discoveries in Transjordan and even in distant locations like Dura and Antioch.

The minting of provincial coins ceased in 59 CE, and they continued to circulate until the end of the First Jewish–Roman War in 70 CE. Following the destruction of Jerusalem and its temple, Jews lost their previously held rights; subsequent Roman coinage in Judaea no longer reflected Jewish influence.

== List of governors (6–135 AD) ==
Name	Reign	Length of rule	Category
Coponius	6–9	3	Roman Prefect
Marcus Ambivulus	9–12	3	Roman Prefect
Annius Rufus	12–15	3	Roman Prefect
Valerius Gratus	15–26 (?)	11	Roman Prefect
Pontius Pilate	26–36 (?)	10	Roman Prefect
Marcellus	36–37	1	Roman Prefect
Marullus	37–41	4	Roman Prefect
Vacant	41–44	3	Monarchy restored
Cuspius Fadus	44–46	2	Roman Procurator
Tiberius Julius Alexander	46–48	2	Roman Procurator
Ventidius Cumanus	48–52	4	Roman Procurator
Marcus Antonius Felix	52–60	8	Roman Procurator
Porcius Festus	60–62	2	Roman Procurator
Lucceius Albinus	62–64	2	Roman Procurator
Gessius Florus	64–66	2	Roman Procurator
Marcus Antonius Julianus	66–70 (dates uncertain)	4	Roman Procurator
Sextus Vettulenus Cerialis	70–71	1	Roman Legate
Sextus Lucilius Bassus	71–72	1	Roman Legate
Lucius Flavius Silva	72–81	9	Roman Legate
Marcus Salvidienus	80–85	5	Roman Legate
Gnaeus Pompeius Longinus	c.86	1	Roman Legate
Sextus Hermentidius Campanus	c.93	1	Roman Legate
Tiberius Claudius Atticus Herodes	99–102	3	Roman Legate
Gaius Julius Quadratus Bassus	102–104	2	Roman Legate
Quintus Pompeius Falco	105–107	2	Roman Legate
Tiberianus	114–117	3	Roman Legate
Lusius Quietus	117–120	3	Roman Legate
Gargilius Antiquus	c. 124–?	1	Roman Prefect
Quintus Tineius Rufus	130–132/3	3	Roman Legate
Sextus Julius Severus	c. 133/4–135	1	Roman Legate

== See also ==
- History of the Jews and Judaism in the Land of Israel
- Fiscus Judaicus – Tax imposed on Jews in the Roman Empire
- The Life of Brian – a 1979 British comedy film which riffs on the idiosyncrasies of life in 33 AD Roman Judea
- Roman Palestine

== Sources ==
=== Bibliography ===
- Bahat, Dan (1999). "The Herodian Temple". In Horbury, William; Davies, W. D.; Sturdy, John (eds.). The Early Roman Period. The Cambridge History of Judaism. Vol. 3. Cambridge University Press. pp. 38–58. ISBN 9781139053662.
- Berlin, Andrea M.; Overman, J. Andrew, eds. (2002). "Introduction". The First Jewish Revolt: Archaeology, History, and Ideology. London and New York: Routledge. ISBN 978-0-415-62024-6.
- Ben Zeev, Miriam (2018). "New Insights into Roman Policy in Judea on the Eve of the Bar Kokhba Revolt". Journal for the Study of Judaism in the Persian, Hellenistic, and Roman Period. 49 (1). Brill: 84–107. doi:10.1163/15700631-12481193. JSTOR 26551240.
- Cotton, Hannah M. (2022). Pogorelsky, Ofer (ed.). Roman Rule and Jewish Life: Collected Papers. Studia Judaica. Vol. 89. De Gruyter. doi:10.1515/9783110770438. ISBN 978-3-110-77043-8.
- Eshel, Hanan (2006). "The Bar Kochba Revolt, 132–135". In Katz, Steven T. (ed.). The Late Roman-Rabbinic Period. The Cambridge History of Judaism. Vol. 4th. Cambridge University Press. ISBN 978-0-521-77248-8.
- Gabba, Emilio (1999). "The social, economic and political history of Palestine 63 BCE–CE 70". In Horbury, William; Davies, W. D.; Sturdy, John (eds.). The Early Roman Period. The Cambridge History of Judaism. Vol. 3. Cambridge University Press. pp. 94–167. ISBN 9781139053662.
- Goodman, Martin (1987). The Ruling Class of Judaea: The Origins of the Jewish Revolt against Rome, A.D. 66–70. Cambridge University Press. doi:10.1017/CBO9780511552656. ISBN 9780511552656.
- Goodman, Martin (2004). "Trajan and the Origins of Roman Hostility to the Jews". Past & Present (182): 3–29. doi:10.1093/past/182.1.3. JSTOR 3600803.
- Herr, Moshe David (1984). "פני התקופה: ארץ-ישראל באימפריה הרומית אחרי חורבן בית שני". In Stern, Menahem (ed.). The Roman Byzantine Period: The Roman Period from the Conquest to the Ben Kozba War (63 BCE – 135 CE). The History of Eretz Israel (in Hebrew). Vol. 4. Ben-Zvi Institute. pp. 283–370.
- Horbury, William (2014). Jewish War under Trajan and Hadrian. Cambridge University Press. ISBN 978-1-139-04905-4.
- Isaac, Benjamin (1990). The Limits of Empire: The Roman Army in the East. Oxford University Press. ISBN 978-0-198-14952-1.
- Kerkeslager, Allen (2006). "The Jews in Egypt and Cyrenaica, 66–c. 235 CE". In Katz, Steven T. (ed.). The Late Roman-Rabbinic Period. The Cambridge History of Judaism. Vol. 4. Cambridge University Press. ISBN 978-0-521-77248-8.
- Levine, David (2017). "70 CE or 135 CE – Where was the Watershed? Ancient and Modern Perspectives". In Schwartz, Joshua J.; Tomson, Peter J. (eds.). Jews and Christians in the First and Second Centuries: The Interbellum 70‒132 CE. Compendia Rerum Iudaicarum ad Novum Testamentum. Vol. 15. Brill. pp. 161–175. doi:10.1163/9789004352971_011. ISBN 978-90-04-35297-1.
- Magness, Jodi (2012). The Archaeology of the Holy Land: From the Destruction of Solomon's Temple to the Muslim Conquest. Cambridge University Press. ISBN 978-1-139-01383-3.
- Magness, Jodi (2024). Jerusalem Through The Ages: From Its Beginnings To The Crusades. New York, NY: Oxford University Press. ISBN 978-0-19-093780-5.
- Mason, Steve (2016). A History of the Jewish War: AD 66–74. Key Conflicts of Classical Antiquity. Cambridge University Press. doi:10.1017/CBO9781139020718. ISBN 978-1-139-02071-8.
- Price, Jonathan J. (1992). Jerusalem under Siege: The Collapse of the Jewish State, 66-70 C.E. Brill's Series in Jewish Studies. Vol. 3. Brill. ISBN 978-9-004-09471-0.
- Price, Jonathan J. (2011). "The Jewish Population of Jerusalem from the First Century BCE to the Early Second Century CE: The Epigraphic Record". In Popović, Mladen (ed.). The Jewish Revolt against Rome: Interdisciplinary Perspectives. Brill. pp. 399–418. doi:10.1163/9789004216693_017. ISBN 978-9-004-21668-6.
- Price, Jonathan (2024). "Historiography in the Time of Stasis: Reflections on the Nationalistic Uprisings in Judea/Palestine". In Czajkowski, Kimberley; Friedman, David A. (eds.). Looking In, Looking Out: Jews and Non-Jews in Mutual Contemplation. Supplements to the Journal for the Study of Judaism. Vol. 212. Leiden and Boston: Brill. pp. 15–37. doi:10.1163/89004685055 (inactive 1 July 2025). ISBN 978-9-004-68503-1.
- Pucci Ben Zeev, Miriam (2006). "The Uprisings in the Jewish Diaspora, 116–117". In Katz, Steven T. (ed.). The Late Roman-Rabbinic Period. The Cambridge History of Judaism. Vol. 4. Cambridge: Cambridge University Press. pp. 93–104. doi:10.1017/CHOL9780521772488.005. ISBN 978-0-521-77248-8.
- Rogers, Guy MacLean (2022). For the Freedom of Zion: The Great Revolt of Jews against Romans, 66–74 CE. Yale University Press. ISBN 978-0-300-24813-5.
- Safrai, Samuel; Stern, Menachem (1974). The Jewish People in the First Century. Vol. 1. Brill. ISBN 978-9-004-27500-3.
- Safrai, Samuel (1976). "The Era of the Mishnah and Talmud (70–640)". A History of the Jewish People. Cambridge, Massachusetts: Harvard University Press. pp. 307–382. ISBN 0-674-39731-2.
- Schäfer, Peter (2003). The History of the Jews in the Greco-Roman World: The Jews of Palestine from Alexander the Great to the Arab Conquest. Routledge. ISBN 9780415305877.
- Schiffman, Lawrence H. (1991). "Revolt and Restoration". From Text to Tradition: A History of Second Temple and Rabbinic Judaism. Ktav Publishing House. ISBN 978-0-881-25372-6.
- Schwartz, Seth (2006). "Political, social, and economic life in the Land of Israel, 66–c. 235". In Katz, Steven T. (ed.). The Late Roman-Rabbinic Period. The Cambridge History of Judaism. Vol. 4. Cambridge University Press. pp. 23–52. ISBN 978-0-521-77248-8.
- Smallwood, E. Mary (1976). The Jews under Roman Rule from Pompey to Diocletian. SBL Press. ISBN 978-90-04-50204-8.
- Taylor, Joan E. (2012). The Essenes, the Scrolls, and the Dead Sea. Oxford University Press. ISBN 978-0-199-55448-5.
- Tropper, Amram (2016). Rewriting Ancient Jewish History: The History of the Jews in Roman Times and the New Historical Method. London & New York: Routledge. ISBN 978-1-138-64148-8.
- Zissu, Boaz (2018). "Interbellum Judea 70–132 ce: An Archaeological Perspective". In Schwartz, Joshua J.; Tomson, Peter J. (eds.). Jews and Christians in the First and Second Centuries: The Interbellum 70‒132 CE. Compendia Rerum Iudaicarum ad Novum Testamentum. Vol. 15. Brill. pp. 19–49. doi:10.1163/9789004352971_011. ISBN 978-90-04-35297-1.

=== Works cited ===
- Jacobson, David (2001), "When Palestine Meant Israel", Biblical Archaeology Review, 27 (3)
