= Praefectus =

Prefect in ancient Rome

Praefectus, often with a further qualification, was the formal title of many, fairly low to high-ranking, military or civil officials in the Roman Empire, whose authority was not embodied in their person (as it was with elected Magistrates) but conferred by delegation from a higher authority. They did have some authority in their prefecture, such as controlling prisons and in civil administration.

== Praetorian prefects ==
The Praetorian prefect (Praefectus praetorio) began as the military commander of a general's guard company in the field, then grew in importance as the Praetorian Guard became a potential kingmaker during the Empire. From the Emperor Diocletian's tetrarchy (c. 300) they became the administrators of the four Praetorian prefectures, the government level above the (newly created) dioceses and (multiplied) provinces.

== Police and civil prefects ==
- Praefectus urbi, or praefectus urbanus: city prefect, in charge of the administration of Rome.
- Praefectus vigilum: commander of the Vigiles (firemen and police).
- Praefectus aerarii: nobles appointed guardians of the state treasury.
- Praefectus aerarii militaris: prefect of the military treasury.
- Praefectus annonae: official charged with the supervision of the grain supply to the city of Rome.

== Military prefects ==
- Praefectus alae: commander of a cavalry unit.
- Praefectus castrorum: camp commandant.
- Praefectus cohortis: commander of a cohort (constituent unit of a legion, or analogous unit).
- Praefectus classis: fleet commander.
- Praefectus equitatus: cavalry commander.
- Praefectus equitum: cavalry commander.
- Praefectus fabrum: officer in charge of fabri, i.e. well-trained engineers and artisans.
- Praefectus legionis: equestrian legionary commander.
- Praefectus legionis agens vice legati: equestrian acting legionary commander.
- Praefectus orae maritimae: official in charge with the control and defense of an important sector of sea coast.
- Praefectus socium (sociorum): Roman officer appointed to a command function in an ala sociorum (unit recruited among the socii, Italic peoples of a privileged status within the empire) chosen from the equestrian order.

For some auxiliary troops, specific titles could even refer to their peoples:

- Praefectus Laetorum (Germanic, notably in Gaul)
- Praefectus Sarmatarum gentilium (from the steppes, notably in Italy)

== Prefects as provincial governors ==
Roman provinces were usually ruled by high-ranking officials. Less important provinces though were entrusted to prefects, military men who would otherwise only govern parts of larger provinces. The most famous example is Pontius Pilate, who governed Judaea at a time when it was administered as an annex of Syria.

As Egypt was a special imperial domain, a rich and strategic granary, where the Emperor enjoyed an almost pharaonic position unlike any other province or diocese, its head was styled uniquely Praefectus Augustalis, indicating that he governed in the personal name of the emperor, the "Augustus". Septimius Severus, after conquering Mesopotamia, introduced the same system there too.

After the mid-1st century, as a result of the Pax Romana, the governorship was gradually shifted from the military prefects to civilian fiscal officials called procurators, Egypt remaining the exception.

== Religious prefects ==
- Praefectus urbi: a prefect of the republican era who guarded the city during the annual sacrifice of the Feriae Latinae on Mount Alban in which the consuls participated. His former title was "custos urbi" ("guardian of the city").
