= Statue of Corvo =

Equestrian statue allegedly discovered on Corvo

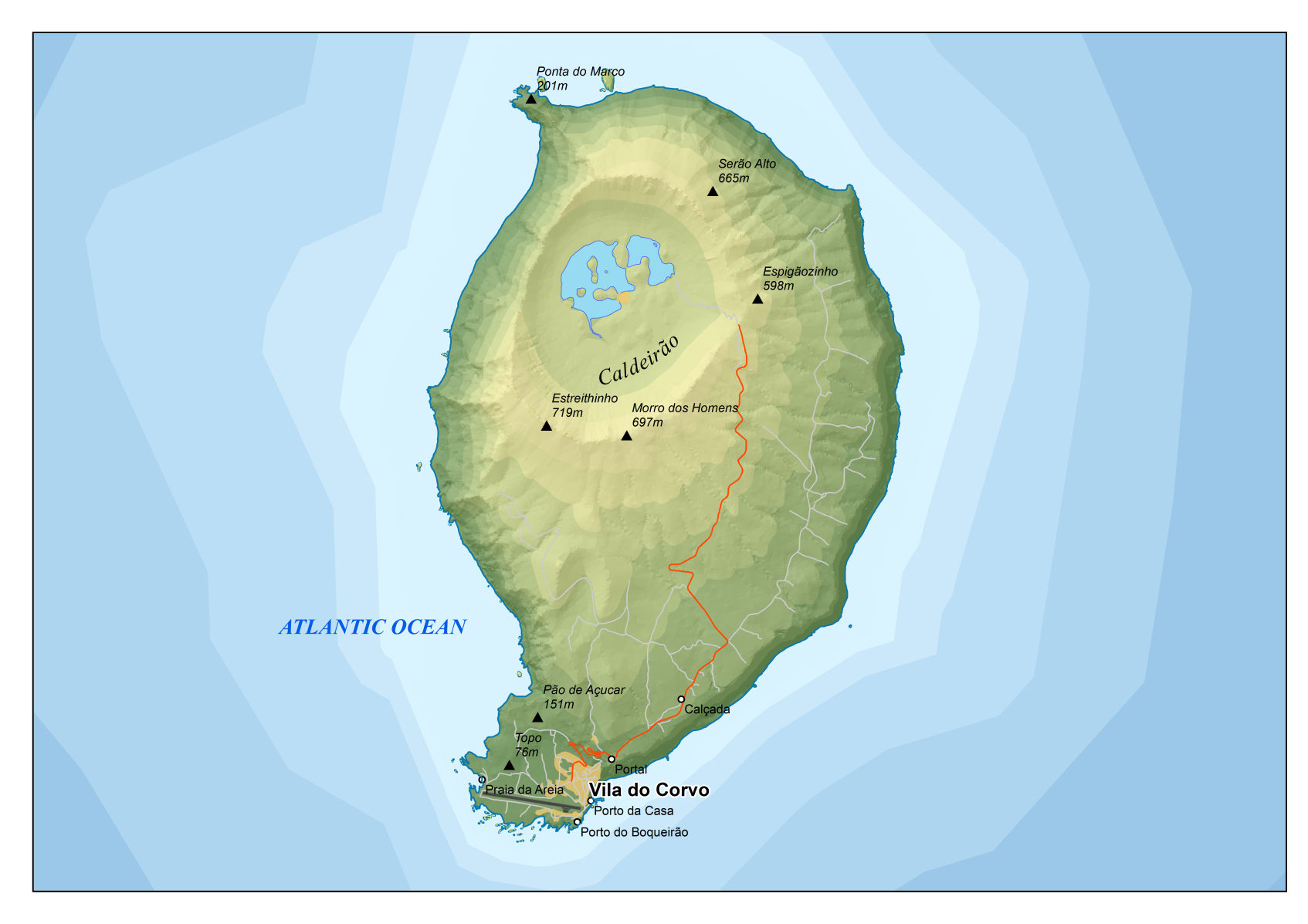
Present day map of Corvo island (Azores)

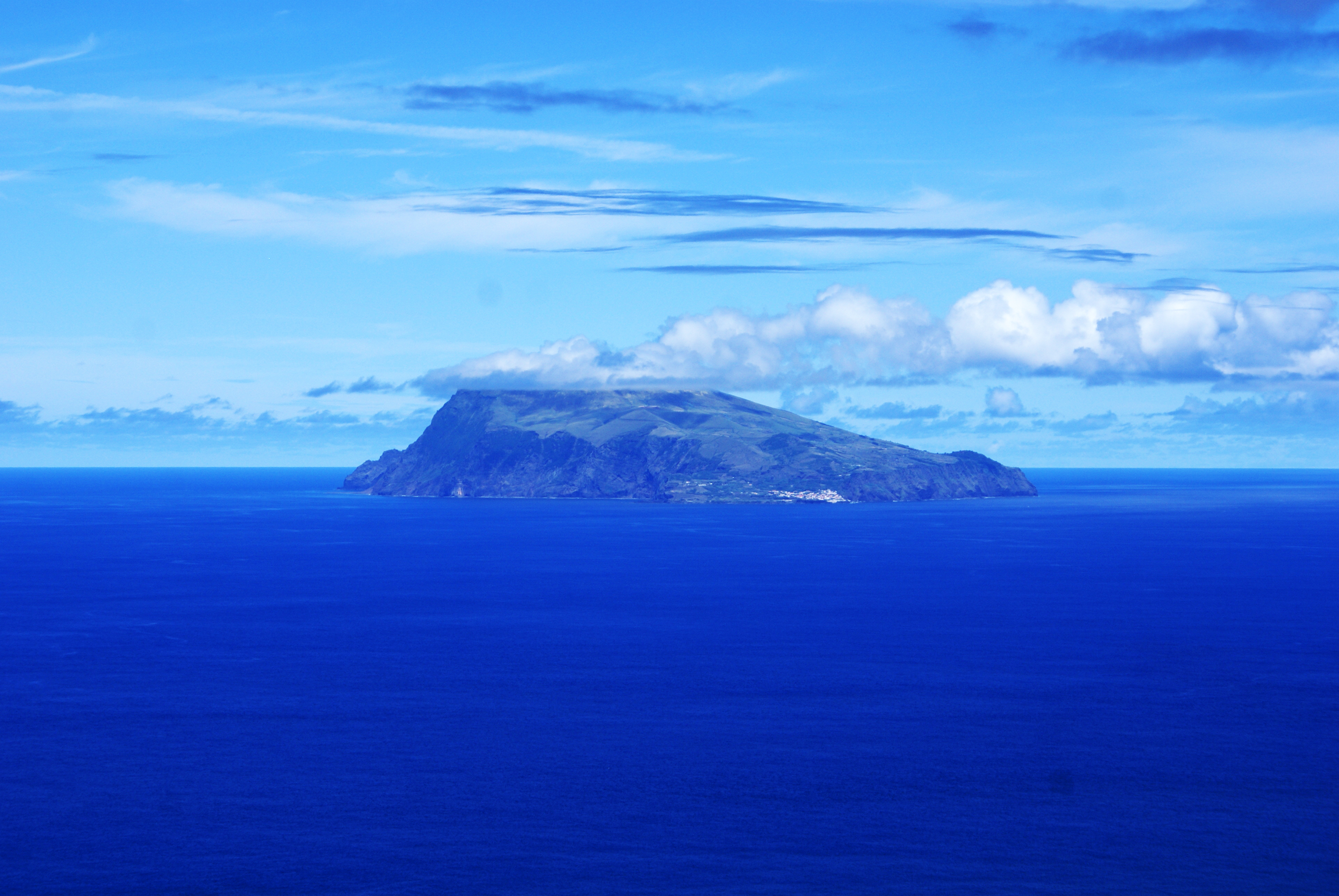
Corvo Island

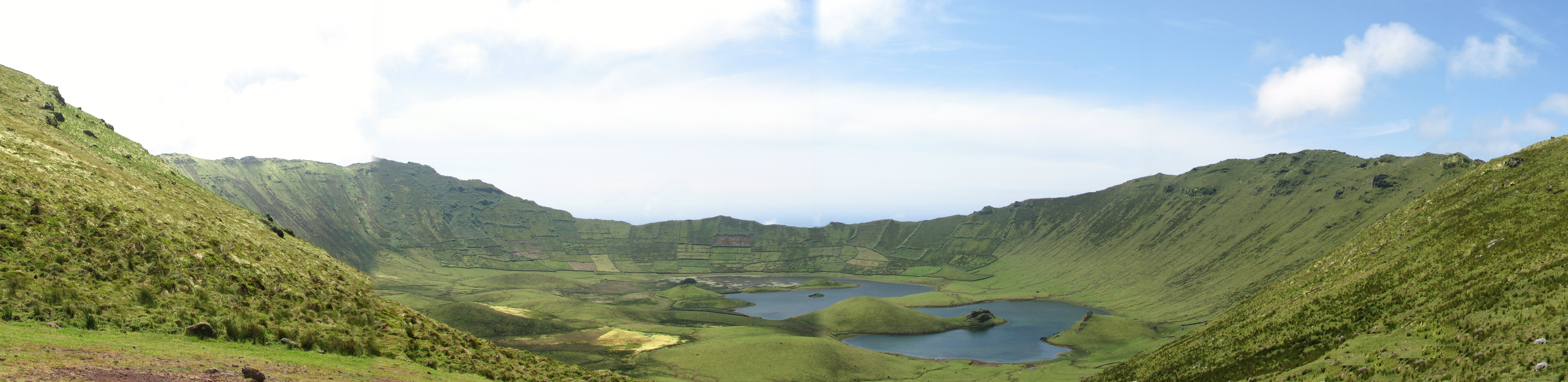
Volcanic rim of the island from the inside

The statue of Corvo was an equestrian statue which, according to Portuguese chronicles, was discovered on the island of Corvo by the first Portuguese explorers of the Azores. The statue was made of stone and was destroyed in the late 15th or early 16th century, as a result of a failed attempt to transport it to Portugal.

== Description ==
The statue was described by Damião de Góis as being in stone and standing on a slab. It depicted a man riding a horse. The man was pointing towards the west, his right arm and index finger outstretched, while his left rested on the horse's mane. The man wore a moorish tunic but no hat.

Its plinth was inscribed with worn letters in an alphabet which was unknown to the early modern sailors who visited the island.

The statue was located on the northwestern side of Corvo's mountain, in a location which de Góis describes as dangerous to access. The area was so inaccessible that in their attempts to take copies of the writing on the plinth, Portuguese sailors were forced to use ropes to reach it.

== History ==
The statue is first mentioned in de Góis's Chronicle of Prince Dom Joăo of 1567, where it is described in detail. The chronicle relates that King Manuel I sent the draftsman Duarte de Armas to make a sketch of the statue, which has not survived to the present day. Upon seeing the drawing, the king sent a man from Porto to bring the statue to Lisbon. However, by the time the statue arrived in Lisbon it was destroyed. According to de Góis this was likely caused by the attempt to move it. Only the heads of the horse and man, the right arm of the man and a foot and section of the leg remained intact. De Góis was unaware what had become of the pieces after their delivery to the king.

Pêro da Fonseca, a sea captain who was in the islands in 1529, wrote that locals had informed him that an attempt had been made to take an impression of the letters beneath the statue. Many of the letters were worn out, but wax impressions were taken of some of them, which could not be deciphered. De Góis speculated that this was because the letters were too weathered, or that those who took the impressions knew only the Latin alphabet.

Azorean priest Gaspar Frutuoso also mentioned the statue in his Saudades da Terra, repeating de Góis's story without the details of the attempt to copy the inscription.

== Origin and analysis ==
The origin of the statue is unknown and some authors consider it possible that the statue never existed.

The possibility that the Carthaginians had built the statue was first raised by Gaspar Frutuoso in the 16th century, however, Rodrigues and Costa argue that Frutuoso lacked any criteria to date the statue, even if it had existed. Isserlin, writing in 1984, suggested that the statue may have had a Carthaginian origin, and pointed out that Carthaginian gods were often depicted on horseback, especially the solar deity Ba'al Hammon.

Both Isserlin and a group from the Portuguese Association for Archaeological Investigation have associated the statue with the discovery of a trove of ancient Punic and Hellenic coins on Corvo in the 18th century. The discovery followed a severe storm in 1749 which had disturbed sediments and uncovered a black pot in a ruined structure located on the beach. Nine of the coins made their way to Swedish numismatist Johan Frans Podolyn, who identified seven of them as Carthaginian and two as being from Cyrene.

Patricia and Pierre Bikai are more skeptical of the statue's existence. They point out that a 1367 map drawn by the Pizzigano brothers shows a figure with an outstretched arm in the vicinity of Corvo. They state this figure is intended to show the limits beyond which navigation was impossible, but that this depiction gave rise to the idea that there was a statue on Corvo. They also argue that a number of natural rock formations on the island have the superficial appearance of statues, which could have contributed to the growth of the story of the statue.

Carita, writing in 2004, contradicts the viewpoint that the statue did not exist, arguing that the statue can not simply be written off as a legend given the credibility of Damião de Góis.

== See also ==
- Rampin Rider (Earliest known equestrian statue, from ancient Greece)
