= Carthaginian coinage =

Coins of ancient Carthage

Carthaginian or Punic coins were produced from the late fifth century BC through 146 BC by ancient Carthage, a Punic empire known as Rome's biggest rival located in present-day Tunis, Tunisia. A wide range of coinage was issued in gold, electrum, silver, billon, and bronze. The base denomination was the shekel, probably pronounced /səˈḳel/ in Punic. Only a minority of Carthaginian coinage was produced or used in North Africa. Instead, the majority derive from Carthage's holdings in Sardinia and western Sicily. After the Punic Wars, Carthaginian coinage was replaced by Roman currency.

== Background ==
Between the ninth and seventh centuries BC, the Phoenicians established colonies throughout the western Mediterranean, particularly in North Africa, western Sicily, Sardinia, and southern Iberia. Carthage soon became the largest of these communities, establishing particularly close economic, cultural, and political ties with Motya in western Sicily and Sulci in Sardinia.

Although coinage began to be minted by Greek communities in Sicily and Southern Italy around 540 BC, Punic communities did not begin producing coins until around 425 BC. The first Punic mints were in western Sicily, at Motya and Ṣyṣ (probably Panormus, modern Palermo). The coinage that these communities produced is known as Siculo-Punic coinage. Like the coinage produced by the Greek communities in Sicily, it was minted solely in silver on the Attic-Euboic weight standard, and its iconography was mostly adapted from other pre-existing Sicilian coinages - principally those of Himera, Segesta, and Syracuse. This Siculo-Punic coinage probably preceded Phoenicia's own Tyrian shekels, which developed c. 400 BC.

== First Carthaginian coinage (c. 410 - 390 BC) ==
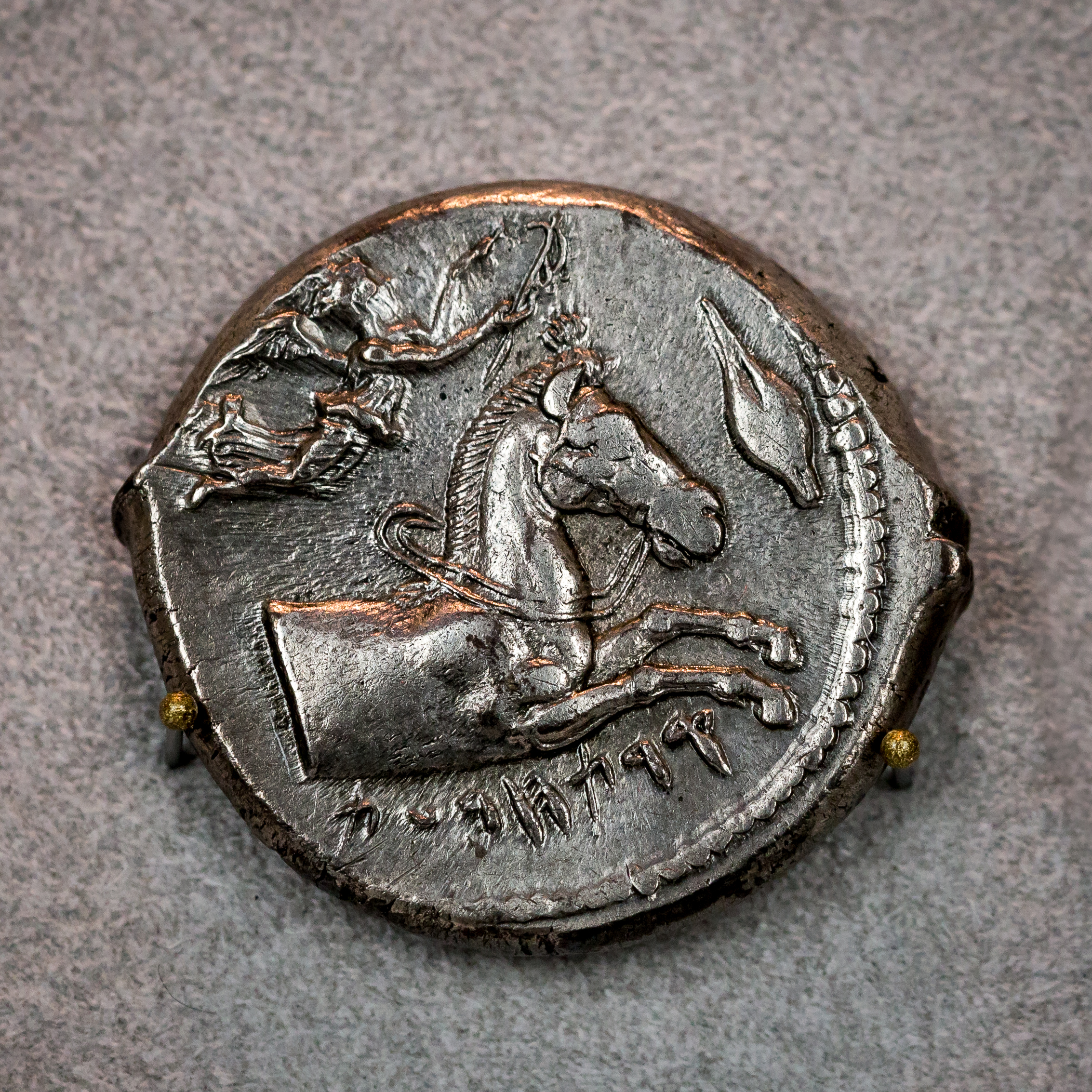
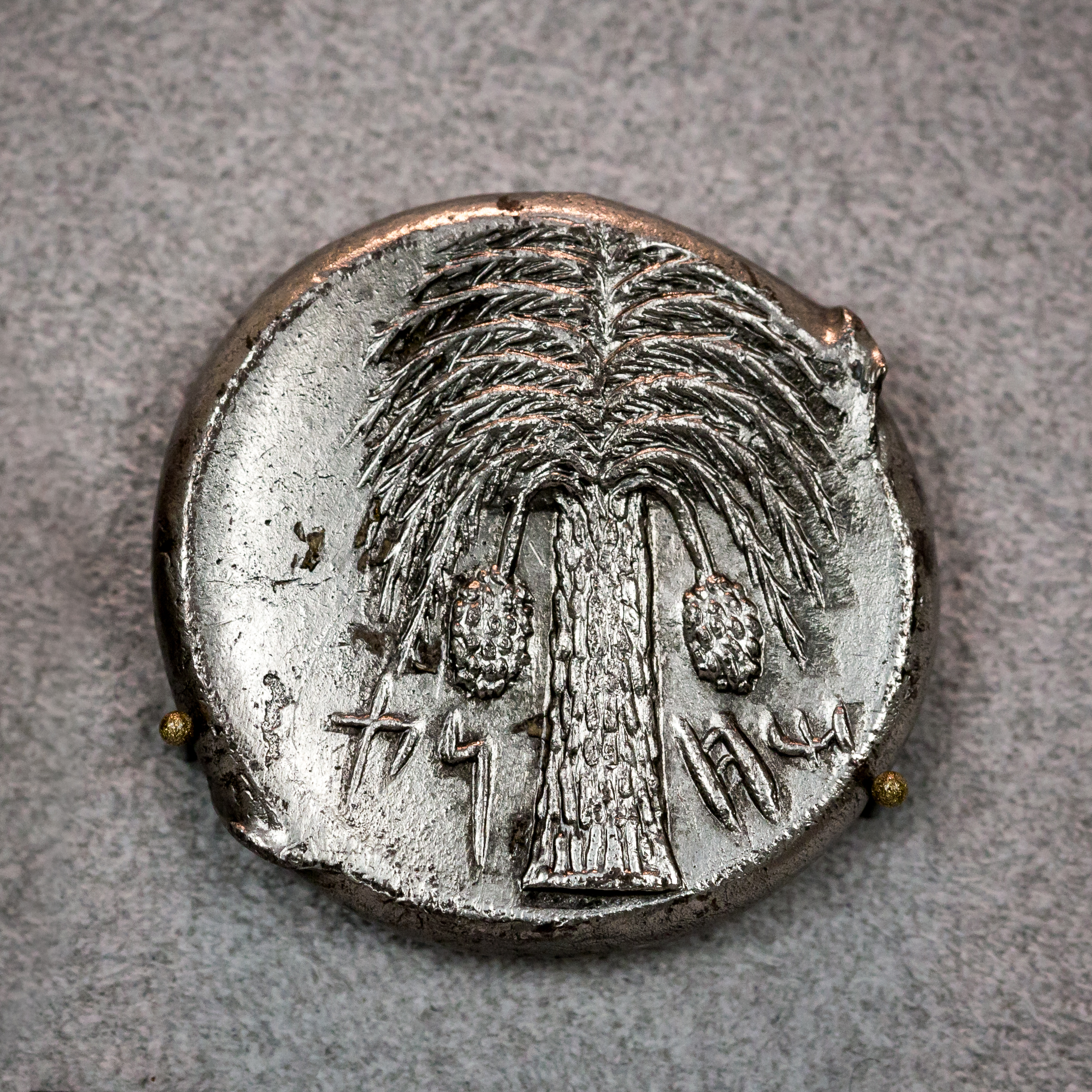
Jenkins, Series I (ca. 410-390 BC): silver tetradrachm. Altes Museum, Berlin.
Obverse: Nike flying over horse forepart facing right, grain of wheat at right, legend reads 𐤒𐤓𐤕𐤇𐤃𐤔𐤕 (QRTḤDŠT, 'Carthage').
Reverse: date palm, legend reads 𐤌𐤇𐤍𐤕 (MḤNT, 'the encampment').

The first attested Carthaginian coinage seems to have been minted in 410 or 409 BC, to pay for the massive Carthaginian military intervention in Sicily that led to the Second Sicilian War (410-404 BC) and it continued through until the end of the Third Sicilian War (398-393 BC). This coinage consisted solely of Attic weight silver tetradrachms (17.26 g), known as Series I (c. 410-390 BC), containing five separate chronological sub-groups (A-F).

The obverse of these earliest coins bears the front half of a horse facing right, with a Punic language legend reading QRTḤDŠT (𐤒𐤓𐤕𐤇𐤃𐤔𐤕, 'Carthage'). The reverse depicts a date palm tree, with the inscription MḤNT (𐤌𐤇𐤍𐤕, 'the encampment'). From sub-group B, the obverse also features a winged Nike flying over the horse, holding a caduceus and a wreath. In the final sub-group, F, the forepart of the horse is replaced with a full horse, prancing freely.

This silver coinage may have been accompanied, in its later stages, by the first Carthaginian gold coinage, known as Jenkins-Lewis, Group I. This coinage is known from a single example. It was minted as a shekel or didrachm on the Phoenician weight standard (7.20 g). Its types, a horse on the obverse and a palm tree on the reverse are very similar to those of the silver, Series I, sub-group F.

Alongside these first Carthaginian issues, separate Siculo-Punic coinages continued to be produced by other cities within the Carthaginian sphere in western Sicily, notably Motya (until 398/7 BC), Ṣyṣ-Panormus, Eryx, and Segesta.

=== Date and mint location ===
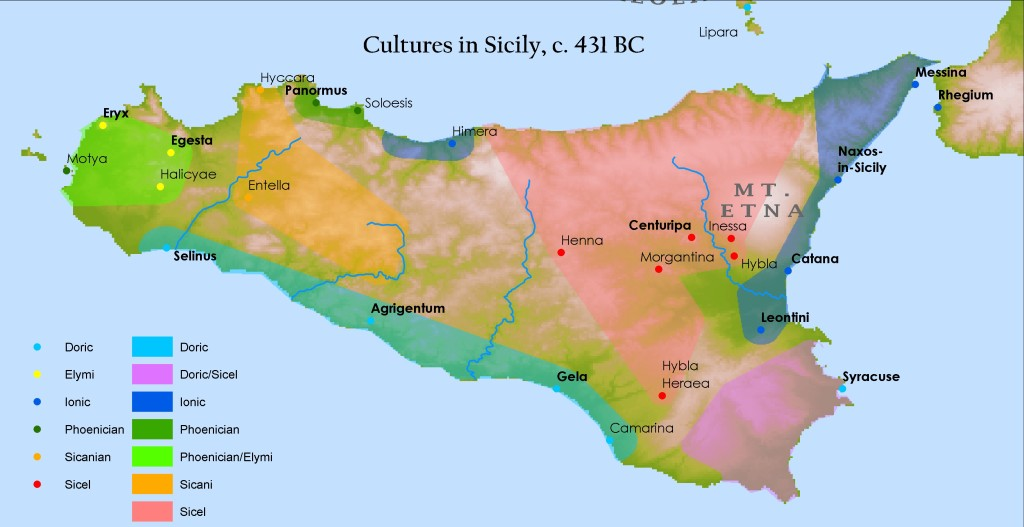
Map of Sicily in the late fifth century BC

The date of the Series I silver (c. 410-390 BC) is established by several pieces of evidence. A coin from sub-group B was overstruck by a coin of Agrigentum. Since minting activity ended at Agrigentum in 406 BC, when the Carthaginians destroyed the city, Series I (B) must have already begun to circulate before this date. The whole series had come to an end by the early 380s BC, since a selection of all the sub-groups appears in two hoards deposited at that time: Contessa and Vito Superiore (IGCH 2119 and 1910). The latter is particularly significant since the most likely occasion for its deposition is the Siege of Rhegium in 387 BC. The patterns of die linkage within the series - with a relatively high ratio of reverse dies to obverse dies and relatively few reverse dies shared by multiple obverse dies - indicate that minting was "intensive though spasmodic." Bringing this numismatic data into connection with the historical situation in these years as known from literary sources (primarily Diodorus Siculus), Kenneth Jenkins argued that the Carthaginians initiated minting in order to pay for their initial expedition to Sicily in 410 BC (or possibly their second intervention in 409 BC, which was on a much larger scale), and continued producing coinage as required by their fluctuating circumstances during the following seventeen years of war, until peace was declared in 393 BC, following the Battle of Chrysas. The reverse legend, MḤNT, meaning 'encampment' has military overtones which support the idea that this coinage was intended to pay for ongoing military campaigns.

The location of the mint where this coinage was produced is not certainly known. Later issues of Carthaginian silver were produced in Sicily, at Lilybaeum (modern Marsala), but this city was only founded in 397/396 BC, following the destruction of Motya. The Carthaginian coinage is unlikely to have been produced in Motya before that date, since Motya seems to have continued minting its own coinage until its destruction. Therefore, Jenkins concludes that the initial production of the series probably took place in Carthage itself. The transition from sub-group E to sub-group F is marked by an iconographic shift, in which the obverse design goes from a depiction of the forepart of a horse to the depiction of a full horse. It is possible that change coincided with the shift of minting to the new city of Lilybaeum.

The gold-issue, Jenkins-Lewis Group I, is dated solely on the basis of its iconographic similarity to the final sub-group of the silver (Series I (F)), which suggests that it was minted at the same time. It may have been minted in Carthage or Lilybaeum. In the ancient Mediterranean, the issue of gold coinage was often connected to times of particular crisis, when silver stocks had been exhausted and states were forced to resort to melting down jewellery and religious dedications. This might fit with production in the later stages of the seventeen year Carthaginian war in Sicily.

=== Iconography ===
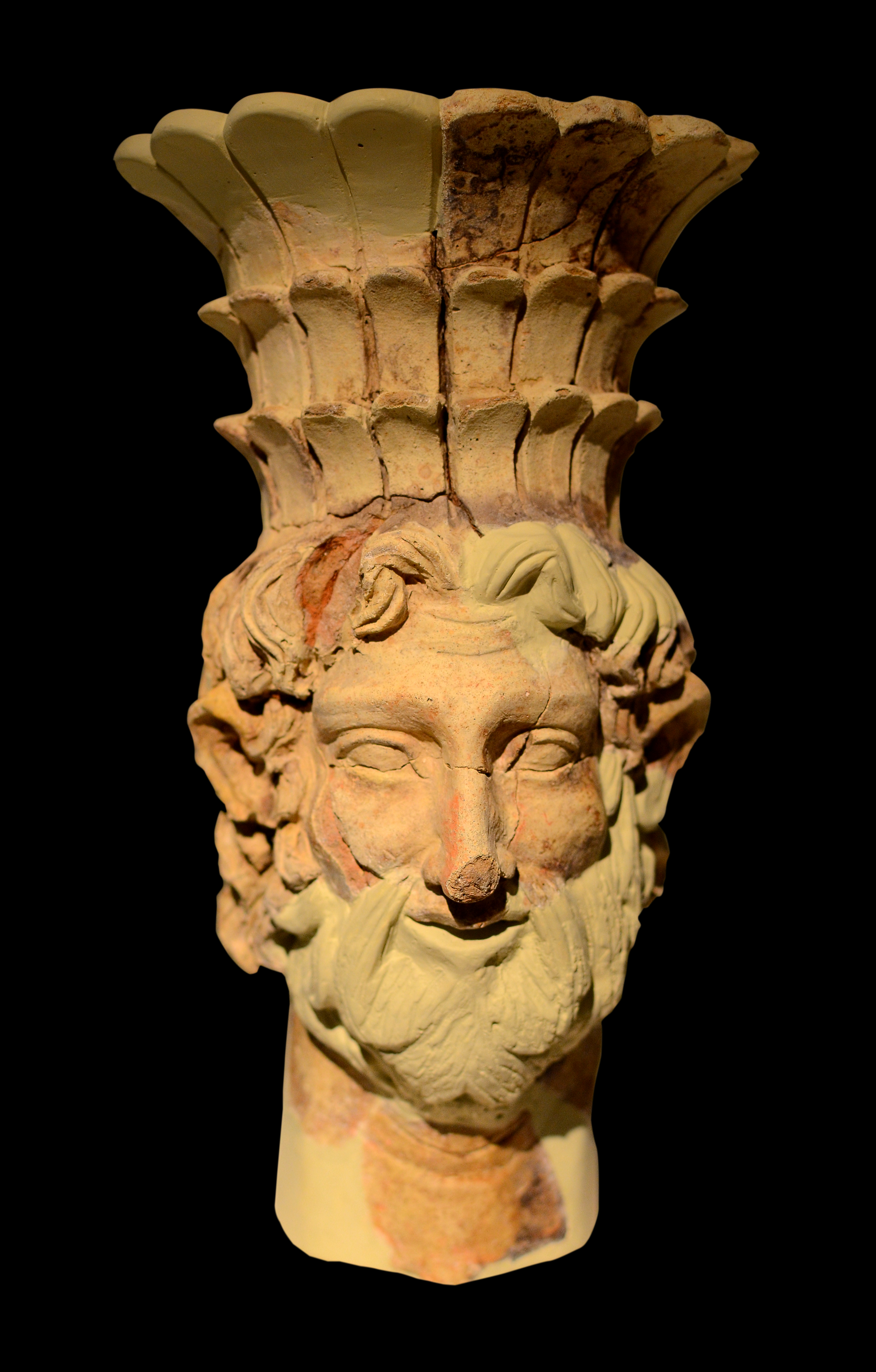
An incense burner depicting Ba'al-Hamon, 2nd century BC

Series I introduces two key motifs that continued to appear regularly on Carthaginian coinage throughout its history: the horse and the palm tree. The significance of both symbols is disputed, with a particular divide in scholarship around whether they should be interpreted in terms of Punic or Greek cultural traditions.

Three main interpretations of the horse have been proposed. One is that the horse was a symbol of Baal Hammon, the chief god of Carthage, who was probably associated with warfare and the sun. However, our knowledge of Carthaginian religion and the nature of its deities is very limited. On much later Carthaginian coinage, the horse sometimes appears with a sun disc, which might support this interpretation. The second interpretation is that the horse refers to a foundation legend of Carthage, known from the Roman historian Justin. According to him, at the foundation of Carthage a horse's head was found in the ground and was interpreted as an omen of the city's future prosperity. It was common on Greek coinages in Sicily and southern Italy to depict motifs connected to the minting city's foundation. But it is not clear whether this was a foundation story that the Carthaginians themselves knew or just a story that was told about them by the Romans. The third interpretation is that the horse refers to the military purpose of the coinage. Important for this interpretation is the fact that from sub-group B onwards, the horse is accompanied by a winged female figure holding a wreath and a caduceus. In Greek art, this figure is a symbol of victory, known as Nike, and the wreath was awarded to victors in contests and battles. These three interpretations are not necessarily mutually incompatible.

The usual interpretation of the palm tree is that it was a type of visual pun intended to signify the minting authority, since the Greek word for palm tree, phoinix is also the Greek word for 'Phoenician/Punic'. This kind of visual pun, often known as a 'canting type', was common on classical Greek coinage, particularly in Sicily, where prominent examples appear at Himera, Selinus, Zancle, and Leontini. Edward Stanley Robinson challenged this interpretation, on the grounds that a Greek pun would be surprising on a Punic coin. However, Greek was widely known and spoken in the Carthaginian-controlled portion of Sicily; on several earlier Siculo-Punic coinages, the coin legends are in Greek. An alternative explanation is that the palm was a symbol of the sun god Baal Hammon — if he was a sun-god — but there is not much evidence for this, except that the palm was a symbol of the Greek sun god, Apollo, at Delos.

On sub-group E, two unusual double-tiered pots appear on the obverse in between the letters of the legend. These vessels are a type of incense burner or thymiaterion, which is commonly found in pottery assemblages at Punic sites from this period. Its presence may support attempts to read the iconography of these coins in terms of Carthaginian religion.

== Mid-fourth century (c. 350/340 - 320/315 BC) ==
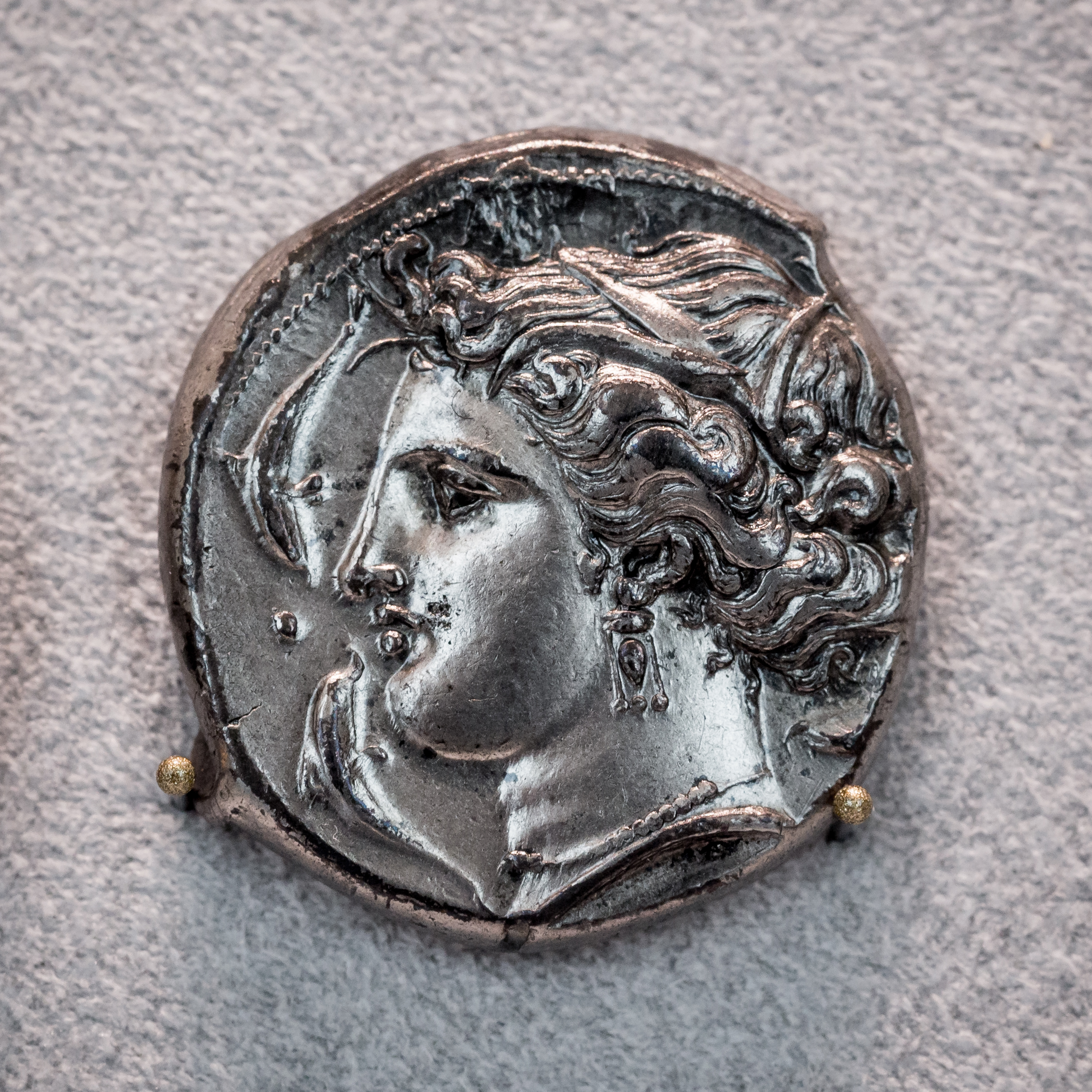
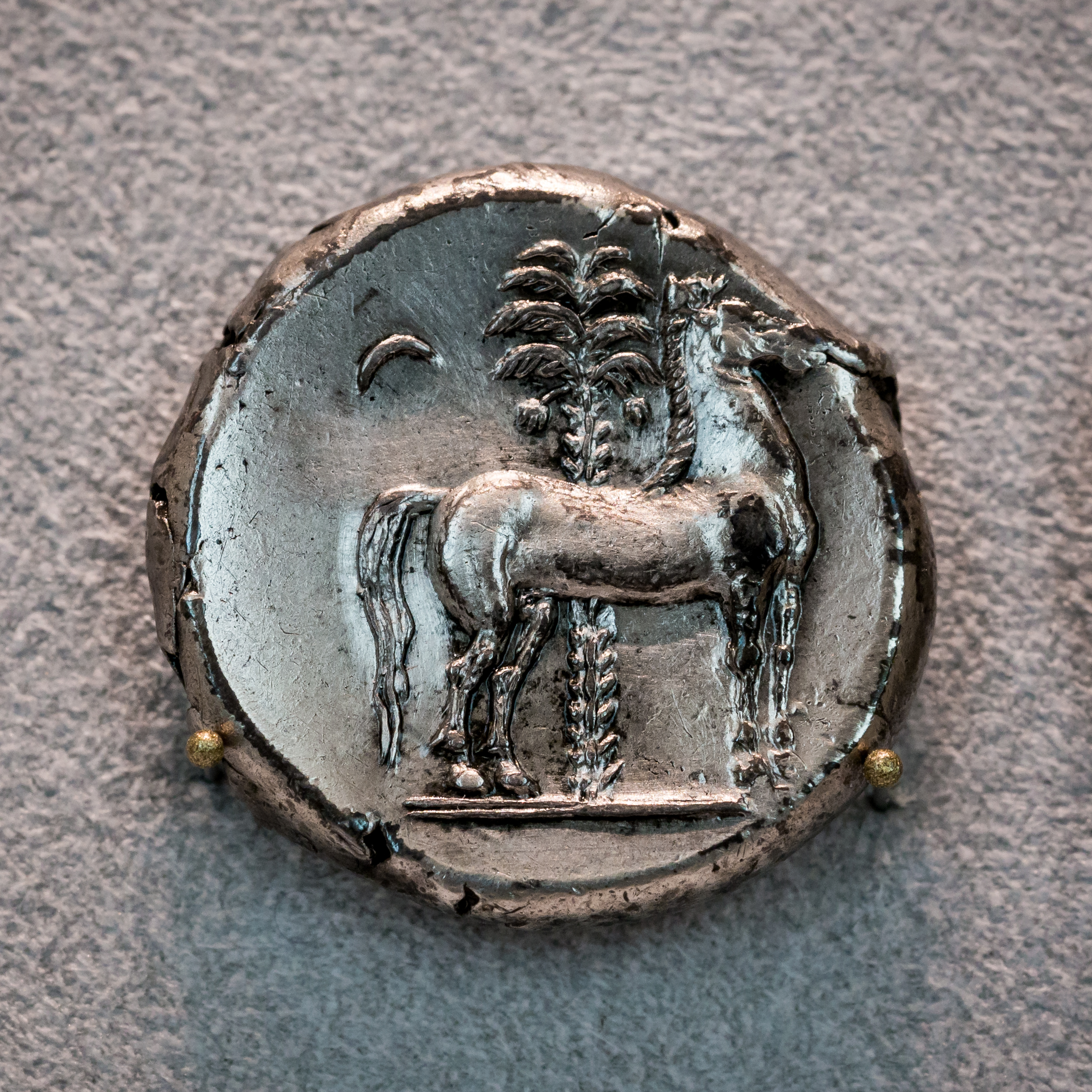
Jenkins, Series II (ca. 350-320/315 BC): silver tetradrachm. Altes Museum, Berlin.
Obverse: wreathed female head with two dolphins, modelled on Syracusan Arethusa.
Reverse: Horse standing in front of a palm tree and beside a star.

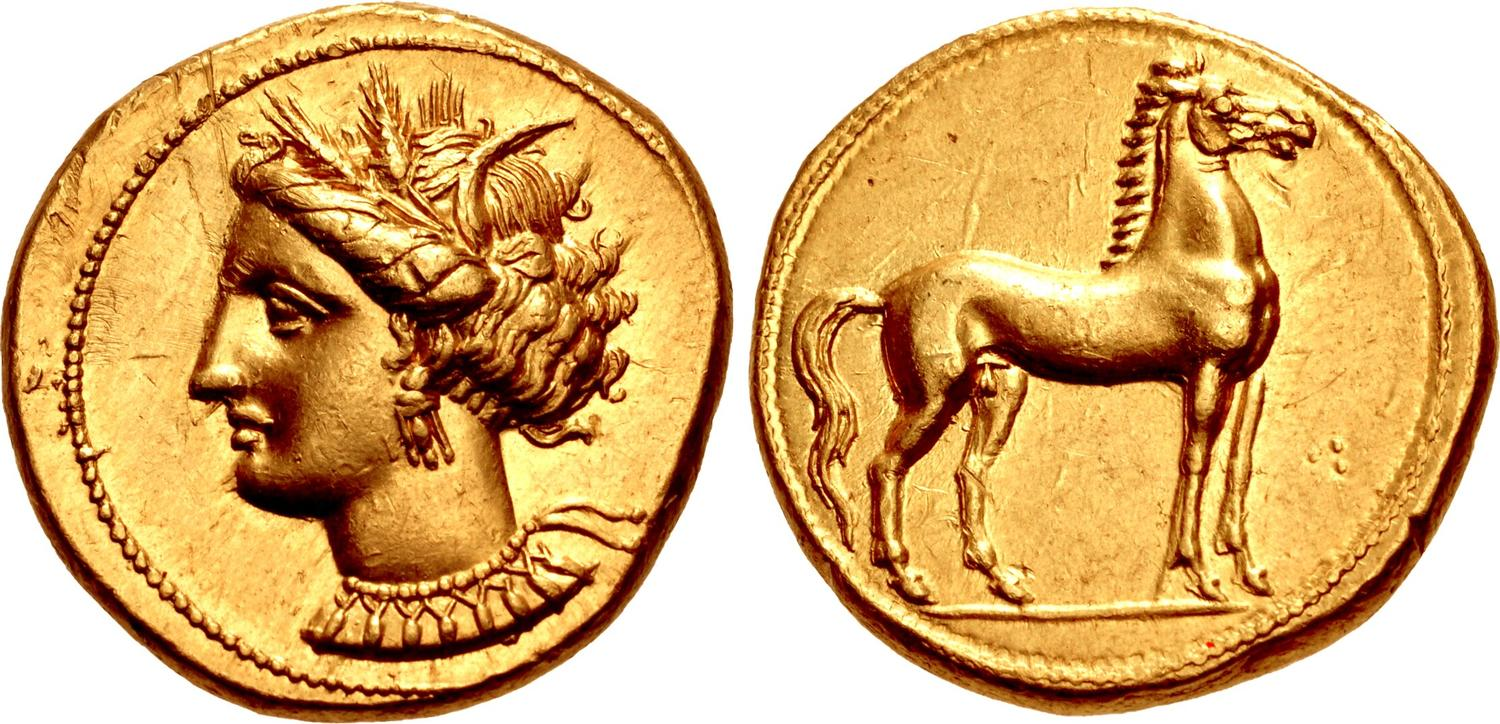
Jenkins-Lewis, Group III (ca. 350-320 BC): electrum shekel. Obverse: wreathed female head. Reverse: Standing horse.

After a hiatus in minting, a new Carthaginian coinage began to be struck between 350 and 340 BC. This new coinage consisted of another series of silver tetradrachms, known as Series II, with four subgroups (A-D), which lasted until 320/315 BC. These coins have a female head on the obverse, modelled on the depictions of Kore (sub-groups A.i, B, and C.iv) and Arethusa (sub-groups A.ii, C.i-iii, and D) on Syracusan coinage. The reverse usually has a horse standing still, with a palm tree behind it. The first issue has the legend QRTHDŠT, followed by M (𐤌) and BTW'L (𐤁𐤕𐤅𐤀𐤋) later in sub-group A, and by ḤB or BḤ (𐤇𐤁 or 𐤁𐤇) in sub-group C.

This was accompanied by a new gold coinage, Jenkins-Lewis, Group II, in two denominations (a shekel and a fifth-shekel), which was produced on a much larger scale than previous issues. It was followed by Jenkins-Lewis, Group III, the first large Carthaginian electrum issue (95% gold, 5% silver), with nine subgroups (A-I), which began being minted some time after 350 BC and continued until around 320 BC. It consists of an overweight shekel of 9.4 g and a number of smaller denominations (a half, a quarter, a fifth, and a tenth). Both Group II and III have same iconography: a female head modelled on Kore on the obverse and a horse on the reverse, without a palm tree or an inscriptions.

A set of bronze coins, SNG Cop. 94-98 were produced from around 350 to around 330 BC, in two denominations, with a male head on the obverse and a leaping horse on the reverse.

The impetus for this renewed minting seems to have been the Carthaginian interventions in eastern Sicily following the demise of Dionysius II's regime in Syracuse and then the Sixth Sicilian War against Timoleon. It was accompanied by renewed minting at a number of other Siculo-Punic centres, including 'Ṣyṣ' (Panormus), 'Ršmlqrt' (Selinous or Lilybaeum?), Therma, and perhaps Solous.

=== Date and mint locations ===
The date of the silver coinage is indicated by the fact that only early issues (sub-group A.i) appear in the Nissora and Gibil Gabib hoards (IGCH 2133 and 2132), which were deposited in the 330s BC. This implies that the first sub-group began some time in the 340s BC, which syncs well with the historical circumstance of the war between Timoleon and the Carthaginians of 344-341 BC. Sub-group D is known to be the last sub-group of the silver coinage, because it is die-linked with the first issue of the next set of silver coinage produced by the Carthaginians (Series III.A). Coins of sub-group D appear in the Megara Hyblaea hoard (IGCH 2135) which was deposited in the 320s BC, indicating that the series must have been coming to an end in that decade.

The gold of Jenkins-Lewis, Group II is dated by stylistic parallels with the obverse design of the earlier coins in the silver Series II, suggesting a date in the 340s BC, but it might actually begin earlier. Jenkins-Lewis, Group III is absent from the Avola hoard deposited around 360 BC and must therefore post-date it. The subsequent Jenkins-Lewis Group V occurs in the Scoglitti hoard (IGCH 2185a), deposited in the 290s BC, so Group III and Group IV were probably minted between c. 350 and 310 BC. The date of the bronze is indicated by archaeological finds in the western portion of Sicily.

The silver of Series II is generally identified as the product of a military mint that sometimes moved with the Carthaginian army but was usually located in Lilybaeum (modern Marsala). The gold of Group II may have been minted there as well, or in Carthage. Group III and subsequent groups do not seem to have been minted in the same place as the silver. They have a totally different system of control marks (the silver uses symbols, the electrum uses a system of dots). They are also stylistically distinct, with the silver tending to closely follow models from Syracusan coinage, while the electrum types do not imitate other coinage. Finally, from Group IV onwards (310s BC?), the electrum dies were regularly aligned (i.e., the top of the obverse die and the top of the reverse die match). The silver tetradrachms continue to have loose dies (i.e., the orientation of the two dies relative to each other is random). This shows that two metals were being manufactured with different techniques - suggesting they were made in separate workshops. All of these factors imply that the electrum was manufactured at a different mint from the silver. Usually, the electrum mint is identified with Carthage itself.

The location where SNG Cop. 94-98 were minted is uncertain. Suzanne Frey-Kupper argued that the mint was located in Sicily, since the vast majority of these coins have been found in Sicily and there is no other Punic bronze that could have been minted on Sicily in this time frame. Paolo Visonà argues they were minted in Carthage, since the smallest denomination (SNG Cop. 98), which would be the least likely to travel far from its mint, has only been found at Carthage itself.

=== Iconography ===
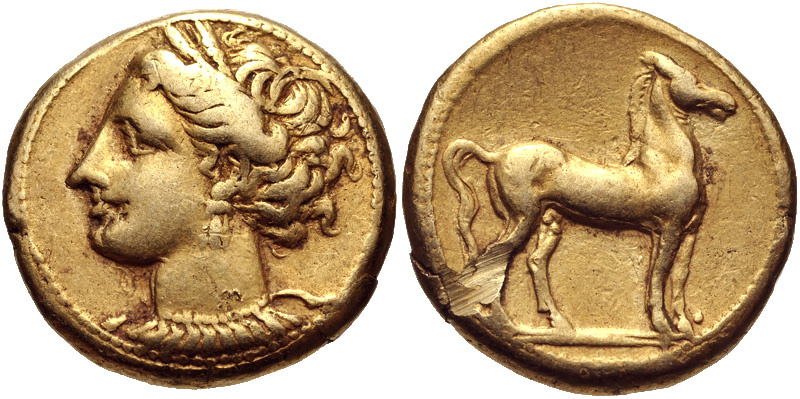
Jenkins-Lewis, Group III (ca. 350-320 BC): electrum shekel. Obverse: wreathed female head. Reverse: Standing horse.

The identity of the female head appearing on the obverse of the gold and silver issues is uncertain. The head is a close imitation of obverse dies from the mint of Syracuse depicting the goddesses Kore and Arethusa. Some scholars have argued that this was simply an imitation of a trusted design and no specific identity was intended for the figure. Other scholars have argued that it should be interpreted as a depiction of the goddess Kore. In support of this is the fact that Demeter and Kore were worshipped in Carthage, where they had had a temple since 396 BC. Furthermore, the one significant change made to the image is the addition of a wreath made out of sheafs of wheat, which might have been intended to make clear that the image depicted Kore, as goddess of grain and the harvest. Donald Harden argued that the head should be interpreted as the Carthaginian goddess Tanit, "in the guise of the Sicilian Persephone [i.e. Kore]," a position which is supported by many other scholars Kenneth Jenkins suggests that this could be linked with the interpretation of the horse on the reverse as a symbol of Baal Hammon, since one of Tanit's main epithets in Carthage was Pene Ba'al (face of Ba'al), but he concedes that evidence that the Carthaginians identified Tanit with Kore is "lacking."

Jenkins interprets the rayed disc that accompanies the horse on the reverse of one issue of the silver (within sub-group B), as supporting the identification of the horse with Baal Hammon.

=== Exchange rate ===
The gold and silver coinage were intended to function together as a single system, but the rate of exchange between them is not known for certain. Jenkins and Lewis proposed that in the time of Group II there was a silver:gold ratio of 15:1, in which case one gold shekel in this period would have been equivalent to 25 silver drachmas of this period. Since the silver coinage was only minted in tetradrachms (coins worth four drachmas), it would not have been practically easy to exchange one of the gold coins for its equivalent in silver, if this ratio is correct.

For the subsequent Group III, the weight of the main gold denomination was increased from 7.6 g to 9.4 g, but was adulterated with silver (5%). Jenkins and Lewis propose that the silver to electrum ratio was 11.25:1, later falling to 11:1. Thus, one electrum shekel would have initially been worth 25 drachms and later 24 drachms. On this argument the smaller denominations of Group III belong to two different stages. The fifth and tenth units would belong to the earlier period and would have been worth 5 and 2.5 silver drachmas respectively, while the half and quarter would have belonged to the later period and have been worth 12 and 6 silver drachmas respectively.

== Late fourth century (320-305 BC) ==
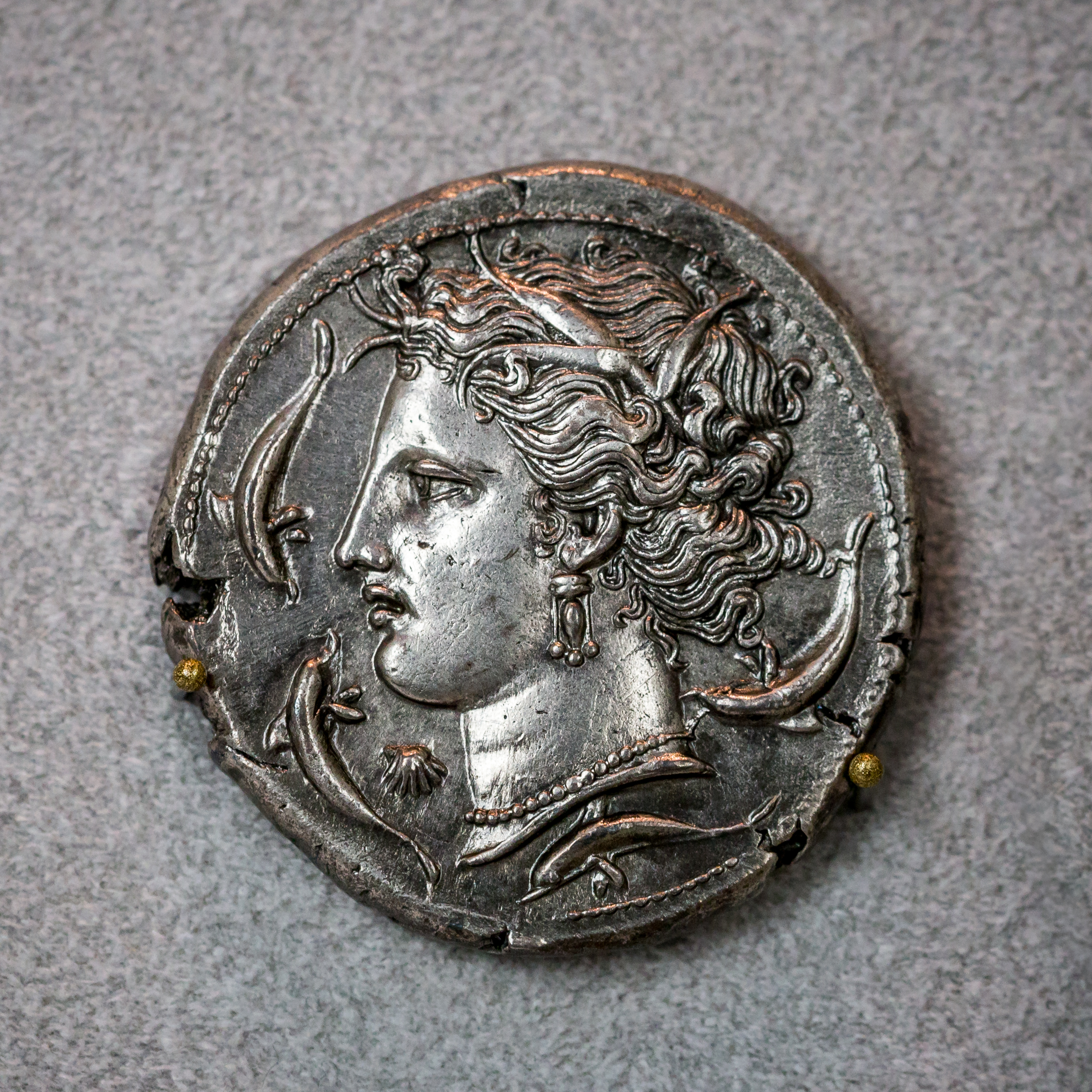
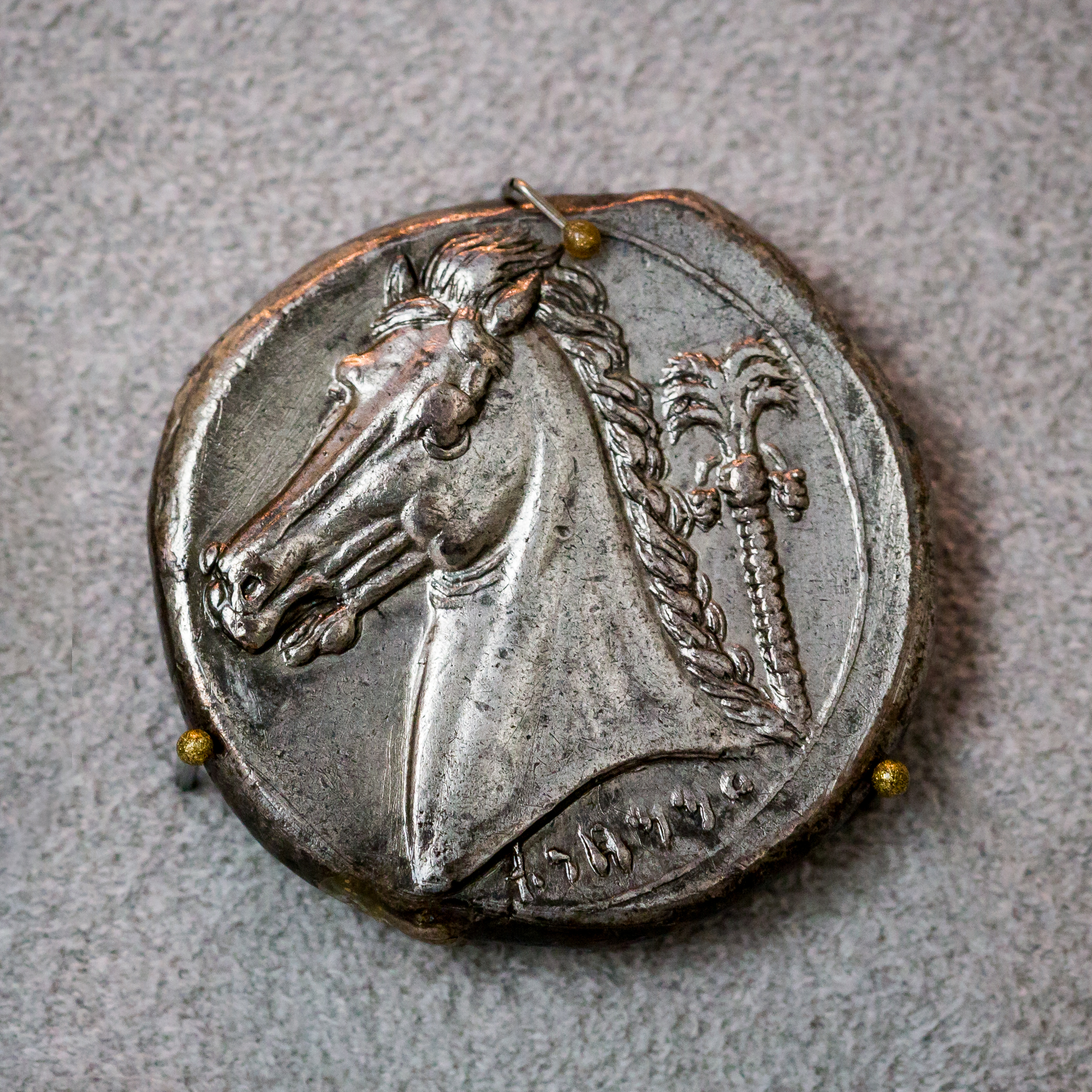
Series III (320s-305 BC): silver tetradrachm, Altes Museum, Berlin.
Obverse: female head surrounded by dolphins. Reverse: horse's head with palm tree at right, legend reads 𐤏𐤌𐤌𐤇𐤍𐤕 (ʿM MHNT, 'people of the encampment').
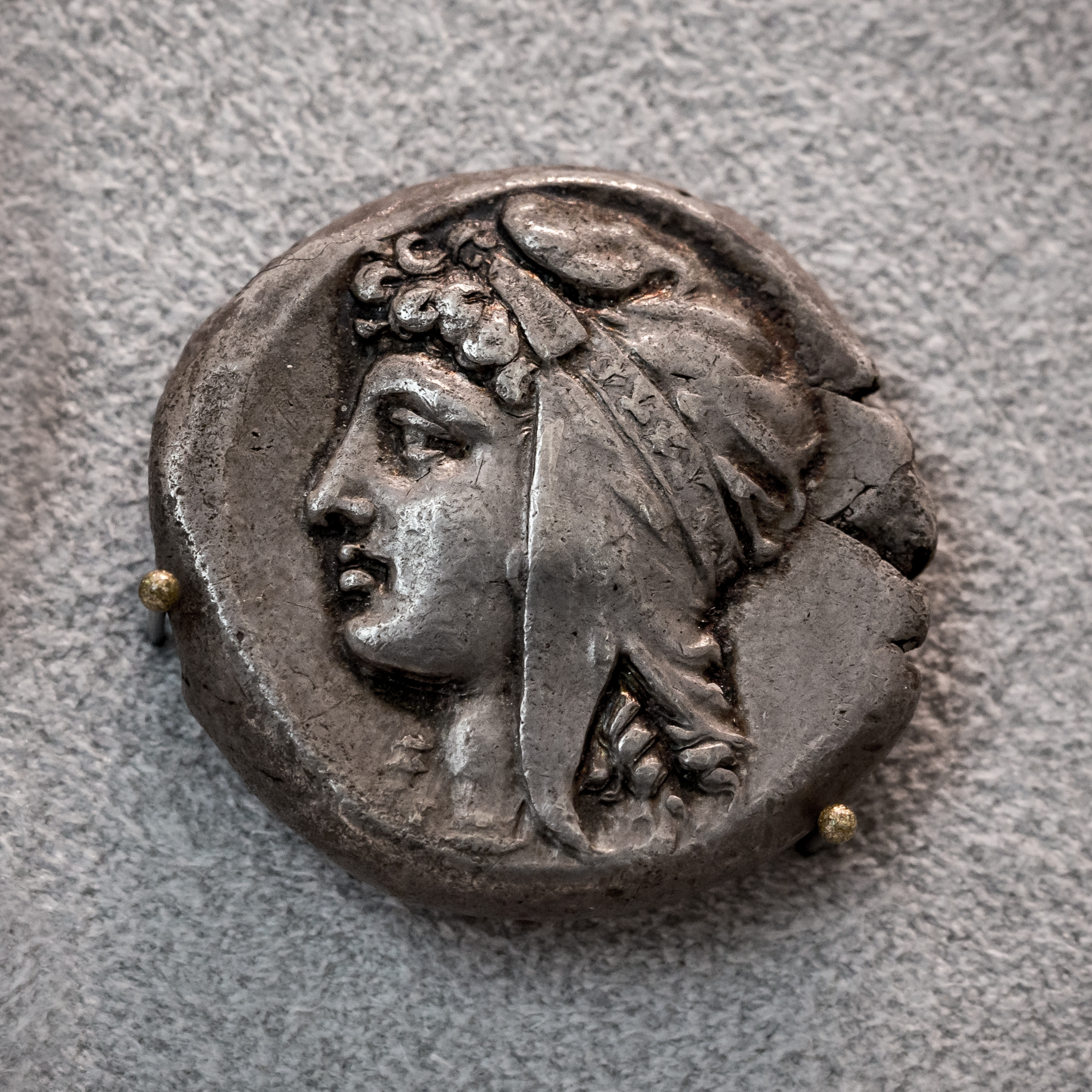
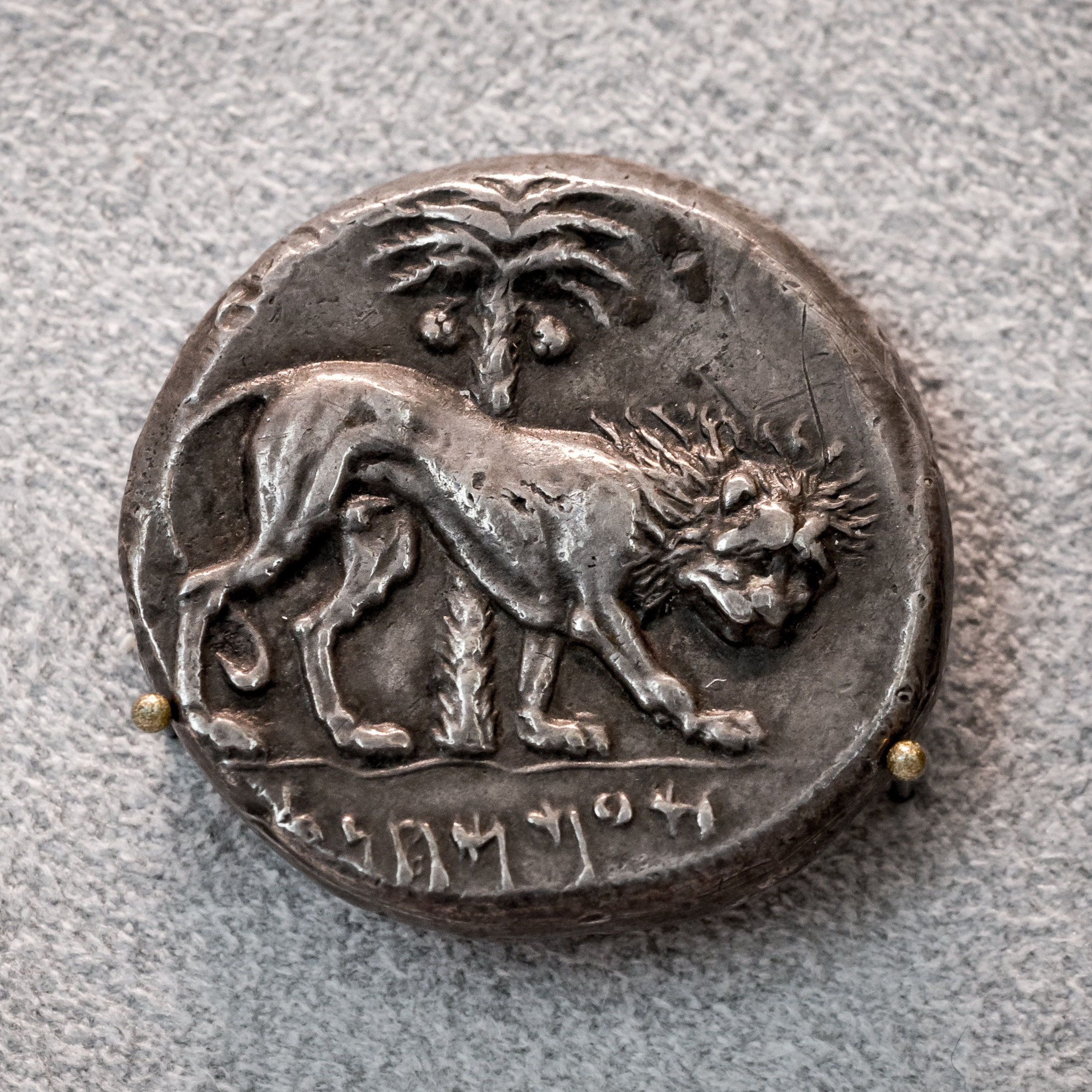
Series IV (320s-290 BC): silver tetradrachm, Altes Museum, Berlin.
Obverse: female head in phrygian cap. Reverse: lion in front of a palm tree, legend reads 𐤌𐤏𐤌𐤌𐤇𐤍𐤕 (MʿM MHNT, 'from people of the encampment').

The next series of silver coinage, Series III, continues directly out of the previous series (the last issue of Series II shares a die with the first issue of Series III). It consisted of four sub-groups (A-D), which were minted continuously in large quantities. The obverse bears a female head modelled on the depictions of Arethusa on Syracusan coins, while the reverse is horse's head with a palm at right. On sub-group A, the legend on the reverse reads ʿM MHNT (𐤏𐤌𐤌𐤇𐤍𐤕, 'people of the encampment'). On later sub-groups, it is abbreviated to MM (𐤌𐤌, III.B), ʿ (𐤏, III.C), M (𐤌, III.D). Another silver issue, Series IV, was minted occasionally, in small quantities, simultaneously with Series III. It has a totally novel iconography. The obverse shows a head, probably female, wearing a Phrygian cap, while the reverse depicts a lion stalking in front of a palm.

A new electrum issue, Jenkins-Lewis, Group IV, perhaps began to be minted in the 310s BC and contained four sub-groups (A-D). It returned to the normal shekel of 7.2 g, with two smaller denominations (a fifth and a tenth), but had a much lower gold content than the previous group (72% gold, 28% silver). Group IV continues to depict a female head on the obverse and a standing horse on the reverse, exactly as on Group III.

The bronze issue, SNG Cop. 102-105 began sometime between 330 and 310 BC. They have a palm tree on the obverse and a horse's head on the reverse.

=== Dating and mint location ===
The continuity with the previous issues means that the mints of the electrum and silver issues were almost certainly in the same location as in the previous period. The legend on the silver coinage supports the idea that it was minted at a mobile military mint.

The beginning of Series III of the silver is inferred from the ending date of Series II in the 320s BC. It is presumed that the new series was begun to fund the interventions in eastern Sicily at the start of Agathocles' reign in Syracuse in 317 BC. Series III had ended by the time the Pachino 1957 hoard (IGCH 2151) was deposited in the 290s BC. The Series IV coinage is dated by its appearance in the same hoard, as well as by its stylistic links to Series II.D and Series III.A of around 320 BC.

The bronze coinage, SNG Cop. 102-105 includes coins overstruck on SNG Cop. 94-98, indicating that it followed that issue. Like SNG Cop. 94-98, it comes with two distinct types of flan: a bulging round flan (SNG Cop. 103-105) and a flat, cast flan with bevelled edges (SNG Cop. 102). Metal analysis shows that the same alloy is used for both issues and for both flan types. This is strong evidence that SNG Cop. 102-105 was minted at the same mint as SNG Cop. 94-98. SNG Cop. 102-105 was itself overstruck at Syracuse by bronze coinage of Hicetas (289-287 BC), indicating that SNG Cop. 102-105 remained in circulation through the 290s BC.

=== Iconography ===
Most of the coins have the same iconography as in the previous issue. The key iconographic problem specific to this period is the identification of the head on the obverse of the Series IV silver. One suggestion is that it depicts Dido, the semi-mythical founder of Carthage. This would fit into a common pattern on Greek coinages of Sicily and southern Italy, which often depict the founder of the community. Another suggestion is that the figure is a personification of Libya - a theory rejected by Jenkins as "hardly consistent with Carthaginian nationalism." Jenkins himself found close parallels in terracotta figurines of Artemis, which show Artemis alongside a lion or a palm tree. He proposes that onomastic evidence shows that Artemis was identified with Tanit and thus that it is Series IV that depicts the goddess Tanit.

== Early third century (305/300-264 BC) ==
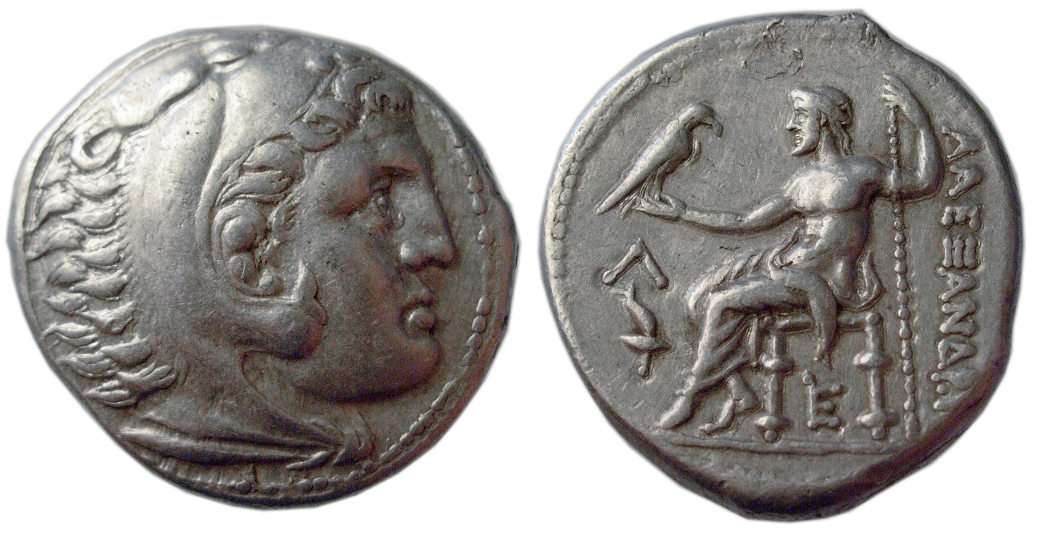
Silver tetradrachm of Alexander the Great, minted at Amphipolis. The obverse depiction of Heracles is the model for the obverse of Carthage's Series V silver tetradrachms.

Series V is a set of silver tetradrachms minted from ca. 305 to ca. 295 BC. The obverse imitates the silver coinage of Alexander the Great, depicting the head of Heracles wearing a lion-skin, while the reverse shows a horse's head with a palm tree at right, often accompanied by a symbol as a control mark. There are two sub-groups (5.A-5.B). These bear different legends: 5.A reads ʿM MHNT (𐤏𐤌𐤌𐤇𐤍𐤕, 'people of the encampment'), while 5.B nearly always reads MHSBM (𐤌𐤇𐤔𐤁𐤌, 'the quaestors' or 'the financial controllers'). The flans also differ, with those of 5.B being substantially more "compact" than 5.A. The obverse design of 5.A imitates the image of Heracles on coinage of Alexander produced at Tarsus, Alexandria, and Sidon, while 5.B. is close to the Alexander coinage from Amphipolis. The horse head on the reverse of 5.A is much more curvaceous and extended than that of 5.B. These sub-groups are themselves divided into smaller sub-groups (5.A.i-iv and 5.B.i-ii).

The electrum issues Jenkins-Lewis, Group V-VI were produced throughout this period. Their iconography only differs from Group IV in a few details and their weight remains the same (7.2 g), but the gold content drops repeatedly. Group V has a curling motif on the reverse as a control mark rather than an ear of grain and the gold content is (55-60 % gold, 40-45 % silver). There are six sub-groups (A-F), distinguished by patterns of dots on the reverse and no smaller denominations. In Group VI, which was produced in the 270s BC, the female head on the obverse is larger and the curling motif is no longer present. The gold content drops to 43-47 %. There are eight sub-groups (A-H), distinguished by an increasing number of dots on the reverse. There is one smaller denomination, a half shekel.

The bronze issue SNG Cop. 109–119, with a wreathed female head on the obverse and a horse standing in front of a palm on the reverse (i.e. similar to the earlier Series II silver), was issued in western Sicily in very large quantities from around 305 BC until ca. 280 BC. Like the bronze issues of the previous period there are two distinct flans - a lower quality spherical flan, which is rarer, and a cast flan that is more common. A similar bronze issue, SNG Cop. 220–223, with the same iconography, but an aleph (𐤀) or a caduceus on the reverse appears to have been produced on Sardinia between 280 and 260 BC.

These bronze issues seem to have been followed in the 390s BC by a new set of bronze issues, SNG Cop. 144-153 and SNG Cop. 154–178. These two types look very similar, with a female head on the obverse and a horse's head on the reverse (i.e. similar to the Series III silver). SNG Cop. 144-153 has a round flan with an average weight of 4.75 g, the female figure has a convex neck, and the overall appearance is similar to the Group V electrum. SNG Cop. 154-178 has flat, cast flans with a slightly lower average weight (4.5 g), the female figure has a concave neck, and a wide variety of mintmarks.

SNG Cop. 192–201, with a wreathed female head on the obverse and a horse's head with a palm tree on the reverse was also produced in Sardinia in the period before the First Punic War.

=== Dating and mint location ===
Series V regularly appears alongside the Agathocles of Syracuse's second set of tetradrachms, which were issued between ca. 305 and ca. 295 BC, in hoards, suggesting that the two were contemporaneous. The two sub-groups, 5.A and 5.B appear to have been minted simultaneously, since they appear together in hoards in similar quantities and states of wear. The different legends, different stylistic features, and lack of die links between the two sub-groups indicate that they were produced by different mints. 5.A probably continues the mobile military mint of the previous period. The MHSBM ('financial controllers') of 5.B are also attested in a financial role in an inscription from Carthage and in Livy as quaestores. Jenkins proposes that their presence on the coinage, along with the final end of the Siculo-Punic coinages in this period indicates "closer and more direct control of the Sicilian territory by the Carthaginian state."

As in the previous period, the electrum issues appear to have been produced in Carthage itself. A worn example of one of the latest sub-groups of Group VI (VI.G) appears in the Carlentini hoard (IGCH 2206) of ca. 260 BC, suggesting that the Group as a whole was produced in the 270s and early 260s BC.

SNG Cop. 109-119 was minted in western Sicily, since most finds of it come from that area. Analysis of the metal content is very similar to SNG Cop. 102-105 of the previous period, which were also minted in Sicily. The shape of the flans is also very similar. Finds in graves at Lilybaeum show that the coins began to be minted before 300 BC and its presence at Montagna dei Cavalli in the destruction layer of ca. 260 BC shows that they remained in circulation at the start of the First Punic War. The association of SNG Cop. 220-223 and SNG Cop. 192–201 with Sardinia is demonstrated by their different patterns of finds (the latter are more common in Sardinia; in Sicily, both are restricted to coastal sites), their shared mint marks and metal content.

=== Iconography ===
The image of Heracles on the obverse of Series V was probably interpreted as his standard equivalent in Phoenician religion: Melqart, the chief god of Carthage's mother-city, Tyre. Jenkins argues that the adoption of the motif was simply motivated by the widespread presence of Alexander's coinage in this period, but suggests that the change might also have been a claim to Carthaginian pre-eminence in the Phoenician world, following the destruction of Tyre in 332 BC. The possible interpretations of the horse head and palm tree on the reverse are the same as for earlier periods.

== First Punic War (264-241 BC) ==
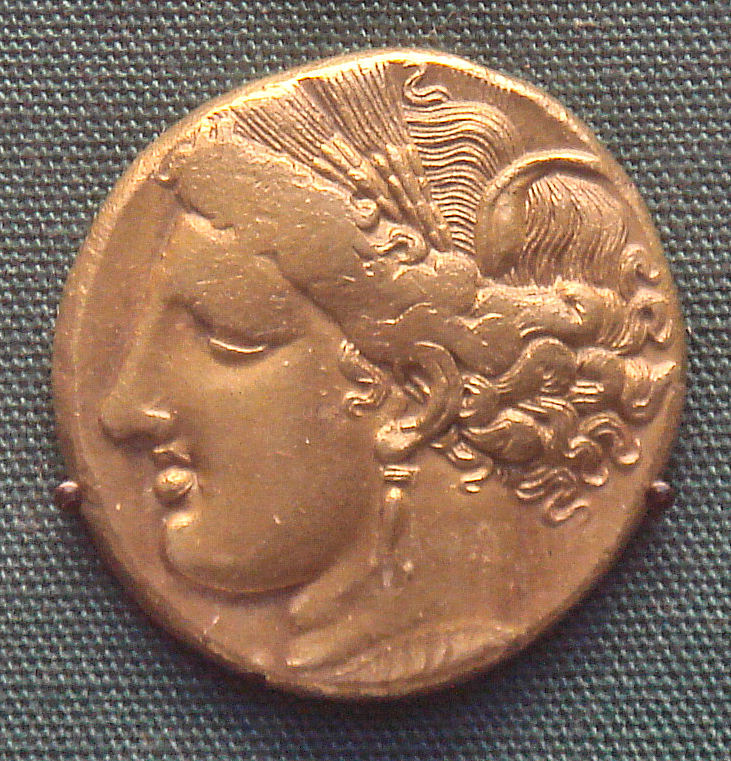
Electrum coin with a wreathed female head.

=== North African issues ===
The Carthaginians minted a wide variety of coins in various metals during the First Punic War. The Jenkins-Lewis, Group VII electrum was produced around 270 BC and has the same weight (7.2 g), gold content (45%) and imagery as Group VI, but a "more formal" style. There are no sub-groups and no smaller denominations.

Jenkins-Lewis, Group IX is a pure gold issue in two denominations, one weighing 12.5 g and the other weighing 25 g. These appear to be equivalent to 20 and 40 silver shekels respectively, on a gold:silver ratio of 13 1/3:1. The iconography depicts a female head on the obverse and a horse looking back over its shoulder. Hoard evidence and the fact that the dies are aligned shows that Group IX was made in Carthage. The coins have marks on them left by patches of rust on the dies, suggesting that they were made out iron, as part of an emergency coinage issue - probably Regulus' invasion in 256 BC.

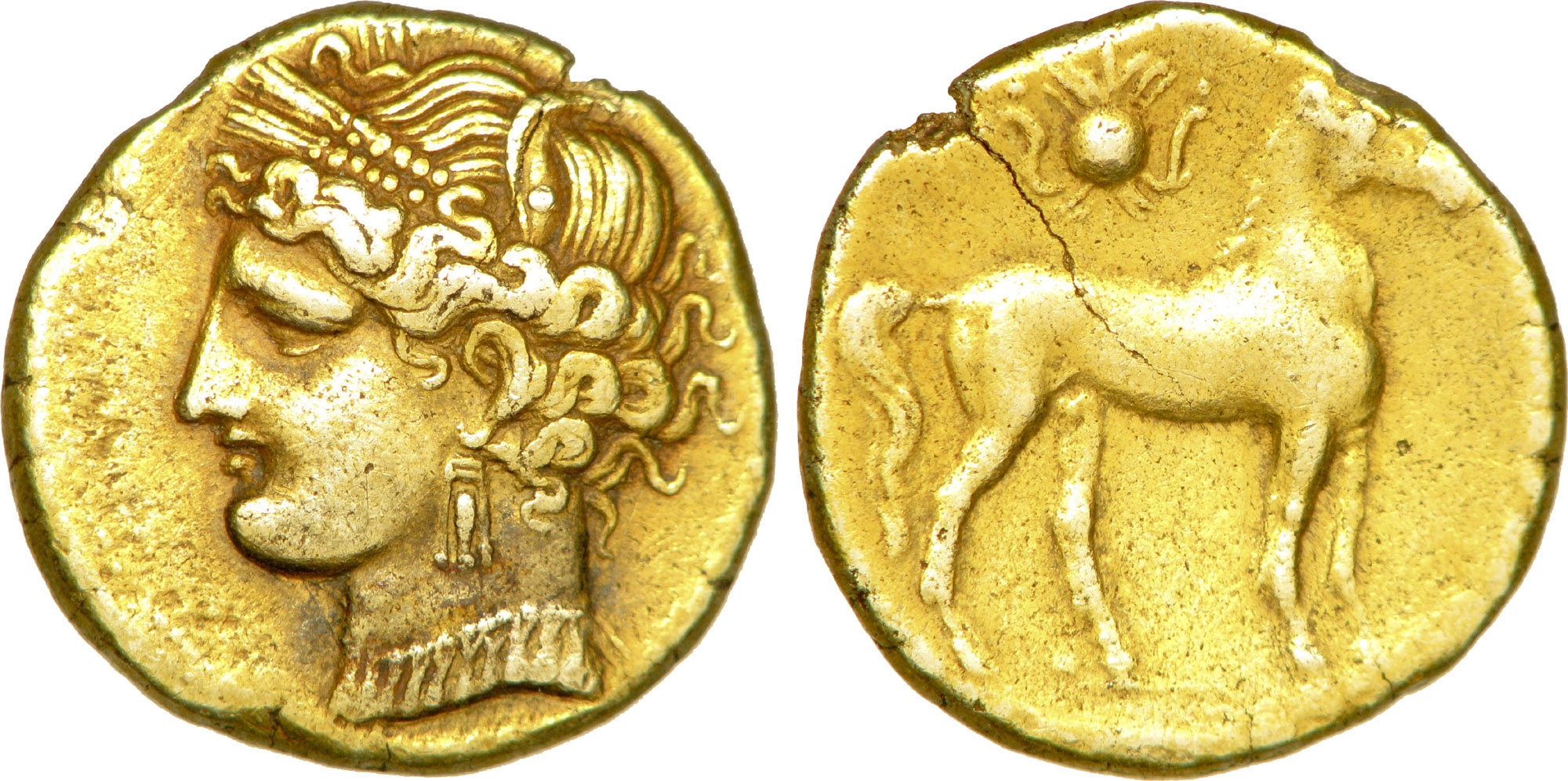
Jenkins-Lewis Group X.B (ca. 240s BC): Obverse: Female head. Reverse: Horse with sun disk

Jenkins-Lewis, Group X is a very large electrum issue which replaced Group IX at Carthage at an uncertain date and continued for the rest of the First Punic War. The obverse depicts a wreathed female head as in the previous issues, while the reverse shows a standing horse looking forward, with a sun disc flanked by two uraei hovering above its back. There are two sub-groups. Group X.A, which is earlier, weighs 10.8-11 g and has a gold content of around 45-49 %. It contains seven further sub-sub-groups. Group X.B is lighter (10.5-10.7 g) and a lower gold content (34-36 %). The mint location and date is demonstrated by the fact that Group X coins are frequently overstruck by coins produced by rebels during the Mercenary War (241-237 BC). Group X is accompanied by a silver coinage with the same iconography, minted in billon (silver heavily mixed with lead).

=== Sicilian issues ===
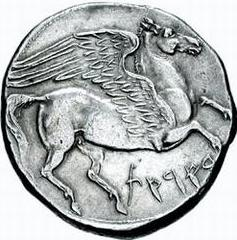
Series VI, silver five-shekel coin. Obverse: Wreathed female head (not pictured). Reverse: Pegasus flying right, legend reads 𐤁𐤀𐤓𐤑𐤕 (B'RṢT, 'in the land')

In Sicily the Carthaginians minted Jenkins-Lewis, Group VIII electrum and Series VI silver. Group VIII consisted of a single denomination of 21.6 g - a triple shekel - with a gold content of 30%. The Series VI silver probably is divided into three denominations: a six-shekel or dodecadrachm coin (45 g), with a female head on the obverse and a prancing horse on the reverse; a three-shekel or hexadrachm coin (21 g), with a similar female head on the obverse and a horse's head on the reverse; and a five-shekel or decadrachm coin (36 g), with a female head on the obverse and a Pegasus flying right on the reverse. Group VIII and the five-shekel coins of Series VI both bear a legend on the reverse which reads, B'RṢT (𐤁𐤀𐤓𐤑𐤕). Older scholarship interpreted this as the Punic language form of Byrsa, the citadel of Carthage, but Anna Maria Bisi argued that the more natural interpretation was "in the land." Carthaginian inscriptions show that 'RṢT ("land") was the standard term for the Carthaginian administrative districts (known in Latin sources as pagi). Jenkins argues that it indicated the "land" of Sicily. The localisation of these issues to Sicily is based on the fact that they are only found in hoards from Sicily and the fact that their dies are not aligned.

=== Sardinian issues ===
Hoard evidence shows that most of the bronze coinage issued during the First Punic War was minted in Sardinia, perhaps because it was more secure. In the 250s BC, the main bronze coinage is SNG Cop. 202-215, weighing around 7.5 g, with a wreathed female head on the obverse and a standing horse with or without a palm tree on the reverse. The later bronze issues are minted at a higher weight, perhaps in response to the debasement of the silver coinage. The Roman annexation of Sardinia in 238 BC marked the end of Carthaginian minting there.

== Interwar Period (241-218 BC) ==
Between the First and Second Punic Wars, Carthage issued separate coinages in North Africa and in the region of Spain controlled by the Barcids. The coinages produced in these two regions circulated separately; i.e., coinage minted in Spain is not found in North Africa and coinage minted in North Africa is not found in Spain.

=== North Africa ===
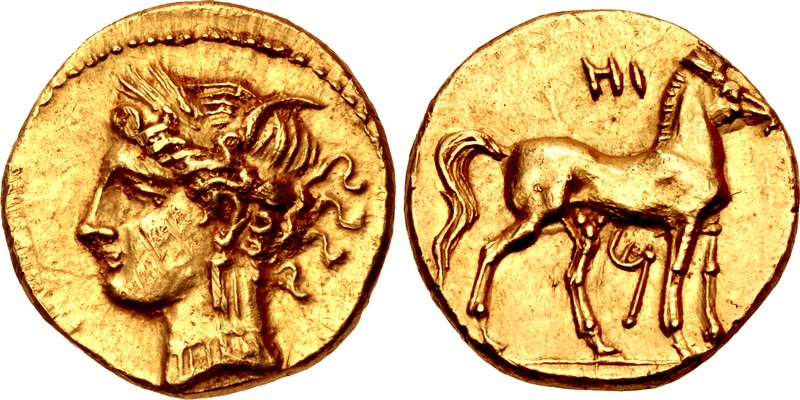
Jenkins-Lewis, Group XI (ca. 240 BC): Gold shekel Obverse: wreathed female head. Reverse: Standing horse, III.

A short-lived gold issue, Jenkins-Lewis, Group XI is nearly pure gold and has a female head on the obverse and a horse on the reverse. A symbol III perhaps indicates that it was worth three double shekels of silver, which would give a plausible gold:silver ratio of 12:1. The quality of the imagery suggests that it was produced in a hurry. It appears in hoards along with coinage produced by Carthage's opponents in the Mercenary War (242-238/7 BC), indicating that it was produced during or in the run-up to that war.

The majority of the coinage produced in North Africa in this period is bronze. In the 230s BC, there were a set of heavy bronzes, SNG Cop. 253-254, with a female head on the obverse and a horse standing in front of a palm on the reverse, which weigh 15 g. Around 230 BC, a more complicated system of bronze and billon coins are introduced, with three denominations: SNG Cop. 261 (24 g), SNG Cop. 260 (12 g), SNG Cop. 255-259 (6 g).

Jenkins-Lewis, Group XIII is an electrum quarter shekel coin (1.7 g), with a very low gold content (14%). The obverse is a female head and the reverse is a standing horse looking back over its shoulder (i.e. similar to Group IX of the First Punic War). Jenkins and Lewis place it in the 230s BC, but there is no strong evidence.

A pure gold quarter shekel (1.7 g), Jenkins-Lewis, Group XIV, with a female head on the obverse and a standing horse on the reverse, was minted along with a billon coin with the same iconography in the period immediately before the outbreak of the Second Punic War. Its date and assignment to North Africa is based on its presence in the El Djem hoard (IGCH 2300).

=== Barcid Spain ===
The Barcids in Spain issued gold and silver coins. bearing the head of Melqart, with his club but without a lionskin on the obverse, and a horse and palm tree on the reverse.

The gold staters, Jenkins-Lewis, Group XII, were produced at a weight of 7.50 g in two separate types. The first, Group XII.A have the head of Nike on the obverse and a prancing horse on the reverse, while Group XII.B has a male head on the obverse (possibly the Barcid leader, Hasdrubal the Fair) and a ship's prow on the reverse. Edward Stanley Robinson argued that XII.A was minted at Gades between 237 and 230 BC and that XII.B was minted after 230 BC at the Barcids newly founded Spanish capital, New Carthage, but Jenkins and Lewis view these mint identifications and dates as uncertain.

Jenkins and Lewis suggest an exchange rate between gold and silver of 1:12, in which case one gold stater would have been worth 24 silver drachmas. L. Villaronga argues for a gold:silver ratio of 1:11 1/3, in which one gold stater would be worth twelve silver shekels.

== Second Punic War (218-201 BC) ==
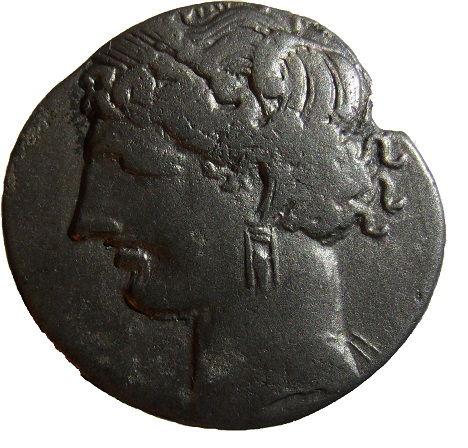
A c. 210 BC billon Carthaginian tridrachm coin bearing the wreathed head of Tanit.

During the Second Punic War, the Carthaginians minted coinage in electrum, silver, bronze and billon in several different theatres. In North Africa, coinage was minted throughout the war. Coinage was minted in Spain until it was lost to the Romans in 205 BC. Special coinages were minted for the Carthaginian forces in southern Italy under Hannibal from 215 to 210 BC and for the Carthaginian expedition to Sicily in 213-210 BC.

=== Barcid Spain (218-206 BC) ===
Spanish expansion and Roman plunder permitted issues in precious metals during the Second Punic War, including two large silver issues for use on Sicily. One set of half-shekels featured a diademed male head obverse and elephant reverse; another featured a male head with grain wreath obverse and a galloping horse reverse.

The shekel also decreased in Barcid areas from 7.2 to around 7.0 g over the course of the war. Bronze coins similarly varied in weight between 8 and 10 g owing to varying exchange rates between it and the silver currency.

=== Sicily (213-210 BC) ===
Syracuse under Hieronymus, initially a Roman ally, joined the Carthaginian side of the war in 216 BC. Roman forces soon proved more than a match for the Syracusans and the Carthaginians sent an expeditionary force under Himilco to reinforce them in 213 BC, where it remained active until 210 BC.

The earlier issue of silver coinage, SNG Cop. 378–380, was struck in Sicily, probably at Agrigentum, the Carthaginian headquarters in Sicily. It consists of three denominations: a half shekel, a quarter, and an eighth. The obverse of this issue bears a beardless male head wearing a corn wreath, which might be Triptolemus. The reverse has a running horse, with the Punic letter heth (ḥ, 𐤇) on the half shekel and heth taw (ḥt, 𐤇𐤕) on the quarter shekel. The same legend appears on some coins of Agrigentum during this period, suggesting that this issue was also minted at Agrigentum. These coins are overstruck on Roman victoriati, which began to be minted in 211 BC.

This issue was accompanied by bronze coinage, with a veiled female head wearing a corn wreath on the obverse (Demeter?) and a running horse on the reverse, which is accompanied by the Punic letter heth (ḥ, 𐤇) and a symbol. The date is supported by the iconographic link with the silver issue and by examples which are overstruck on Roman semunciae issued after 211 BC. Andrew Burnett argues that the iconographic link with the silver issue suggests that it was minted at Agrigentum. Paolo Visonà suggests Morgantina as an alternative.

Another issue of silver coinage, SNG Cop. 382–383, overlapped with the previous, but perhaps continued to be minted slightly later. The obverse bears a male head wearing a wreath (perhaps Melqart) and the reverse has an elephant, accompanied by the Punic letter aleph (𐤀). It consists of three denominations: a shekel, a half, and a quarter. Previously, this issue was associated with Spain, but it is only found in hoards from Sicily, indicating that it was minted there. These coins are frequently overstruck on the earliest Roman denarii (produced ca. 211 BC).

These coinages are relatively common in museum collections because the disturbed conditions of the Second Punic War meant that they were frequently deposited in hoards. However, the actual quantity minted seems to be relatively low - equivalent to the issues of Syracuse, Agrigentum, and the Sikeliotai in this period, and far smaller than the issues produced by the Romans in Sicily at the same time. Burnett proposes that they were minted not just to meet Carthaginian military expenses in Sicily, but that the overstriking of Roman coinage with these Punic issues also had a symbolic dimension derived from "the desire to obliterate Roman coins as a symbol of Roman power."

== Final period (200-146 BC) ==
Following the Carthaginian defeat in the Second Punic War, the Carthaginians minted purely in bronze. Carthage appears to have operated a closed currency system, in which people bringing gold and silver coinage into the city had to give it to the civic authorities in exchange for local bronze coinage. Ptolemaic Egypt operated a similar system in this period. In textual sources, the period after the Second Punic War is presented as a period of economic recovery for the Carthaginians, but Paolo Visonà suggests that the absence of precious metal coinage "casts doubt" on this narrative.

There are three bronze denominations. SNG Cop. 409-413, weighing around 100 g, bears a female head on the obverse and a standing horse on the reverse with a uraeus sun-disk above it (i.e., the same design as the Group X electrum). SNG Cop. 399-400 weighs around 20 g and has a female head on the obverse and a horse raising one hoof on the reverse. SNG Cop. 414 has the same design as 409-413, but weighs only 4 g. It is very rare. Bronze coinages also began to be issued at Utica and by the Numidian kings in this period.

During the Third Punic War, the Carthaginians issued their very last coinage in gold, silver, and bronze, with a female head on the obverse and a horse raising one hoof, with a pellet in the field. Some issues have a serrated edge. The gold issue, Jenkins-Lewis, Group XVIII is very pure, but only issued in a relatively small denomination of 3 g (4/5 drachma). The silver, SNG Cop. 401-408 weighs 13.10 g (roughly 2 shekels). After the war, most of the silver and gold was probably melted down, but Carthaginian bronze coinage is common in Illyria in the late second and early first centuries BC, along with Sicilian and Numidian bronze; it may have been exported there as scrap.

== History of research ==
The first substantial work on Carthaginian numismatics was Ludvig Müller, Numismatique de l'ancienne Afrique, published between 1860 and 1874. Owing to the absence of coin hoards at that time, it was based almost entirely on stylistic features of the coinages, but it established a basic framework for the different metals and remained the standard reference work until the mid-twentieth century. From the 1960s onwards, the large-scale publication of hoards and excavation finds that included Punic hoards began to make the chronology and mints of Carthaginian coinage clearer. In the 1960s and 70s, G. Kenneth Jenkins and R. B. Lewis published a series of important studies that used the new archaeological data and the identification of die sequences to produce the current understanding of the gold, silver, and electrum series. Systematisation of the bronze coinage remains ongoing, drawing on further information from excavations in Sicily and Sardinia, as well as metallurgical studies. Key advances have been made by Paolo Visonà's studies of Punic bronze coinage and its circulation patterns and Suzanne Frey-Kupper's 2013 publication of the coin finds from the excavations at Monte Iato.

=== Collections ===
A collection of recovered coins is maintained at the Tunisian Mint Museum (French: Musée de la Monnaie en Tunisie) at the Central Bank in Tunis. One example of this coinage, used as a bus fare, was donated to Leeds Discovery Centre in 2026.

=== Speculative theories ===
In 2013, Theo Vennemann proposed that the Germanic penny, penning, Pfennig, &c. may derive from an early borrowing of Punic pn (Pane or Pene, "Face"), as the face of Carthaginian fertility goddess Tanit was represented on nearly all Carthaginian currency. The theory is, however, still disputed. The supposed discovery of a hoard of Carthaginian coins on Corvo in 1749 is the basis for supposing that the Carthaginians reached the Azores, but this too remains contentious.

== See also ==
- History of Carthage
- Shekel & Tyrian shekel

== Bibliography ==
- Acquaro, E. (1971). "Sulla lettura di un tipo monetale punico". Rivista Italiana di Numismatica e Scienze Affini. 19: 25–30.
- Bisi, A. M. (1969–1970). "Le monete con leggenda punica e neopunica del Museo Nazionale di Napoli". Annali dell'Istituto Italiano di Numismatica. 16/17: 55–127.
- Bronson, Bennet (November 1976), "Cash, Cannon, and Cowrie Shells: The Nonmodern Moneys of the World", Bulletin, vol. 47, Chicago: Field Museum of Natural History, pp. 3–15.
- Burnett, Andrew (1995). "The Coinage of Punic Sicily during the Hannibalic War". In Caccamo Caltabiano, Maria (ed.). La Sicilia tra l'Egitto e Roma la monetazione siracusana dell'età di Ierone II : atti del seminario di studi, Messina 2-4 dicembre 1993. Messina: Accademia Peloritana. pp. 384–398. ASIN B00F9IJRMK.
- Crawford, Michael Hewson (1985), Coinage and Money under the Roman Republic: Italy and the Mediterranean Economy, The Library of Numismatics, Berkeley: University of California Press, ISBN 0-520-05506-3.
- Cutroni Tusa, Aldina (1991). "Le ultime emissioni di Cartagine in Sicilia". Atti del II Congresso Internazionale di Studi Fenici e Punici, vol. 1. Rome. pp. 271–79.
- Frey-Kupper, Suzanne (2009). "A Stone Mould from Bir Messaouda (Carthage) for Bronze Coins of the Second Punic War. Preliminary Notes". Schweizerische Numismatische Rundschau. 88: 185–91.
- Frey-Kupper, Suzanne (2013). Die antiken Fundmünzen vom Monte Iato: 1971-1990: ein Beitrag zur Geldgeschichte Westsiziliens. Lausanne: Editions du Zebre. ISBN 978-2-940351-16-9.
- Jenkins, G. Kenneth (1971). "Coins of Punic Sicily, Part I". Schweizerische Numismatische Rundschau. 50: 25–.
- Jenkins, G. Kenneth (1974). "Coins of Punic Sicily, Part II". Schweizerische Numismatische Rundschau. 53.
- Jenkins, G. Kenneth (1977). "Coins of Punic Sicily, Part III". Schweizerische Numismatische Rundschau. 56: 5–65.
- Jenkins, G. Kenneth (1978). "Coins of Punic Sicily, Part IV". Schweizerische Numismatische Rundschau. 57: 5–68.
- Jenkins, G. Kenneth; Lewis, Richard Baldwin (1963). Carthaginian Gold and Electrum Coins. London: Royal Numismatic Society.
- Robinson, E. S. G. (1963). "Carthaginian gold and electrum coins. (Special Publications No. 2) by G. K. Jenkins, R. B. Lewis". Numismatic Chronicle. 120: 285–292.
- Robinson, E. S. G. (1964). "Carthaginian and Other South Italian Coinages of the Second Punic War". Numismatic Chronicle. 121: 37–63=4.
- Vennemann, Theo (2013a), "Ne'er-a-Face: A Note on the Etymology of Penny, with an Appendix on the Etymology of Pane", Germania Semitica, Trends in Linguistics: Studies and Monographs, No. 259, Walter de Gruyter, pp. 467–484, ISBN 978-3-11-030094-9.
- Visonà, Paolo (1990). "The Yale Hoard of Punic Bronze Coins from Malta". Rivista di Studi Fenici. 18 (1): 169–92.
- Visonà, Paolo (1998). "Carthaginian Coinage in Perspective". American Journal of Numismatics. 10: 1–27. JSTOR 43580385.
- Visonà, Paolo (2006). "Prolegomena to a Corpus of Carthaginian Bronze Coins". Numismatica e Antichita Classiche. 35: 239–51.
- Vennemann, Theo (2013b), "A Note on the Etymology of Germanic +skellingaz 'Shilling': with an Appendix on Latin Siliqua 'A Small Coin'", Germania Semitica, Walter de Gruyter, pp. 485–496, ISBN 9783110301090.
