= Tyrian shekel =

Ancient currency

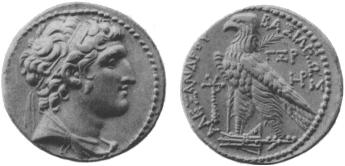
Tyrian shekel of Alexander Balas, 152/1–145 BC

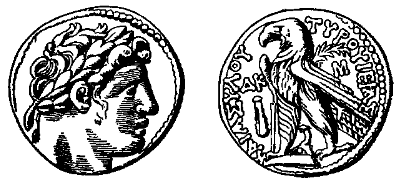
Tyrian shekel with head of Melqart and Tyrou hieras kai asylou text, 102 BC.

Tyrian shekels, tetradrachms, or tetradrachmas were coins of Tyre.

== Description ==
They also bore the Greek inscription ΤΥΡΟΥ ΙΕΡΑΣ ΚΑΙ ΑΣΥΛΟΥ (Týrou hierâs kai asýlou, 'of Tyre the holy [city] and [city] of refuge'). The coins were the size of a modern Israeli half-shekel and were issued by Tyre, in that form, between 126 BC and AD 56. Earlier Tyrian coins with the value of a tetradrachm, bearing various inscriptions and images, had been issued from the second half of the fifth century BC.

After the Roman Empire closed down the mint in Tyre, the Roman authorities allowed the Jewish rabbanim to continue minting Tyrian shekels in Judaea, but with the requirement that the coins should continue to bear the same image and text to avoid objections that the Jews were given autonomy. They were replaced by the First Jewish Revolt coinage in 66 AD.

The Tyrian shekels were considered tetradrachms by the Greeks, as they weighed four Athenian drachmas, about 14 grams, more than earlier 11-gram shekels but regarded as equivalent for religious duties at that time. In ancient Tyre, the weekly wage of a skilled laborer was about 1 shekel.

Metallurgical studies have demonstrated that Tyrian shekels maintained an exceptionally high silver content throughout their entire production period, with a purity level approaching 94-97%. This remarkable consistency in metal quality distinguished them from other ancient silver coins. The exceptional purity helps explain why the Jerusalem Temple priests specifically required Tyrian shekels for Temple tax payments.

The money-changers referenced in the New Testament Gospels (Matt. 21:12 and parallels) provided Tyrian shekels in exchange for Roman currency when this was required.

A Tyrian shekel was featured on the television program Pawn Stars, presented by a seller named Ryan P. The coin was in a polished and cleaned state, which is considered damage under numismatic standards. It sold for $1,600 in the episode, which first aired on February 25, 2013. In the segment, Rick Harrison estimated that the coin might have been worth approximately $5,000 had it not been cleaned.

== See also ==
- History of currency
- List of historical currencies
- Shekel
- Carthaginian shekel, generally roughly half a Tyrian shekel
- Jerusalem shekel
- Bar Kochba shekel
