= Carthaginian coins of Corvo =

Reported 1749 discovery of ancient coins

The Cyrenaic and Carthaginian coins of Corvo are a hoard of coins dating to approximately 200 BCE that were supposedly left in the Azores by Carthaginians and discovered in 1749 on the island of Corvo, the smallest and most remote island of the Azores.

== Podolyn's report ==
The only source of information about the find is a report published in 1778 in Det Götheborgska Wetenskaps och Witterhets Samhallets Handlinger, now known as the Publications of the Royal Society of Sciences and Letters in Gothenburg, by Johan Frans Podolyn, a Portuguese-born Swede. According to Podolyn, in 1761 he met in Madrid the historian and numismatist Enrique Flórez who gave him nine coins from Carthage (two gold and five bronze) and two from Cyrene (bronze), which Flórez said were from a hoard discovered in 1749 in a black pot or vase after being washed out of the foundations of a building by a storm.

== Opinion ==
The coins depicted in Podolyn's report appeared genuine when compared with designs on coins in the possession of the Prince Royal of Denmark, and the influential German historian Alexander von Humboldt fully embraced the account as proof of Carthaginian voyages to the New World. In the 19th century this was repeated as true in Chateaubriand's Autobiography, in Daniel Wilson's The Lost Atlantis, and in encyclopedias including the Encyclopædia Britannica. In 1936 A. W. Brøgger used it as an example in his speech opening the second International Congress of Archaeologists, in which he argued that the Bronze Age was an era of long-distance exploration.

Not all scholars since have accepted Podolyn's statement about the location of the find: the Azores were apparently unknown to ancient geographers and archeological surveys have not uncovered any evidence of European visitations prior to the modern age of exploration. Some have suggested that the coins were a hoax or placed there in a later period, "by Arabs, Normans, Spaniards, or early Portuguese settlers." Patricia and Pierre Bikai suggest that the coins were actually from a town in Portugal named Corvo, where it is plausible that tin ore attracted Carthaginian settlement. They add that if the Carthaginians did reach the Azores the lack of a native population meant that there would not necessarily be any evidence, and "scholars who reject even the possibility of Atlantic voyages in antiquity seem" to be accepting a myth promulgated by the Phoenicians that the Atlantic was inherently impassable with the seafaring technology of the period.

Scholars who postulate pre-Portuguese voyages to the Azores have suggested that the statue of Corvo may also have been of Carthaginian origin, based in part on the discovery of the Corvo coins.

== See also ==
- Carthaginian coins
- History of Carthage
