= Shekel =

Ancient unit of currency

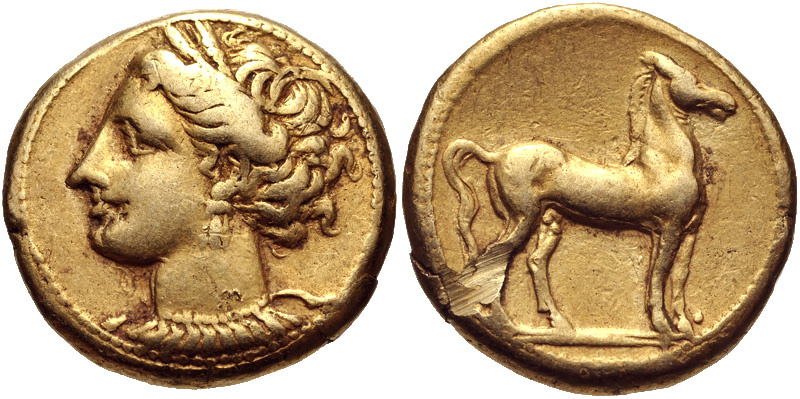
An electrum Carthaginian shekel, c. 310–290 BC, bearing the image of Tanit, consort of Baal Hammon

A shekel or sheqel (Akkadian: 𒅆𒅗𒇻, romanized: šiqlu, siqlu; Ugaritic: 𐎘𐎖𐎍, romanized: ṯiql, Hebrew: שקל, romanized: šeqel, plural Hebrew: שקלים, romanized: šəqālim, Phoenician: 𐤔𐤒𐤋) is an ancient Mesopotamian coin, usually of silver. A shekel was first a unit of weight of a value that varied over time and by issuing authority. It was also used in ancient Tyre, Carthage, Philistia and Hasmonean Judea.

== Name ==
The word shekel is based on the triliteral Proto-Semitic root ṯql, cognate to the Akkadian šiqlu or siqlu, a unit of weight equivalent to the Sumerian gin2. Use of the word was first attested in c. 2150 BC under the reign of Naram-Sin of Akkad, and later in c. 1700 BC in the Code of Hammurabi. The Hebrew reflex of the root šql is found in the Hebrew words for "to weigh" (shaqal), "weight" (mishqal) and "consideration" (shiqqul). It is cognate to the Aramaic root tql and the Arabic root ṯql (ث ق ل, in words such as thiqāl "weight", thāqil "heavy" or mithqal, a unit of weight). The famous writing on the wall in the Book of Daniel includes a cryptic use of the word in Aramaic: "Mene, mene, teqel, u-farsin" (count, count, weigh, and ration).

Shekel came into the English language via the Hebrew Bible, where it is first used in Genesis 23.

The term "shekel" has been used for a unit of weight, around 9.6 or 9.8 grams (0.31 or 0.32 ozt), used in Bronze Age Europe for balance weights and fragments of bronze that may have served as money.

== History ==
The earliest shekels were a unit of weight, used as other units such as grams and troy ounces for trading before the advent of coins. The shekel was common among western Semitic speakers. Israelites, Moabites, Edomites, and Phoenicians used the shekel, although proper coinage developed very late. Carthaginian coinage was based on the shekel and may have preceded its home town of Tyre in issuing proper coins.

Coins were used and may have been invented by the early Anatolian traders who stamped their marks to avoid weighing each time used. Herodotus states that the first coinage was issued by Croesus, King of Lydia, spreading to the golden Daric (worth 20 sigloi or shekel), issued by the Achaemenid Empire and the silver Athenian obol and drachma. Early coins were money stamped with an official seal to certify their weight. Silver ingots, some of them with markings, were issued. Later authorities decided who designed coins.

As with many ancient units, the shekel had a variety of values depending on the era, government and region; weights between 7 and 17 grams and values of 11, 14, and 17 grams are common. A two-shekel weight recently recovered near the temple area in Jerusalem and dated to the period of the First Temple weighs 23 grams, giving a weight of 11.5 grams per shekel in Israel during the monarchy. When used to pay labourers, recorded wages in the ancient world range widely. The Code of Hammurabi (circa 1800 BC) sets the value of unskilled labour at approximately ten shekels per year of work, confirmed in Israelite law by comparing Deut 15:18 with Exod 21:32. Later, records within the Achaemenid Empire (539–333 BC) give ranges from a minimum of two shekels per month for unskilled labour, to as high as seven to ten shekels per month in some records. A subsistence wage for an urban household during the Persian period would have required at least 22 shekels of income per year.

=== Philistia ===
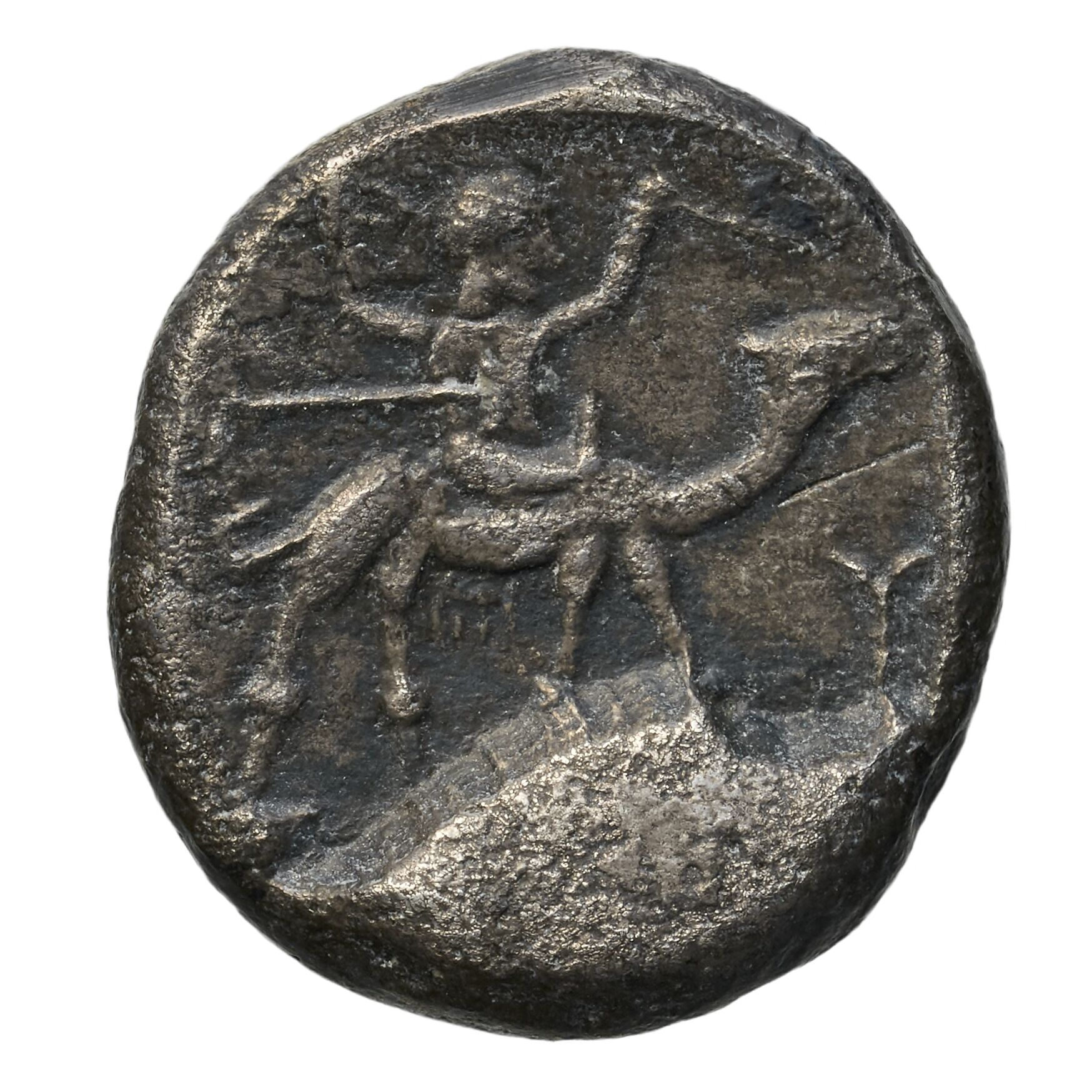
Silver drachma, quarter shekel, minted in Gaza, Palestine (450-331 BC)

The first area in Israel to transition from a bullion to coin monetary exchange system was Philistia in the 5th century BCE. Minting of one sql silver coins with a weight 14.32 grams, also called tetradrachms, was first undertaken in of Ascalon, Isdud and Gaza, three of the cities of the pentapolis, under Achaemenid rule. A quarter of a Philistian sql (or rb' sql, rb' meaning "quarter" in Semitic languages) weighing 3.58 grams, also called a drachm, was also minted. Smaller denominations included the m'h (1/24 sql of 0.60 grams, also called obol), and the half m'h (1/48 sqlof 0.30 grams, also called hemiobol).

=== Israelites ===
Exodus 30:24 notes that the measures of the ingredients for the holy anointing oil were to be calculated using the Shekel of the Sanctuary (see also Exodus 38:24–26, and similarly at Numbers 3:47 for payment for the redemption of 273 first-born males and at Numbers 7:12–88 for the offerings of the leaders of the tribes of Israel), suggesting that there were other common measures of a shekel in use, or at least that the Temple authorities defined a standard for the shekel to be used for Temple purposes.

According to Levitical law, whenever a census of the Israelites was to be conducted, every person that was counted was required to pay the half-shekel for his atonement (Exodus 30:11–16).

The Aramaic tekel, similar to the Hebrew shekel, used during the feast of Belshazzar according to the Book of Daniel and defined as weighed, shares a common root with the word shekel and may even additionally attest to its original usage as a weight.

=== Second Temple period half-Shekel Temple tax ===
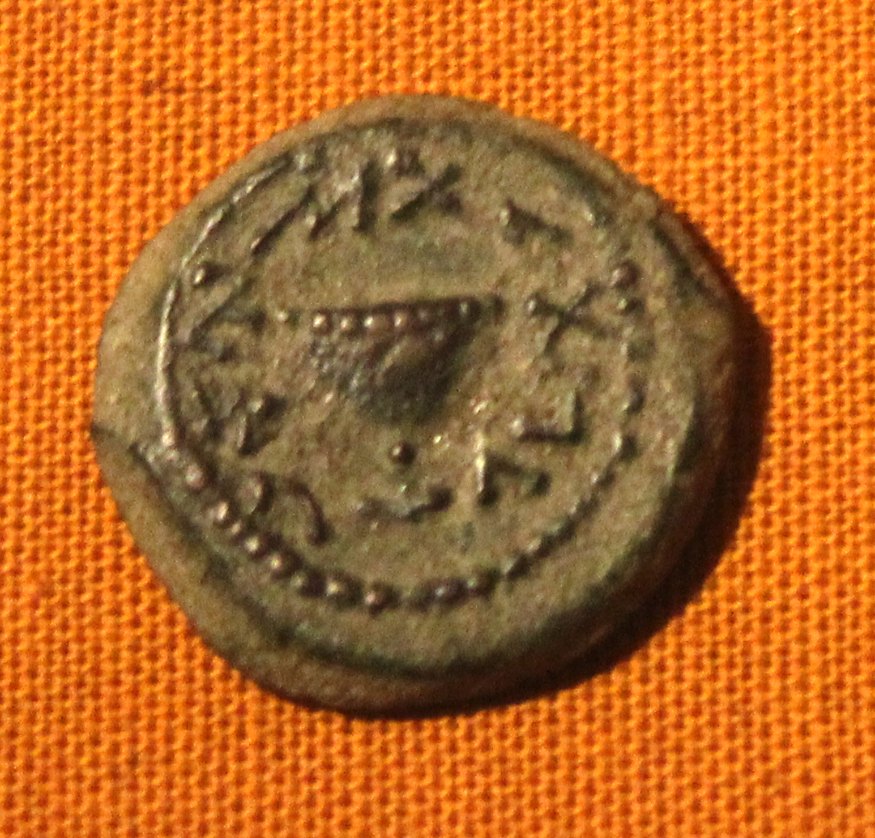
Shekel from the First Jewish–Roman War with the legend לגאלת ציון, "To the redemption of Zion", in Paleo-Hebrew script, at the Rockefeller Archeological Museum

During the Second Temple period, it was customary among Jews to annually offer the half-Shekel into the Temple treasury, for the upkeep and maintenance of the Temple precincts, as also used in purchasing public animal offerings. This practice not only applied to Jews living in the Land of Israel, but also to Jews living outside the Land of Israel. Archaeological excavations conducted at Horvat 'Ethri in Israel from 1999 to 2001 by Boaz Zissu and Amir Ganor of the Israel Antiquities Authority (IAA) have yielded important finds, the most-prized of which being a half-Shekel coin minted in the 2nd century CE, upon which are embossed the words "Half-Shekel" in paleo-Hebrew (Hebrew: חצי השקל). The same coin possesses a silver content of 6.87 grams. According to the Jewish historian Josephus, the annual monetary tribute of the half-Shekel to the Temple at Jerusalem was equivalent to two Athenian drachmæ, each Athenian or Attic drachma weighing a little over 4.3 grams.

=== Jewish–Roman wars ===
The First Jewish Revolt coinage was issued from AD 66 to 70 amid the First Jewish–Roman War as a means of emphasizing the independence of Judea from Roman rule and replacing the Tyrian shekel with its image of a foreign god which had previously been minted to pay the temple tax.

The Bar Kochba shekel was issued from AD 132 to 135 amid the Bar Kokhba revolt for similar reasons.

=== Carthage ===
The Punic or Carthaginian shekel was typically around 7.2 grams in silver and 7.5 grams in gold (suggesting an exchange rate of 12:1). It was apparently first developed in Sicily during the mid-4th century BC. It was associated with the payment of Carthage's mercenary armies and was repeatedly devalued over the course of each of the Punic Wars. The amount and quality of this currency however increased as a result of the Carthaginian Empire's expansion into Spain under the Barcid dynasty before the Second Punic War and recovery under Hannibal before the Third Punic War. Throughout, it was more common for Carthage's holdings in North Africa to employ bronze or no coinage except when paying mercenary armies and for most of the coins to circulate in Iberia, Sardinia, and Sicily.

=== Tyre ===
The Tyrian shekel began to be issued c. 300 BC. Owing to the relative purity of its silver, it became the preferred medium of payment for the Temple tax in Jerusalem. In the New Testament, the "30 pieces of silver" paid by the chief priests to Judas Iscariot in exchange for his betrayal of Jesus may be a reference to the Tyrian shekel.

== Present ==
=== Israel ===
The shekel (sheqel in direct transcription) replaced the Israeli pound (Hebrew: לִירָה, lira) in 1980. Its currency symbol was ⟨⟩, although it was more commonly notated as ש or IS. It was subdivided into 100 new agorot (אגורות חדשות). It was replaced in 1985 by the new shekel, due to hyperinflation. Its currency symbol is ⟨ ₪ ⟩, although it is often notated as ש״ח or NIS. It is subdivided into 100 agorot. Both Israeli shekels are solely units of fiat currency, and not related to the weight of any precious metal. With the 2014 series of notes, the Bank of Israel abandoned the transcriptions Sheqel and Sheqalim in favor of the standard English forms Shekel and Shekels.

== See also ==
- Ancient Mesopotamian units of measurement
- Coins in the Bible
- Gerah (ma'ah)
- Hanukkah gelt
- List of historical currencies
- Pidyon haben
- Prutah
- Tetradrachm
- Zuz
