= Suzanne Frey-Kupper =

Swiss numismatist and archaeologist

Professor Suzanne Frey-Kupper
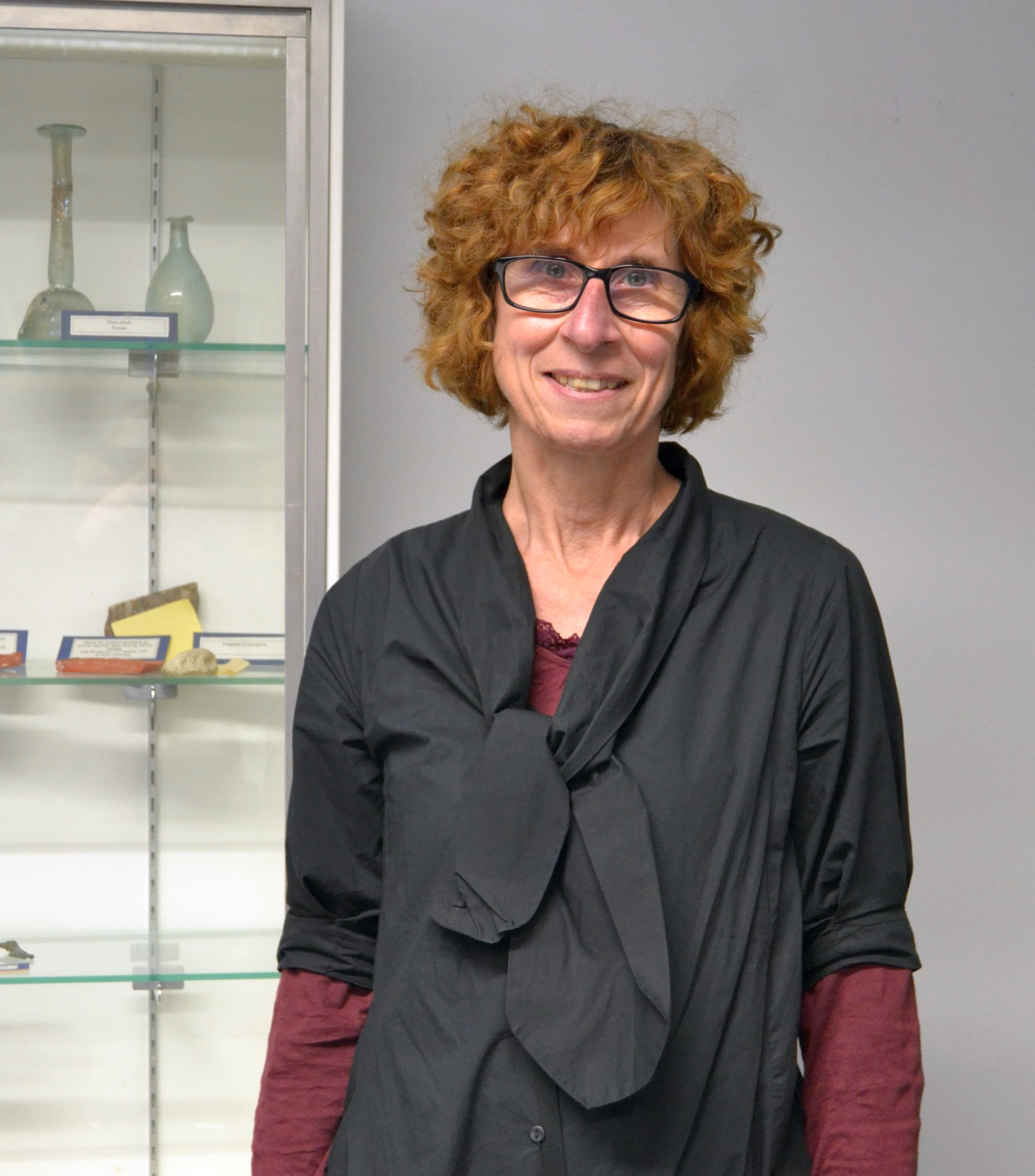
- Born: 1958 (age 67–68); Baden
- Occupations: Classical archaeologist; numismatist

Academic background
- Education: University of Zurich; University of Lausanne

Academic work
- Institutions: University of Warwick

Suzanne Frey-Kupper (born 1958) is a classical archaeologist and numismatist from Switzerland, who is Professor of Classics and Ancient History at the University of Warwick. She specialises in the study of Greek, Roman and Punic coinage, in particular examining their role in historical processes and as social agents.

== Biography ==
Frey-Kupper was born in Baden in 1958. She studied prehistory, archaeology and art history at the University of Zurich. She then studied for a PhD in Ancient History at the University of Lausanne. In 1985 she founded the Swiss Working Group on Coin Finds (SAF/GSETM), which she was the first chair of, and which subsequently led to the creation of the Inventory of Swiss Coin Finds (IFS/ITMS of the Swiss Academy of Humanities and Social Sciences). She has worked on a number of numismatic and archaeological projects, including as a project manager for the archaeological service of the Canton of Bern, at the site and museum of Aventicum, and from 2003 to work on the coinage of Monte Iato in Sicily, funded by the Swiss National Fund for the Promotion of Scientific Research.

From 2007 to 2011 she lectured at the University of Lausanne, before joining the University of Warwick, where, in addition to teaching and research, she is responsible for the department's teaching collection of ancient coins. She has held two Visiting Professorships: first in 2014, at the American Numismatic Society; secondly in 2017, at the Università degli Studi. Her research interests include the study of Greek, Roman and Punic coinage, and, in particular, coins in archaeological contexts, as well as their role in historical processes and as social agents. According to Carolina López-Ruiz, Frey-Kupper's work on coinage at Punic sites emphasised the "importance of paying attention to local contexts", but these contexts do not "undermine the existence of a level of uniformity".

== Awards ==
- Global Contribution Award - University of Warwick (2016)
- Jeton de Vermeil - Société française de numismatique (2024)

== Selected works ==
- Frey-Kupper, Suzanne, with I. Liggi Asperoni and N. Wolfe-Jacot, Aventicum I – Les monnaies de sept sanctuaires romains d’Avenches (ITMS 16) (Berne: Académie suisse des sciences humaines et sociales, Inventaire des trouvailles monétaires suisses - 2018), 236 pp., 44 pl. and database.
- Frey-Kupper, Suzanne, and Clive Stannard. "Evidence for the importation and monetary use of blocks of foreign and obsolete bronze coins in the ancient world." (2018): 283-354.
- Frey-Kupper, S. (2014). Coins and their use in the Punic Mediterranean: Case studies from Carthage to Italy from the fourth to the first century bce. In J. Quinn & N. Vella (Eds.), The Punic Mediterranean: Identities and Identification from Phoenician Settlement to Roman Rule (British School at Rome Studies, pp. 76–110). Cambridge: Cambridge University Press.
- Stannard, Clive, and Suzanne Frey-Kupper. ""Pseudomints" and Small Change in Italy and Sicily in the Late Republic." American Journal of Numismatics (2008): 351-404.
