= Johan Frans Podolyn =

Johan Frans Podolyn or Johann Franz Podolyn (Lisbon 29 May 1739 - Gothenburg 29 May 1784) was a Swedish numismatist who published on Punic currency in his possession which had been found on the island of Corvo in the Azores. He wrote about the discovery in 1778 in a Swedish academic publication now known as the Publications of the Royal Society of Sciences and Letters in Gothenburg, presumably indicating that he was a member of the society.

Podolyn was the son of a Swedish merchant and Vice-Consul. He had a gift for languages and worked for the Alströmer family, accompanying them on voyages in addition to working as a bookkeeper in Gothenburg and Alingsås. He amassed a considerable coin collection. He was married to Anna Norberg; he had been engaged to marry Jeanette Ölander, but she died before the marriage could take place.
