= Timeline of the Second Temple period =

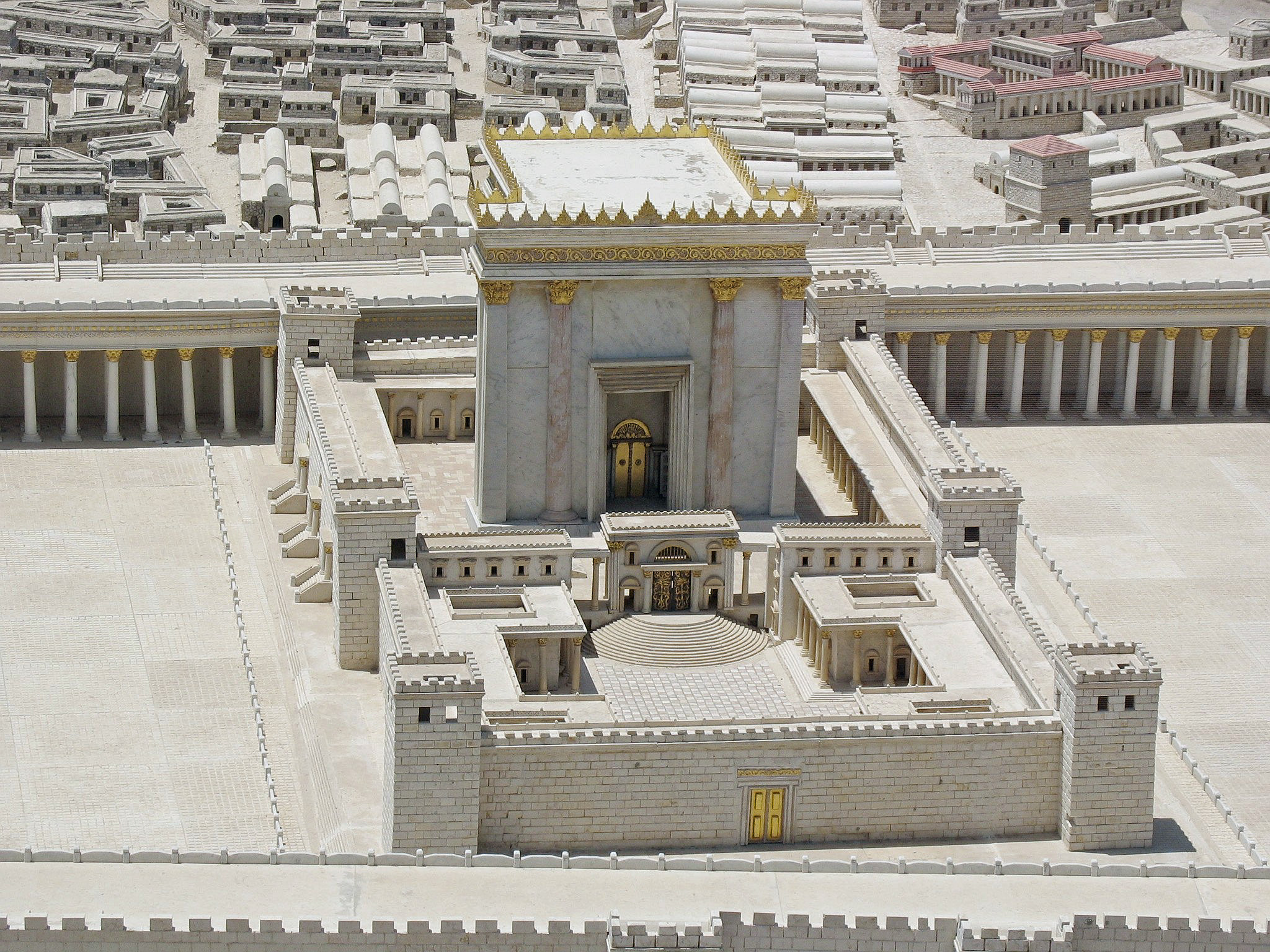
A model of the Second Temple in the time of Herod the Great, from the Holyland Model of Jerusalem at the Israel Museum

The Second Temple period in Jewish history began with the end of the Babylonian captivity and the Persian conquest of the Babylonian Empire in 539 BCE. A new temple to replace the destroyed Solomon's Temple was built in Jerusalem by the returnees, and the Second Temple was finished around 516 BCE. Second Temple Judaism was centered around the religious leadership of the Second Temple, and lasted for six centuries. The Persians were largely tolerant of Judaism. Persian rule lasted for two centuries, but came to an end with the conquests of Macedonia under Alexander the Great in 332 BCE. Judea and the Eastern Mediterranean region came under Greek influence during the resulting Hellenistic period; Hellenistic Judaism blended both Greek and Jewish traditions. Judea was ruled in this period first by the Ptolemaic Kingdom and then by the Seleucid Empire, Greek states formed after the breakup of Alexander's Macedonian empire. The Maccabean Revolt of 167–142 BCE was initially a fight for Judean autonomy against a suppression of traditional Judaism by Seleucid King Antiochus IV, and later sought outright independence from Greek rule. The revolt's success brought about the formation of an independent Hasmonean kingdom of Judea, named for the family which had led the Jewish resistance.

The Hasmoneans ruled until 63 BCE, when they were reduced to client king status as puppets of the Roman Republic. The Hasmonean line was deposed in 37 BCE, and King Herod the Great took control as ruler of the Herodian kingdom, with the approval of Rome. Herod's death in 4 BCE led to both the Herodian Tetrarchy, in which smaller regions were ruled by members of his family, and periods of direct Roman control by the governors of Roman Judea. Direct Roman rule of Judea was generally disliked, and provoked resistance and rebellion. The era came to an end with the First Jewish–Roman War of 66–73 CE. The Jewish revolt against the Roman Empire was unsuccessful, Jerusalem was conquered in 70 CE, and the Second Temple was destroyed.

This timeline focuses both on political events in Judea and the surrounding regions, as well as issues related to wider diaspora Judaism practiced elsewhere. Many of the dates in ancient sources are given in terms of the Seleucid era (SE) and the Ancient Macedonian calendar, which do not always map cleanly to Julian calendar dates, leading to some unavoidable uncertainty.

== Persian Empire (538 BCE – 332 BCE) ==
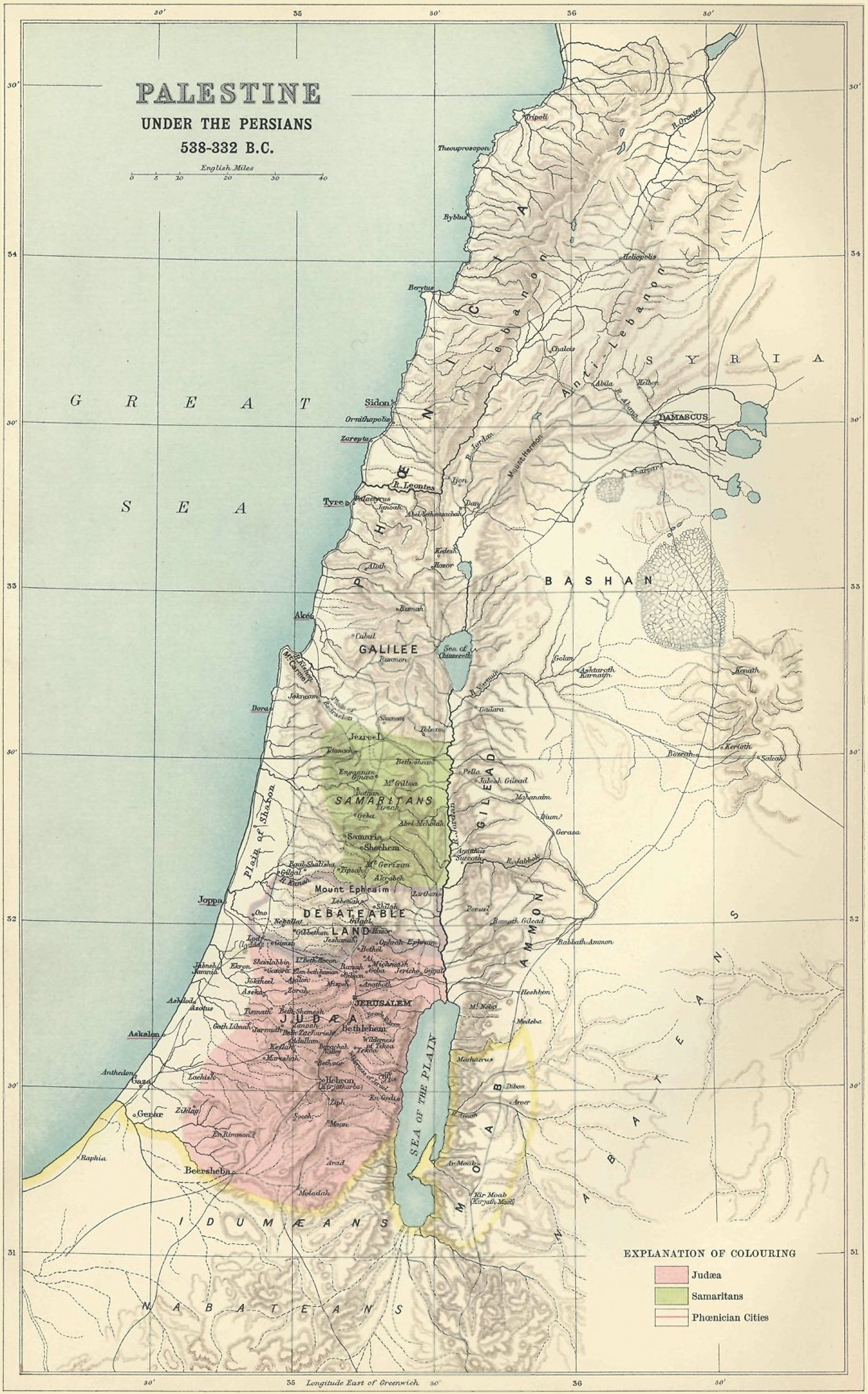
Province of Yehud in the Persian era

539 BCE

- Cyrus the Great of Persia conquers Babylon. The Neo-Babylonian Empire falls and the First Persian Empire takes control of its former territories. (Note: There is an alternative timeline suggested by traditional Jewish sources, largely Seder Olam Rabbah. In it, Cyrus conquers Judea in 371 BCE, and the Persian era lasts only 52 years. Historians reject this timeline, however.)
- Establishment of the Province of Yehud (Judah), part of the satrapy (province) of Eber-Nari.

538 BCE

- Traditional date of the Edict of Cyrus, a decree said to allow and encourage the Jews of the Babylonian captivity to return to Judea. Regardless of whether such an edict directly addressing the Jews existed, Persian religious policy allowed for local religions, including Judaism, to practice undisturbed as long as they do not foment rebellion.
- Possible mission of Sheshbazzar, an enigmatic figure described in Ezra 1. He is credited with returning the temple vessels to Jerusalem, and possibly also being a governor who laid the foundations for the temple in a quoted document in Ezra 5.

538–332 BCE

- At unknown points during the Persian period, various books are written or finalized (if based on earlier, lost material). These include the Book of Malachi, the Books of Chronicles, the Book of Haggai, and the Book of Zechariah. More speculatively, the Book of Jonah, the Book of Ruth, the Song of Songs, and the Book of Job may have been written in the Persian period. Some sections of the Book of Isaiah, notably the third part (chapters 56–66), are probably written. The first two chapters of the Book of Joel are probably written. The date of the final two chapters of Joel is contested, but possibly were also written in the Persian period. Chapters 1–9 of the Book of Proverbs are probably written as a prologue, although the rest of the book likely already existed in some form.
- The proposed priestly source (also known as "P") in the documentary hypothesis makes additions and revisions to the five books of the Torah (Pentateuch), with knowledge of the post-exilic period.
- The setting of the Book of Esther.

537–520 BCE

- Zerubbabel is appointed governor of Yehud. He is said to have led a group of Jewish returnees from Babylon to Yehud. Provisional work on a new temple starts, but is quickly stopped.

525 BCE

- Persian conquest of Egypt: Cambyses expands the Persian Empire further beyond Yehud.

c. 525–410 BCE

- A Jewish military colony and Jewish temple at Elephantine is established, probably by Cambyses to place Persian allies to defend the southern border of Egypt. It is destroyed by worshippers of Khnum in 410 BCE, and while rebuilt a few years afterward, it fades in importance. Later archaeologists find various papyri related to Elephantine preserved by the dry desert climate, making Elephantine one of the better-recorded places of Jewish worship of the era.

522–486 BCE

- Reign of Darius I as shahanshah.

520–516 BCE

- Building of the new temple, the Second Temple, starts in earnest, partially due to the goading of the prophets Haggai and Zechariah.
- Setting of the Book of Haggai and the Book of Zechariah.
- Joshua, son of Jehozadak, of the Zadokite line, becomes High Priest of the newly built Temple.

465–424 BCE

- Reign of Artaxerxes I.

458–457 BCE

- Mission of Ezra the Scribe, who takes another group of returnees from Babylon to Judea with the approval of King Artaxerxes in the seventh year of his reign (if this reference is to Artaxerxes I).

445–433 BCE

- Mission of Nehemiah, a member of Artaxerxes's administration who requests leave to go to Yehud and rebuild it, possibly after some unrecorded disaster in Jerusalem at a point prior. He embarks upon a campaign to purge Judea of foreign influence and builds a wall around Jerusalem.

c. 430–350 BCE

- According to Josephus, at some point in this period, an incident occurs where High Priest Johanan murders his brother Jesus inside the Temple; general Bagoses (possibly the same person as Bagoas, if a later date is assumed) punishes the crime and imposes a seven-year tribute on Judea.

404–359 BCE

- Reign of Artaxerxes II.

397 BCE

- The alternative proposed date of the mission of Ezra the Scribe (if he served under Artaxerxes II).

400–300 BCE

- Ezra–Nehemiah (Book of Ezra and Book of Nehemiah) is written. An early Hebrew form of 1 Esdras, an alternative account, is also possibly created.

359–338 BCE

- Reign of Artaxerxes III.

== Macedonian conquest (332 BCE – 301 BCE) ==
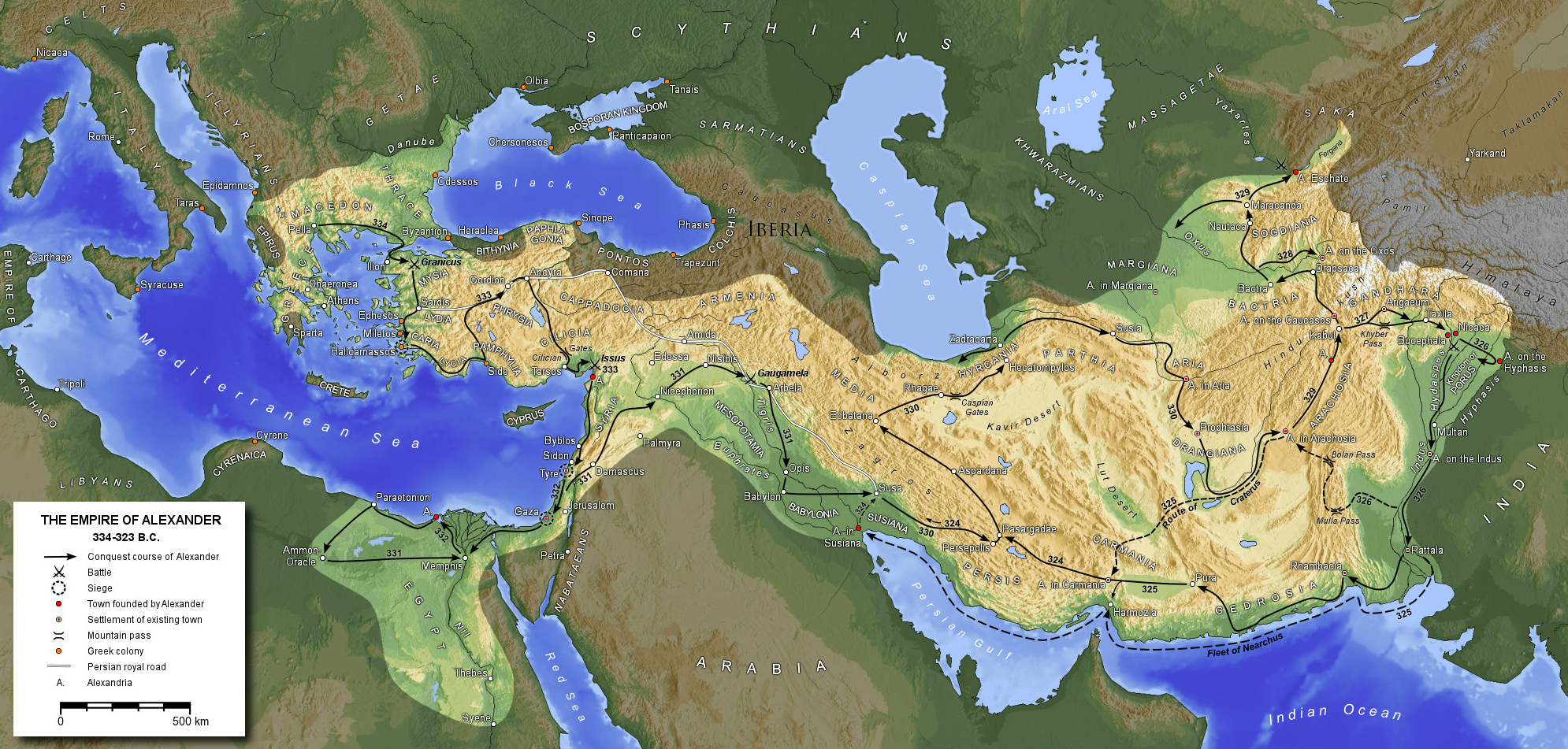
Wars of Alexander the Great and the resulting Macedonian Empire. He conquered the Greater Syria region in 332 BCE.

332 BCE

- Alexander the Great conquers Syro-Palestine.
- According to a Jewish tradition, Alexander visits Jerusalem, corresponds with the Jewish high priest, praises Judaism, and makes a sacrifice to the God of Israel. The tradition is considered legendary and not historical, however.

331 BCE

- Alexander's appointed governor of Syria, a person named Andromachus, is killed, possibly in a revolt by Samaritans. The assassins are executed and the city of Samaria is captured, and a colony of Macedonian military settlers are sent to live there.

323–301 BCE

- Alexander the Great dies. His generals partition the Macedonian empire between them.
- Wars of the Diadochi: Alexander's feuding generals fight each other for control.
- Little is known of affairs of Judea in this period, but it was fought over and suffered. General Ptolemy's forces triumph at the nearby Battle of Gaza (312 BCE), but are forced to retreat from the Antigonid prince Demetrius after a loss in Syria, and burn many cities in the Palestine region in the retreat (Joppa, Acre, Gaza), giving the region back to the Antigonids. Ptolemy officially claims the titles of basileus (king) and pharaoh in 305 BCE. He retakes most of the Palestine region without a fight in 302–301 BCE. The region is awarded to Seleucus after a settlement among the victors at the Battle of Ipsus, but Ptolemy ignores the settlement and refuses to hand it over.
- There is a migration of Jews from Palestine to Egypt amid the chaos, possibly prompted by Ptolemy.

== Ptolemaic Kingdom (301 BCE – 199 BCE) ==
The Ptolemaic Kingdom in the 3rd century BCE

301–200 BCE

- Coele-Syria, including Judea, is ruled by Ptolemaic Egypt. The Seleucid Empire, claiming that the region was awarded to Seleucus, attempts to conquer the region several times during the Syrian Wars.
- Hellenistic Judaism slowly arises, a result of a gradual process of hellenization as Greek culture and language spread. It blends both Greek and Jewish cultural and religious traditions.
- Origin of the Septuagint: During this century, important Jewish writings begin to be translated into Greek for Hellenistic Jews whose first language is Greek.
- Book of Tobit is probably written. It is possible it dates from even earlier, however.
- The Book of Ecclesiastes (Hebrew: Qohelet) and the initial sections of the Book of Enoch are written at some point in this period.
- The Aramaic Levi Document, a Jewish predecessor of the Christian Testament of Levi, is possibly written.
- The Tobiad clan becomes wealthy as tax agents for the Ptolemies.

259 BCE

- Zenon of Kaunos, a Ptolemaic minister of finance, tours the Palestine region; his compiled documents ("Zenon papyri") are later discovered in the 20th century, and are some of the rare surviving material on Jews in the region.

221–204 BCE

- Reign of Ptolemy IV Philopator in Egypt. His reign is the setting of the book 3 Maccabees, which describes a persecution of Egyptian Jews by Philopator after he returned from the Battle of Raphia (217 BCE); the historicity of such an event is highly suspect, however, and it is described nowhere else. Another source, the "Raphia Decree", indicates Ptolemy IV did go on a tour of shrines in the Syro-Palestine region, and he may well have stopped at Jerusalem's Second Temple.

c. 210s–190s BCE

- Probable term of Simon II as High Priest.

202–199 BCE

- Fifth Syrian War: The region changes hands several times as Ptolemaic and Seleucid forces battle for control of Coele-Syria.

== Seleucid Empire (199 BCE – 141 BCE) ==
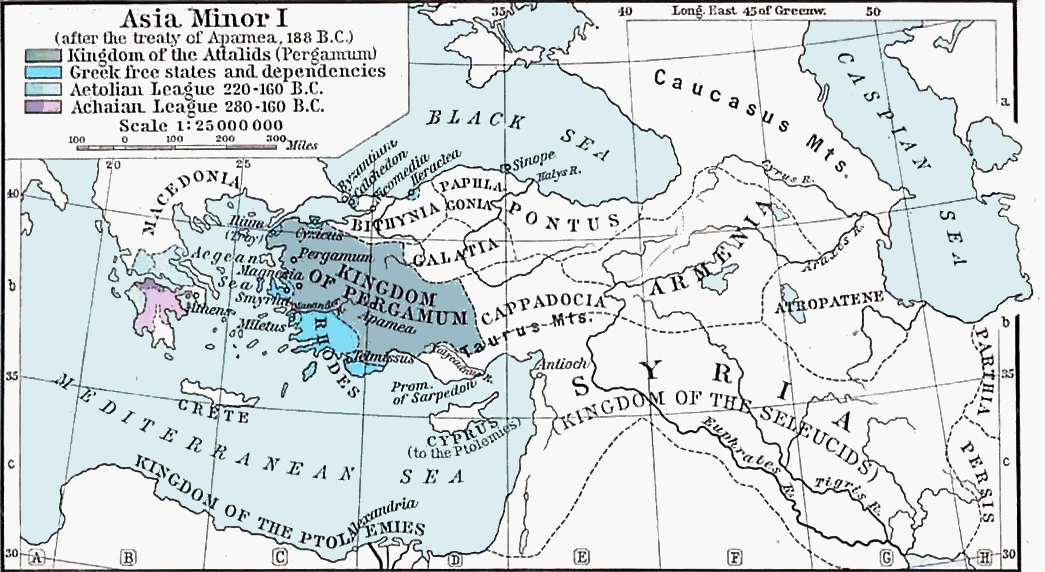
The Seleucid Empire ("Syria" in this map) in 188 BCE, after seeing its territory in Asia Minor reduced after the Treaty of Apamea

200 BCE

- At the Battle of Panium (also known as the Battle of Paneas), the Seleucid army decisively defeats the Ptolemaic army.
- Antiochus III and the Seleucid army conquers Jerusalem, defeating the Ptolemaic garrison led by Scopas.
- Antiochus III makes a decree guaranteeing privileges allowed to Jerusalem's elites and Temple personnel.

200–100 BCE

- The Letter of Aristeas is written.

c. 200–175 BCE

- Book of Sirach (Greek: Ecclesiasticus) by Jesus ben Sira is written.

187–175 BCE

- Seleucus IV Philopator rules as king. At some point, his minister Heliodorus attempts to tax the Second Temple for money after hearing rumors of its wealth, but fails.
- Onias III serves as High Priest.

September 175 BCE

- Antiochus IV Epiphanes ascends to the Seleucid throne.
- Shortly after, Onias III is replaced by his brother Jason as High Priest by Antiochus IV. Jason obtains permission to found a Hellenistic community in Jerusalem.

c. 174–172 BCE

- Antiochus IV visits Jerusalem, where he receives an enthusiastic welcome from Jason.

c. 173–172 BCE

- Menelaus is appointed High Priest. Former High Priest Jason flees into exile in Ammon, possibly to Tobiad territory.

c. 170 BCE

- Former High Priest Onias III is killed at Daphne, near Antioch.

170–169 BCE

- Sixth Syrian War: Antiochus IV Epiphanes defeats Ptolemaic Egypt in campaign.

168 BCE

- Battle of Pydna: Roman troops under Aemilius Paullus win a crushing victory over the Macedonian army, break the power of the Antigonid dynasty, and conquer Macedonia. The defeat of this rival further increases Roman sway and influence in the Eastern Mediterranean.
- Sixth Syrian War: Antiochus Epiphanes returns to Egypt for a second campaign, but leaves in July 168 BCE after a Roman show of support for the Ptolemies.
- Antiochus IV plunders the Second Temple for treasure with the aid of High Priest Menelaus. (Sources conflict for whether this was after the first 169 BCE expedition or the second 168 BCE expedition.)

168–167 BCE

- Unrest roils Jerusalem. Jason returns from exile and attempts to oust Menelaus for the position of High Priest. Possibly, rebels take the city. Jerusalem is attacked by the Seleucid army; many Jerusalemites are killed or enslaved; the Acra citadel is raised and fortified in Jerusalem; and Menelaus is restored to his position. Antiochus IV issues several decrees aimed at curtailing the practice of traditional Judaism, beginning a period of persecution.

=== Maccabean Revolt (167 BCE – 141 BCE) ===
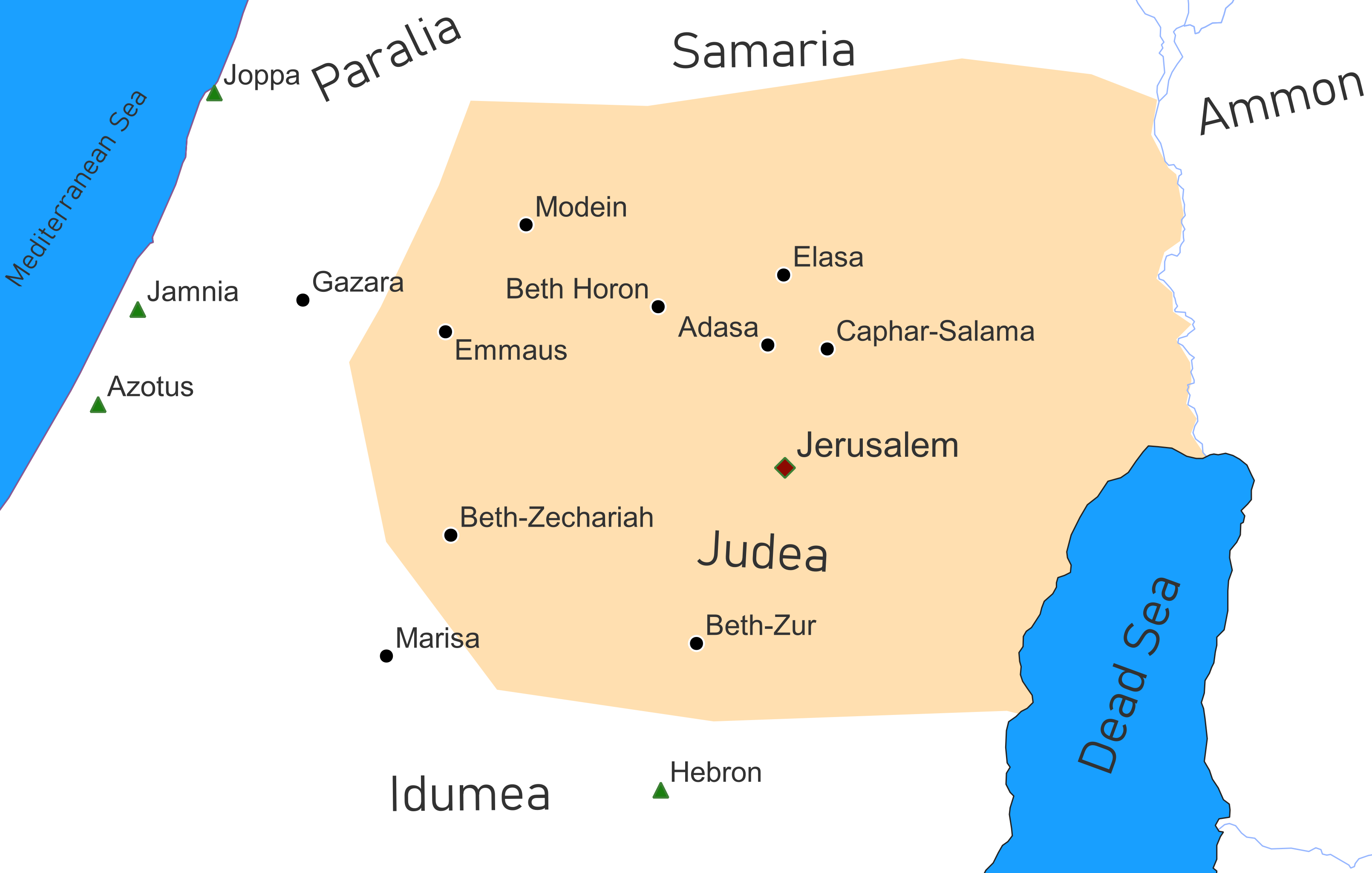
The sites of various battles in Judea during the Maccabean Revolt against the Seleucid Empire

168–100 BCE

- Authorship of various books that seem to be familiar with the persecution of Antiochus IV, including the Book of Jubilees and the Book of Baruch. Suggested dates for Jubilees include c. 168 BCE, 161–140 BCE, and 125 BCE.

December 167 BCE (15 Kislev 145 SE)

- The "Abomination of Desolation" is set up in the Second Temple, and the tamid (daily sacrifice) ceases, profaning the Temple in the eyes of devout Jews. (Note: There is an alternative school of thought that moves up most events in the Maccabean Revolt by a year in the Julian calendar – so the Abomination of Desolation is 168 BCE, the Temple cult resumes in 165 BCE, Judas dies at Elasa in 161 BCE, etc. This is due to conflicting interpretations of Seleucid era (SE) dates, which used a different starting count in Babylonia and Judea than in Macedonia and Egypt, and can be interpreted as having the year count start from spring 312 BCE, autumn 312 BCE, or spring 311 BCE. This article largely uses Elias Bickerman's 1937 translation of SE dates to Julian dates as the scholarly standard, but see Lester L. Grabbe for an example of a stance that prefers the other view.)

167–160 BCE

- The Book of Enoch expands to include the "Apocalypse of Weeks" (chapters 91–93), likely written early in the persecution (c. 167 BCE), as well as the "Book of Dreams" and "Animal Apocalypse" (chapters 83–90), likely written later in the Revolt.

167–165 BCE

- The Book of Daniel, or at least chapters 1 and 7–12, is written at some point after Antiochus IV's anti-Jewish decrees, but before news of his death reaches Judea. It is the last work to be included in the main canon of the Tanakh (Hebrew Scriptures).

c. 166 BCE

- Mattathias, a priest in rural Modein, kills a Seleucid official and Jew who had obeyed the decree, then flees into the wilderness with his family to lead a band of rebels.

Spring 166 – Spring 165 BCE (146 SE)

- Death of Mattathias, the head of the Hasmonean family. His son Judas Maccabeus takes leadership of the rebellion.
- Battle with Apollonius and Battle with Seron are won by Judas Maccabeus's rebels.

End of summer 165 BCE

- Antiochus IV Epiphanes leaves to the east for an expedition to the Upper Satrapies (Babylonia and Persia).
- Battle of Emmaus: Judas Maccabeus defeats a Seleucid military expedition via a daring night march and surprise attack.

October – December 164 BCE

- Lysias, a Seleucid official that Antiochus IV seems to have left in charge of the western part of the empire while he was on campaign in the east, launches his first military expedition to Judea. The Battle of Beth-Zur is fought, which ends inconclusively. The Seleucid force returns to Antioch.

November – December 164 BCE

- Antiochus IV Epiphanes dies in Persia, either in Isfahan or in Elymais. When news reaches Antioch, he is succeeded by his young son Antiochus V Eupator.

January 14, 163 BCE (25 Kislev 148 SE)

- Purification of the Second Temple after the rebels take Jerusalem; the Abomination of Desolation is removed. This becomes the origin of the festival of Hanukkah.

163 BCE

- Maccabee campaigns of 163 BCE: The Maccabees send forces into the regions adjoining Judea.

163–162 BCE

- High Priest Menelaus is executed at Lysias's order in Aleppo.
- Alcimus is appointed as Menelaus's replacement as High Priest, possibly on a temporary basis; he is confirmed by Demetrius I in 161 BCE.
- Onias IV, the successor to the Zadokite line of High Priests, flees to exile in Ptolemaic Egypt.

April – May 162 BCE

- The Maccabees besiege the Acra in Jerusalem, which was still held by forces hostile to the Hasmoneans despite their entry into Jerusalem in 163 BCE.
- Lysias's second expedition. Beth Zur is besieged again and taken. The Battle of Beth Zechariah ends in Seleucid victory. The Acra is relieved.

June – July 162 BCE

- Lysias and the Maccabees agree to another peace treaty (possibly the second document in 2 Maccabees 11). Lysias returns to Antioch.

Late Summer – Autumn 162 BCE

- Seleucid war elephants are hamstrung by a Roman delegation enforcing the Treaty of Apamea.

November 162 BCE

- Demetrius I takes the Seleucid throne as king. Antiochus V and Lysias are executed.

November – Winter 161 BCE

- Nicanor is appointed governor in Jerusalem and negotiates with the Maccabees. Alcimus complains to King Demetrius, and negotiations are undermined. The Maccabees prevail at the Battle of Caphar-salama, a skirmish with Nicanor's forces.
- Timarchus declares himself king in the eastern satrapies of the Seleucid Empire; Demetrius sends armies east to respond.

13 Adar (March) 161 BCE

- Battle of Adasa: Judas's army defeats Nicanor's army; Nicanor is killed.

Spring 161 BCE

- The Maccabees and the Roman Republic hold negotiations and form a tentative pact of mutual aid.

Early 160 BCE

- Demetrius defeats Timarchus's revolt in the eastern half of the Seleucid Empire.

Nisan (April) 160 BCE

- Battle of Elasa: A Seleucid army under Bacchides defeats the Maccabees. Judas Maccabeus dies in the battle.

c. 160–159 BCE

- Death of John Gaddi, the eldest son of Mattathias.

c. 160–157 BCE

- Writings of the Jewish Hellenistic historian Eupolemus. (Not to be confused with the writings of Pseudo-Eupolemus, generally thought to be a Hellenized Samaritan writing at some point in 150–100 BCE.)

160–152 BCE

- Seleucid control is restored over the major cities of Judea. Leadership of the rebels passes to Judas's brother, Jonathan Apphus. The Maccabees retreat to the countryside.

Sivan (May) 159 BCE

- Death of High Priest Alcimus. His successor as High Priest is either unknown (possibly the Righteous Teacher) or the position was left vacant.

157 BCE

- Another peace treaty between the Seleucids and Jonathan's rebels; General Bacchides returns to Antioch and discontinues his anti-Maccabee campaign.

153 BCE

- Start of the Seleucid Dynastic Wars. Rome and Pergamon support Alexander Balas launching a revolt against King Demetrius I.

Autumn 152 BCE

- Seleucid royal claimant Alexander Balas makes a deal with Jonathan Apphus, appointing him High Priest of Israel.

c. 150 BCE

- Demetrius I dies; Alexander Balas takes control of the full Seleucid Empire.

147–145 BCE

- Demetrius II, the son of Demetrius I, challenges Alexander Balas for rule of the Seleucid Empire. Balas dies in 145 BCE after the Battle of the Oenoparus.

147–143 BCE

- Taking advantage of the Seleucid internal conflict, the Maccabees take Beth Zur and Joppa.

c. 145 BCE

- Temple of Onias opened by Onias IV in Egypt as a rival to Temple in Jerusalem.

143 BCE

- Diodotus Tryphon, a leader supporting the claim of Antiochus VI Dionysus (a son of Alexander Balas) to the throne, captures Jonathan Apphus and executes him. Simon Thassi, Jonathan's brother, switches sides and supports Demetrius II against Tryphon.

142 BCE

- A letter from Demetrius II promises autonomy for Judea.
- A new treaty between Judea and the Roman Republic, at least according to a circular letter said to be negotiated by an embassy of Simon to the Roman Senate.

== Hasmonean kingdom (141 BCE – 37 BCE) ==
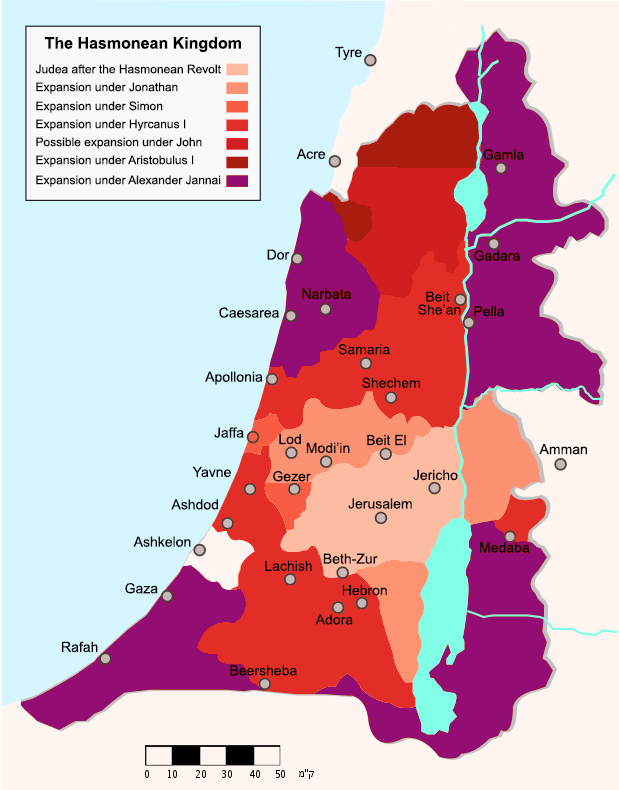
Map of the expanding territory of the Hasmonean kingdom

c. 143–141 BCE

- The Acra citadel in Jerusalem, a stronghold of Greek influence, falls to the nascent Hasmonean state.
- The fortress of Gezer falls to the Hasmoneans.
- Simon Thassi takes formal control of the nascent independent Hasmonean state in 170 SE. He takes the title of ethnarch (prince, governor) of Judea in addition to the High Priesthood.

141–100 BCE

- The three Jewish sects described by Josephus—the Sadducees, Pharisees, and Essenes—develop their ideologies and become well-formed.

141–120 BCE

- Seleucid–Parthian Wars: The Parthian Empire begins its conquest of Babylonia from the Seleucid Empire around 141 BCE. While the region is contested for the next 20 years, Parthian rule eventually becomes secure.
- Little is known directly of the Babylonian Jews under Parthian rule (c. 140 BCE – 224 CE), but there appear to have been at least some assimilated Jews of high rank and status in Parthia. Some Babylonian Jews prospered as traders in the silk trade between Rome and Eastern Asia, where their connections with Jews in Judea and elsewhere aided their travels.

18 Elul 140 BCE (172 SE)

- A stela is erected confirming Simon in his position by approval of the people, and declaring him "High Priest and Leader forever".

c. 140–138 BCE

- King Demetrius II is taken prisoner in a campaign against the Parthian Empire to the east. Leadership of the Seleucid Empire is contested between Diodotus Tryphon and Antiochus VII Sidetes.

139 BCE

- According to Valerius Maximus, Cornelius Scipio Hispanus expels Jews from the city of Rome on the charge of being astrologers and overturns their "private altars". Either the expulsion was not complete, Jews quickly return, or both, however.

c. 138 BCE

- A Seleucid army under a commander named Cendebeus invades Judea, but is repulsed.

Shebat (February), 135 or 134 BCE (177 SE)

- Death of Simon Thassi and two of his sons at the hands of Ptolemy son of Abubus, the governor of Jericho, in 177 SE. Simon is succeeded by his son John Hyrcanus.

134–104 BCE

- Reign of John Hyrcanus.
- The books 1 Maccabees and the Book of Judith are probably written.

Autumn 134 BCE

- Antiochus VII Sidetes and his Seleucid army undertake a siege of Jerusalem. John Hyrcanus capitulates and resumes an alliance after paying a ransom.

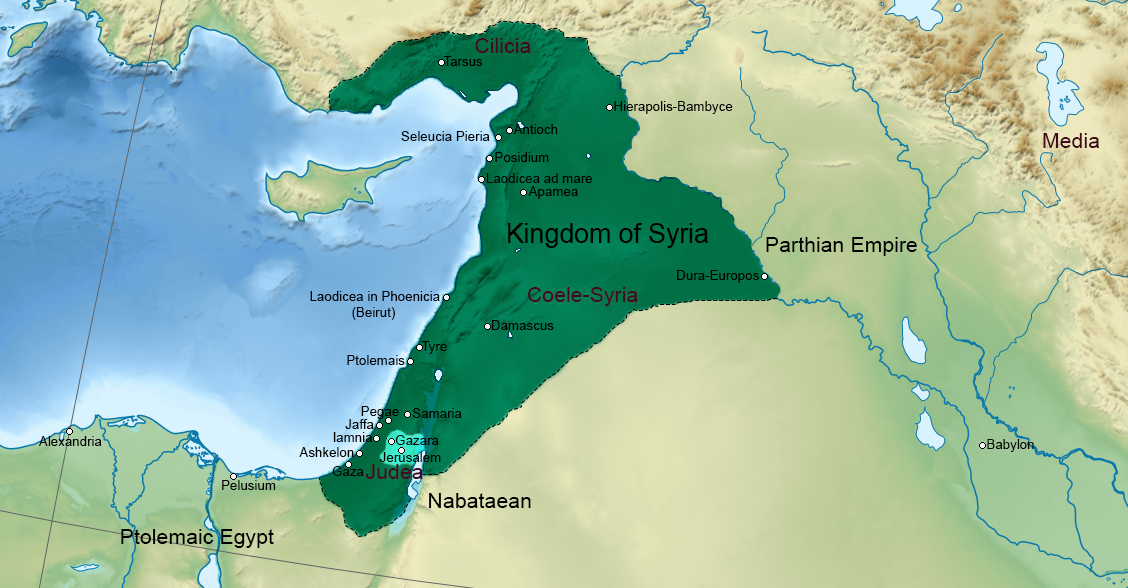
The Hasmonean state and the Seleucid Empire around 129 BCE, under John Hyrcanus and Antiochus VII Sidetes

131–129 BCE

- Under the terms of the alliance, John Hyrcanus leads an army east to fight the Parthians as allies of Antiochus VII.

129 BCE

- Death of Antiochus VII Sidetes. Both the Seleucids and Ptolemies are distracted by leadership disputes. John Hyrcanus and his army return to Jerusalem from the campaign in the east. The suzerainty of Judea to the Seleucid Empire is broken for the last time.

128–122 BCE

- Expansion of the kingdom under John Hyrcanus, largely into Idumea to the south of Judea. Madaba, Adora, and Marisa captured, among others. Idumeans are compelled to convert to Judaism. The Samaritan temple at Mount Gerizim is conquered and destroyed.

124–76 BCE

- The book 2 Maccabees in its modern form is compiled. (Or, if written earlier, the two introductory letters are appended at this point, due to a reference to 124 BCE in one of the letters.)

c. 113–112 BCE

- Possibly, a conflict with King Antiochus IX of the Seleucid Empire over control of the coastal region and Joppa. John Hyrcanus sends an embassy to Rome demanding his territory restored and a cessation of a Seleucid embargo on Judean exports.

c. 111–107 BCE

- Renewed conflict with the Samaritans. Hyrcanus's forces conquer parts of Galilee, including Scythopolis. The city of Samaria is destroyed around 107 BCE.

c. 108–107 BCE

- The Testaments of the Twelve Patriarchs is written, or at least its main core and earliest form.

104–103 BCE

- Reign of Aristobulus I, said to be the first Hasmonean ruler to take the title basileus (king) in addition to the High Priesthood. The Hasmonean kingdom conquers Iturea, the territory to the northeast of Galilee.

103–76 BCE

- Reign of Alexander Jannaeus; territorial expansion of the Hasmonean kingdom to its greatest extent.

103–101 BCE

- War of Scepters: Alexander Jannaeus attempts to take the city Ptolemais Akko. Ptolemy IX Soter II ("Lathyros"), then ruler of Cyprus, sails to its defense and defeats the Hasmoneans in battle. Wary of a rival for leadership of the Ptolemaic Kingdom gaining a foothold, Cleopatra III also invades. Jannaeus acknowledges Cleopatra's rule of Ptolemais, forms an alliance with her, and Ptolemy IX is forced to retreat.

101–100 BCE

- Acquisition of Gadara, Amathus, Raphia, Anthedon, and Gaza by the Hasmonean kingdom.

100 BCE – 40 CE

- 3 Maccabees is written in Egypt, either in the late Ptolemaic period (100–30 BCE) or in the Roman period (30 BCE and after).

100 BCE – 68 CE

- Qumran is inhabited by a community of around 200 people, with one settlement lasting from around 100 BCE to 31 BCE before an earthquake disrupted it, and another phase lasting from around 1 CE to 68 CE before being dispersed by a Roman army suppressing the Jewish revolt. The community is speculated to be Essenes, or at least influenced by them. The Qumran community becomes of interest to later scholars due to the discovery of the Dead Sea Scrolls in Qumran in 1946, the most ancient surviving set of Jewish manuscripts.

c. 93–87 BCE

- An unsuccessful revolt against Jannaeus's rule by his domestic opponents.

89–88 BCE

- War between Alexander Jannaeus and Demetrius III, possibly both at the invitation of Jannaeus's internal opponents and as a reprisal for Hasmonean incursions on Seleucid territory. Demetrius III eventually retreats to Damascus.
- Jannaeus executes his internal opponents and their families who had supported Demetrius III.

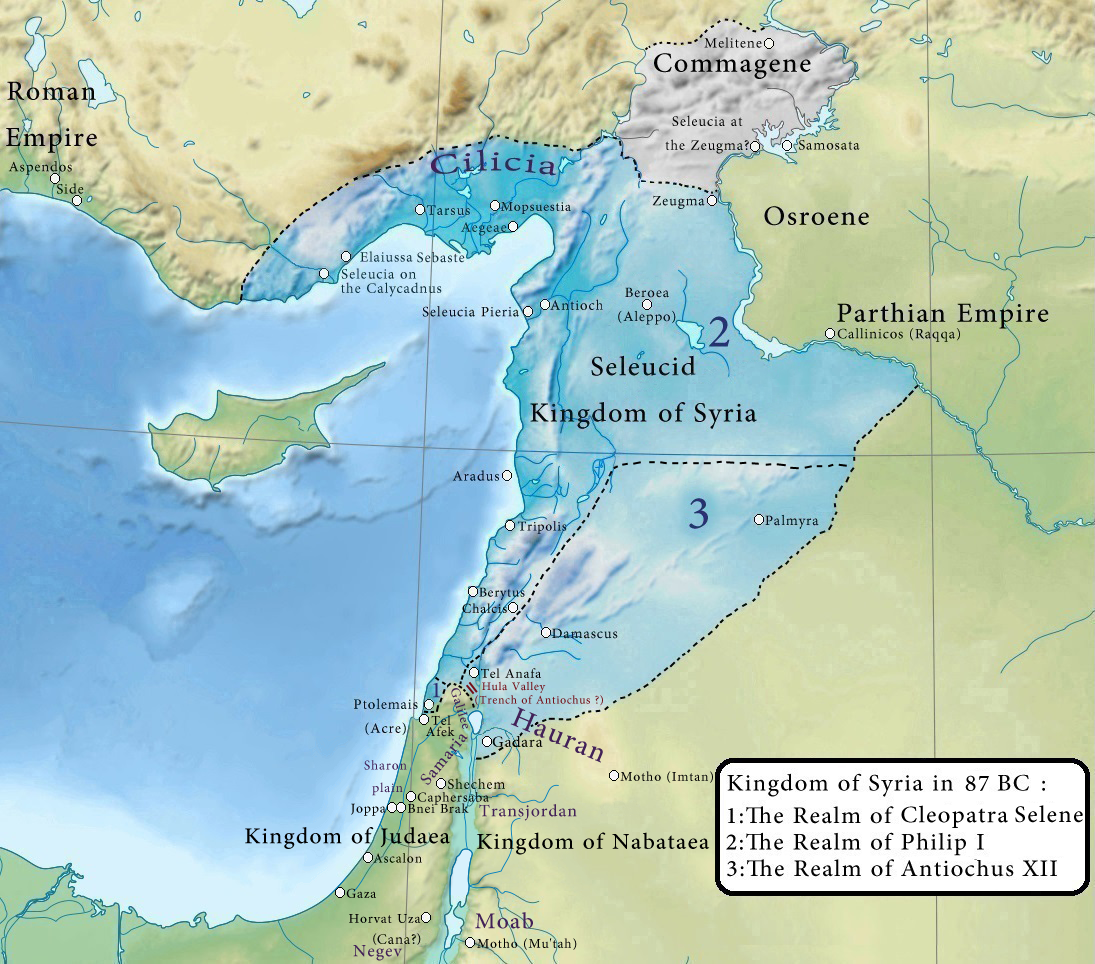
The Levant around 87 BCE. Alexander Jannaeus rules an expanded Hasmonean kingdom, with authority over Judea, Idumea, Galilee, and parts of the coastal plain. The Seleucid Empire remains stricken by infighting, with Cleopatra Selene, Antiochus XII, and Philip I all holding territory in Syria.

c. 87 BCE

- King Tigranes of Armenia invades Parthian Babylonia. According to a rabbinic tradition, he also was threatening Palestine, and the Parthians sent an embassy to Alexander Jannaeus to coordinate a joint defensive effort against Tigranes. According to later Armenian histories, some number of Jews are brought to Armenia in the conflict: the first Armenian Jews.

86 BCE

- An army of King Antiochus XII of the Seleucid Empire passes through Judea on the way to a campaign against the Nabateans (Arabs). Jannaeus orders the construction of a defensive line to deter a Seleucid occupation. Antiochus XII is killed in battle against the Nabateans. Aretas III of Nabatea briefly invades Judea, but comes to terms with Jannaeus.

76–67 BCE

- Reign of Salome Alexandra as Queen. Later histories generally praise her rule for its stability and peace.

67–63 BCE

- Hasmonean civil war: There is a split between the sons of Alexander Jannaeus and Salome Alexandra, Hyrcanus II and Aristobulus II. Hyrcanus II initially succeeds to the throne as High Priest, but Aristobulus II gains the support of the Hasmonean army and contests his brother for leadership. Hyrcanus II at first accepts a powerless ceremonial position, and later flees into exile at the advice of Antipater the Idumaean where he gains the support of Aretas III of Nabatea. Both brothers appeal to the Roman Republic to settle the dispute.

Spring – Summer 63 BCE

- Siege of Jerusalem: Pompey conquers Jerusalem from Aristobulus II's followers and enters the Temple. The Hasmonean kingdom becomes a client state of Rome, with Hyrcanus II restored as high priest. Antipater becomes an influential advisor. The area of the Hasmonean state is reduced, losing control of the coastal region. It is placed under the authority of the governor of Roman Syria.

63–40 BCE

- Tenure of Hyrcanus II as High Priest, although not as basileus.
- The Psalms of Solomon are written.

57–54 BCE

- Gabinius, a former consul and ally of Pompey, serves as Roman governor of Syria. He reorganizes Judea into five administrative districts, each with its own council or court (Sanhedrin), perhaps as an excuse to install Roman-compliant councils to supersede the old Hasmonean Sanhedrin in Jerusalem. These changes do not seem to last, probably due to their unpopularity and resulting revolts.

c. 56–55 BCE

- Aristobulus II and his son Antigonus II Mattathias escape from being held hostage in Rome, reunite with Aristobulus's son Alexander, and resume an anti-Roman rebellion. They are defeated and captured again. Aristobulus's son Alexander is released in a peace deal, revolts again, and is defeated again.

c. 54–53 BCE

- Crassus, as Roman governor of Syria and Judea, loots the Second Temple for money to help pay for an ill-fated military campaign against the Parthian Empire.

48 BCE

- After Pompey's death during Caesar's civil war, Hyrcanus II is raised to the position of ethnarch (governor) in addition to the high priesthood as a reward for siding with Julius Caesar. Antipater is given Roman citizenship and the title of procurator (governor) of Judea.

43–42 BCE

- Civil unrest: Antipater is poisoned by a rival named Malichus and dies. Antipater's son Herod executes Malichus, but faces revolts led by Antigonus II, son of Aristobulus II. Herod and his elder brother Phasael defeat these attempts.

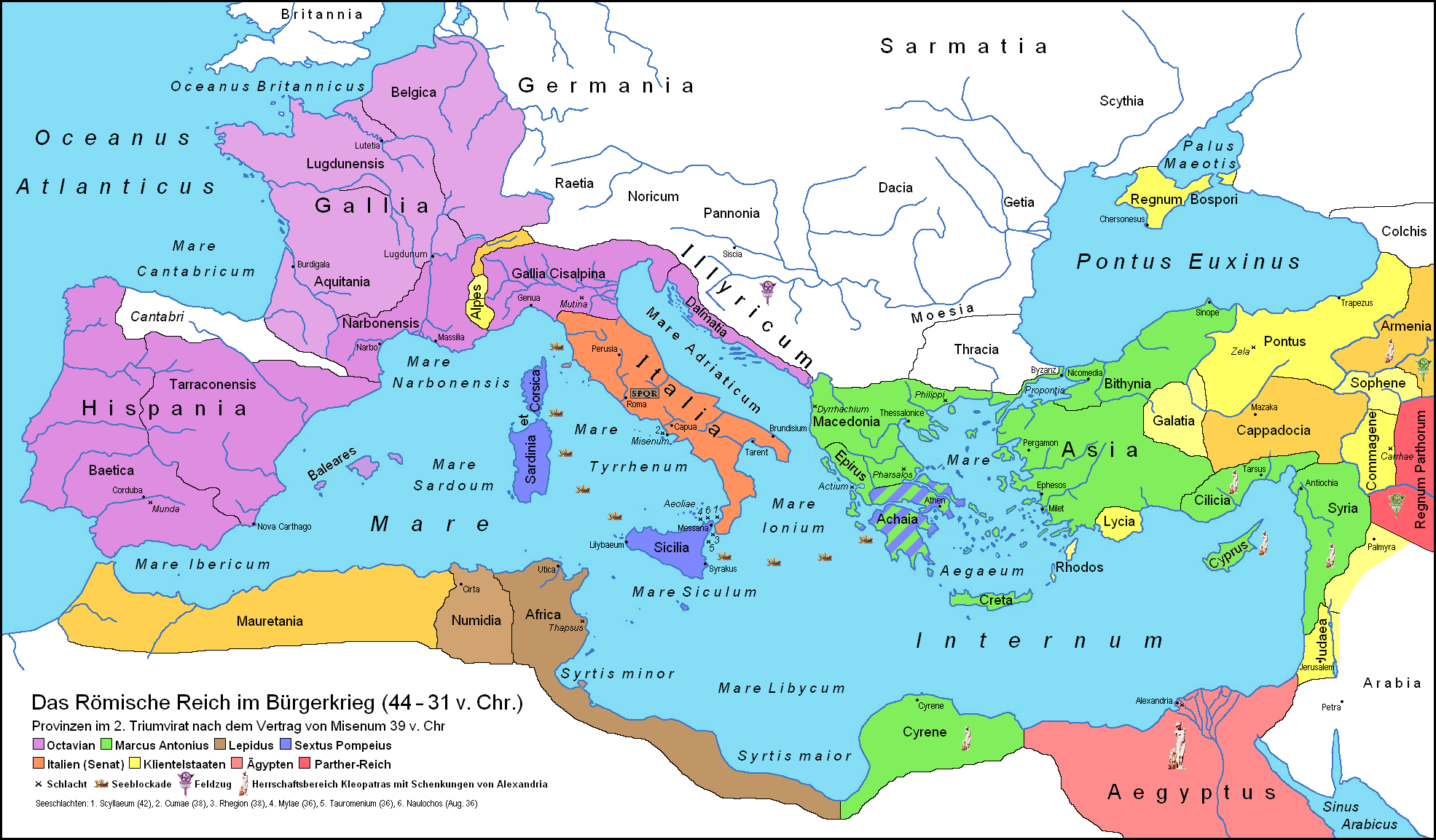
The Roman Republic during the Second Triumvirate, 44–31 BCE: Mark Antony Lepidus / Octavian Triumvirs collectively

41–31 BCE

- The Second Triumvirate gives effective control of the western part of the Roman Republic to Octavian, and the eastern part to Mark Antony. Mark Antony arrives to the eastern domains in 41 BCE and hears petitions from both Judean Jews and diaspora Jews while there, and responds favorably to Jewish entreaties. Antony also favors Herod and Phasael, giving them more power and responsibility as client rulers, and executing other Jews who oppose them.

40 BCE

- Pompeian–Parthian invasion of 40 BCE: The Parthian Empire conquers much of Roman Syria and Palestine. Hyrcanus II is mutilated by Antigonus II and taken prisoner, Phasael commits suicide, Jerusalem is conquered, and Herod flees into exile.
- Herod, in exile in Rome, is declared king by the Roman Senate.

40–37 BCE

- Reign of Antigonus II Mattathias as puppet king of the Parthians. His reign is consumed by a losing war against a Roman army commanded by Mark Antony and an army raised by Herod backing his own claim.

Summer 37 BCE

- Jerusalem is retaken and Antigonus II is executed. Herod, given the kingship of Judea earlier by the Roman Senate, now takes control.

== Herodian kingdom (37 BCE – 4 BCE) ==
Map of the Herodian Kingdom of Judea at its greatest extent

37–4 BCE

- Reign of Herod the Great as king.

31–30 BCE

- Battle of Actium: Octavian defeats the alliance of Mark Antony and Queen Cleopatra's Ptolemaic Egypt in the War of Actium, a Roman civil war. Ptolemaic Egypt is absorbed into Octavian's Roman Empire to become Roman Egypt.
- Herod, an ally of Mark Antony, pledges his loyalty to Octavian and continues in his kingship of Judea.
- Hyrcanus II, who had been allowed to live by Herod previously, is executed by Herod, presumably as a threat to his leadership.

31 BCE – 14 CE

- Reign of Augustus Caesar, formerly known as Octavian, as Roman Emperor.
- The Wisdom of Solomon is written, probably in Alexandria in Roman Egypt.
- The Houses of Hillel and Shammai are active in their writing. Hillel the Elder and Menahem, with Menahem later replaced by Shammai, are considered the last of the Zugot ("pairs").

30–4 BCE

- Various territories that had been taken away from Judea in earlier conflicts are restored to an expanding Herodian kingdom, as a sign of Roman trust in Herod's leadership.

29 BCE

- Herod grudgingly orders the execution of his Hasmonean wife Mariamne I, perhaps due to her bitterness at the death of her other family members and belief in accusations that Herod had murdered Aristobulus III, another Hasmonean descendent.

10 BCE

- Herod gains influence over Batanaea to the east. As exilic Jews in Babylonia traveled through the area when coming to Judea for trade or pilgrimage, he establishes a Jewish settlement there to protect traders from brigands.

c. 8–7 BCE

- Herod orders the execution of his two sons from his marriage to Mariamne, Alexander and Aristobulus. This was allegedly due to some combination of paranoia about his sons having greater popularity than him, and machinations from his son by another wife Antipater.

c. 6–4 BCE

- Usual dating of the birth of Jesus of Nazareth.

4 BCE

- Death of Herod the Great. His kingdom is divided into the Herodian Tetrarchy between four members of his family: his sons Herod Archelaus, Herod Antipas, and Philip; as well as his sister Salome I.

== Roman Judea and the Herodian tetrarchy (4 BCE – 70 CE) ==
The Herodian Tetrarchy: Territory under Herod Archelaus Territory under Herod Antipas Territory under Philip Territory under Salome I Syria Province

4 BCE – 30 CE

- Assumption of Moses either is written or reaches its final form (if based on earlier writings).

6 CE

- Herod Archelaus is deposed as ethnarch by Emperor Augustus, and exiled to Vienna in Gaul. His territory becomes the province of Roman Judea: Judea, Samaria, and Idumea.
- Census of Quirinius: Romans take a census of the new province of Roman Judea, an act unpopular with local Jews. A Jewish resistance and possibly even revolt arises, although almost nothing is known of it other than that it was led by Judas of Galilee and Saddok the Pharisee. The conflict helps inspire a radical anti-Roman movement among Jews, the Zealots.

c. 10

- Death of Salome I at some point during the term of Marcus Ambivulus (9–12); her territory around Jamnia is incorporated into the Roman province of Judea.

Map of the Roman province of Judea

14–37

- Reign of Roman Emperor Tiberius.

19

- Emperor Tiberius expels some Jews from Rome, although accounts differ as to what precisely happened, who was affected, and how significant it was.

20

- Antipas builds the city of Tiberias and makes it the new capital of his territory, replacing Sepphoris.

20–54

- The book 4 Maccabees is estimated to have been written, although other scholars suggest an even later date.

26–36

- Term of Pontius Pilate as procurator of Judea.

c. 28–30

- Preaching and ministry of Jesus of Nazareth.

c. 30–33

- Trial and crucifixion of Jesus by Pilate.
- Jesus's followers form Jewish Christianity, initially a sect of Judaism.

c. 30–56

- The rulers Helena of Adiabene, her son Izates, and some number of their subjects convert to Judaism in Adiabene, a Parthian client kingdom. Helena makes a pilgrimage to Jerusalem around 46 or 47 and seems to stay for some time.

34

- Death of the tetrarch Philip. His territory is at first given to the Syrian legate, and soon after to Agrippa I.

c. 35–37

- Term of Vitellius as governor of Syria. Jews complain to him, and he takes several steps popular among Jews: He grants the Jews custody over the High Priest's vestments, dismisses Pilate and sends him back to Rome, and remits certain taxes on Jerusalem.

c. 35–36

- War between Herod Antipas and Aretas IV of Nabatea goes badly for Antipas, and his army is destroyed.

37–41

- Reign of Roman Emperor Caligula.

37

- Caligula grants Agrippa I the title of king and the tetrarchy of Philip and Lysanius.

38

- Herod Antipas makes an attempt to be given the rank of king himself, fails, and is exiled. His territory in Galilee is given to his rival, Agrippa I.
- Alexandrian riots: Civic disorder breaks out between Jews and Greeks in Alexandria, Egypt.

c. 40–41

- An order comes from Caligula that a statue of himself be placed in the Second Temple. The governor of Syria, Petronius, stalls, and Agrippa I intervenes; the plan is quashed.

41

- Emperor Caligula is assassinated. Agrippa aids in Claudius's elevation to the throne; Claudius rewards him by expanding his kingdom to include Judea and Samaria.
- After further riots in Alexandria between Jews and Greeks, Claudius issues an edict affirming the right of Jews to keep their religion, and directing both parties to maintain the peace. The edict is soon expanded to the Roman world at large, affirming Jewish privileges to maintain their own separate worship.

41–54

- Reign of Emperor Claudius.
- At some point in Claudius's reign, an expulsion of Jews from Rome occurs, or possibly an expulsion of Jewish Christians. Details are highly uncertain. As Claudius supported the Jews in other aspects, it is generally thought that this edict was limited in scope and sought the preservation of civic peace, rather than anti-Jewish sentiment.

c. 41–70

- Megillat Taanit, the "Scroll of Fasting", is probably written, a list of Jewish feast days.

44

- Death of Agrippa I. Judea reverts to being a Roman province under direct rule, with Fadus dispatched as governor.

46–48

- Jacob and Simon uprising: An anti-Roman insurgency breaks out in the Galilee, said to be led by two sons of Judas of Galilee. It is suppressed by Governor Tiberius Alexander.

c. 47–64

- Travels of Paul of Tarsus across the Eastern Mediterranean region. He preaches his form of early Christianity, especially to diaspora Jewish communities, and clashes with other diaspora Jewish leaders. One of the beginnings of the eventual split of early Christianity and Judaism; Paul's theology later becomes Pauline Christianity.

48–53

- Agrippa II, Agrippa's son, is appointed ruler of Chalcis in Iturea after its previous ruler's death. He is also given responsibility over the Temple and the High Priesthood in Jerusalem.

52–59

- Term of Antonius Felix as procurator of Judea. His rule is widely condemned in ancient sources, both non-Jewish and Jewish, for its corruption.

53–66

- Agrippa II is given the territory of the former tetrarchy of his great-uncle Philip to rule, in exchange for giving up Chalcis.

54–68

- Reign of Emperor Nero.

64–66

- Gessius Florus's term as procurator of Judea. The historian Josephus blames him for deliberately provoking a revolt to cover up his corruption and crimes; while likely exaggerated, Florus does appear to have enriched himself using his office, leading to Jewish anger.

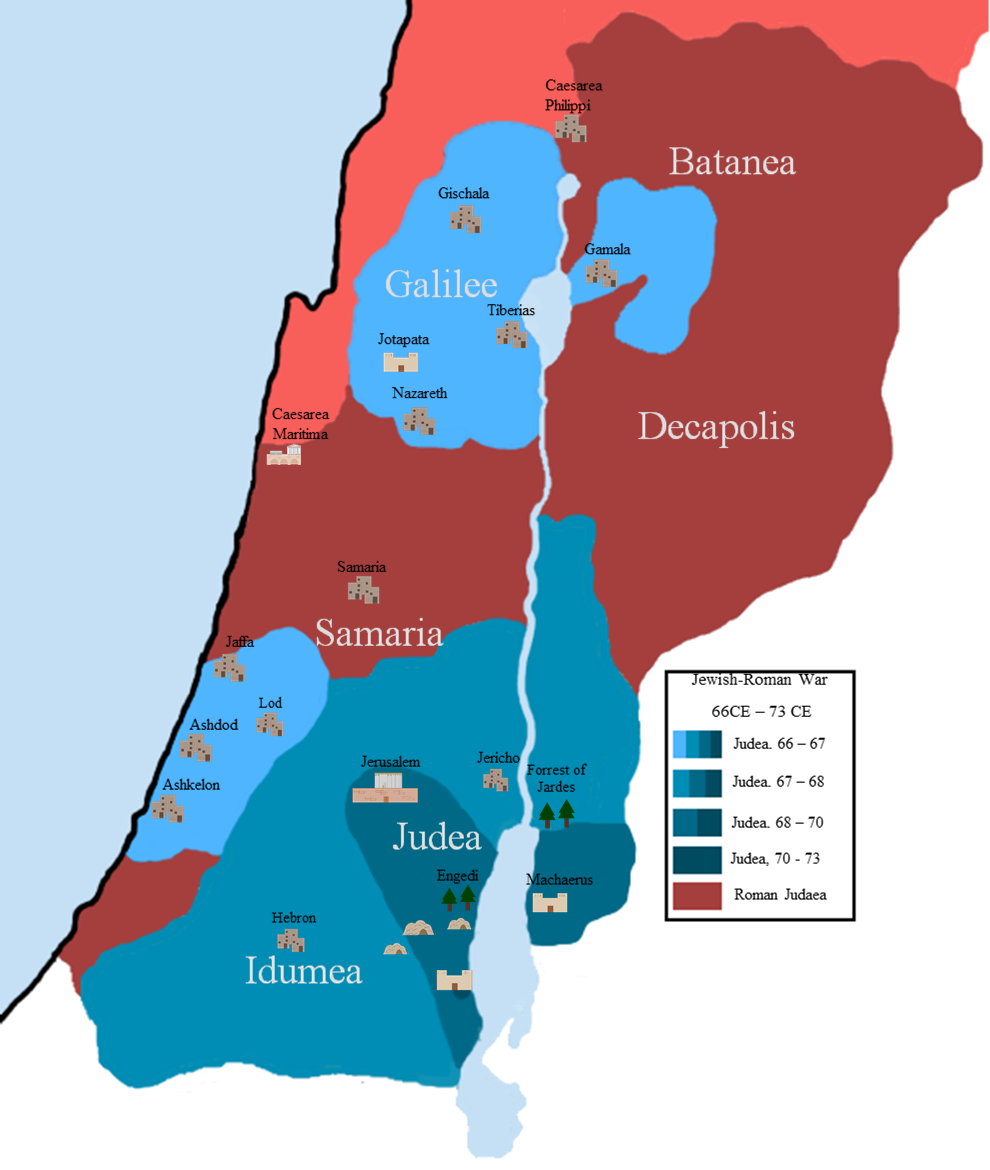
Map of territory held by the Judean provisional government (66–68), the feuding rebel remnants under Simon bar Giora and John of Giscala (68–70), and the last holdouts (70–73)

66–73

- First Jewish–Roman War: Jews rebel against Roman rule.

66

- King Agrippa II unsuccessfully appeals for peace; he is expelled from Jerusalem. He appeals to Emperor Nero for aid. Jerusalem is split between a peace party and a war party.
- The radical Sicarii capture the fortress of Masada and execute the Roman garrison. Around July or August, they capture Antonia Fortress, execute the garrison, and set the fort ablaze. The pro-war party takes control of Jerusalem.
- In the wider Eastern Mediterranean region, a cycle of violence begins, as nervous non-Jews and Jews instigate massacres of the other, fearful of the consequences of the other side gaining control.
- Cestius Gallus, governor of Syria, campaigns against the rebellion. He besieges Jerusalem in October, but breaks off the siege and withdraws.
- Battle of Beth Horon: Cestius Gallus's retreating troops are defeated by the Jews.
- The Jewish faction based in Jerusalem forms a Judean provisional government combining both moderates and pro-war parties.

November 66–May 67

- Jewish rebels attempt to take Ascalon, but are defeated by Roman cavalry in the field.

67

- Galilee campaign: Roman legions under General Vespasian and Titus subdue Galilee and the northern regions. One of the captured Jewish leaders after the Siege of Yodfat is Josephus, who will later become a court historian.

68

- Zealot Temple siege: The Zealots and allied Idumeans overthrow the provisional government in Jerusalem and take over leadership of the revolt.

69

- Year of the Four Emperors: Unrest and civil war in the Roman Empire as Emperor Galba is replaced by Otho, who is replaced by Vitellius. Vespasian, on campaign in Judea, is declared Emperor by his troops and supporters. His allies defeat Vitellius, making Vespasian Emperor.
- Jewish infighting strife in Jerusalem continues. Simon bar Giora enters the city in Spring 69 and contests with John of Giscala for leadership of the rebellion, with each controlling parts of Jerusalem.
- Some of the Idumeans leave Jerusalem and abandon the Zealots.

May–August 70

- Siege of Jerusalem: Four legions of Roman troops under Titus besiege the city. Infighting between Jewish factions continues, and food supplies run low or are destroyed. Much of Jerusalem is destroyed by fire. The Second Temple is destroyed. Many residents perish, with surviving Jews enslaved.

70–73

- Romans under Lucilius Bassus besiege and occupy remaining Jewish holdouts. Herodium is taken; Machaerus surrenders and its defenders leave honorably, but the local townspeople are killed or enslaved; and Jewish refugees in the forest of Jades (location uncertain) are slain. The Siege of Masada overwhelms the final pocket of Jewish resistance.
- Titus and Vespasian celebrate a triumph in Rome.
- Oniad Temple at Leontopolis in Egypt closes and is dismantled on Vespasian's orders, to prevent it from becoming a new center of Jewish worship.

== Aftermath ==
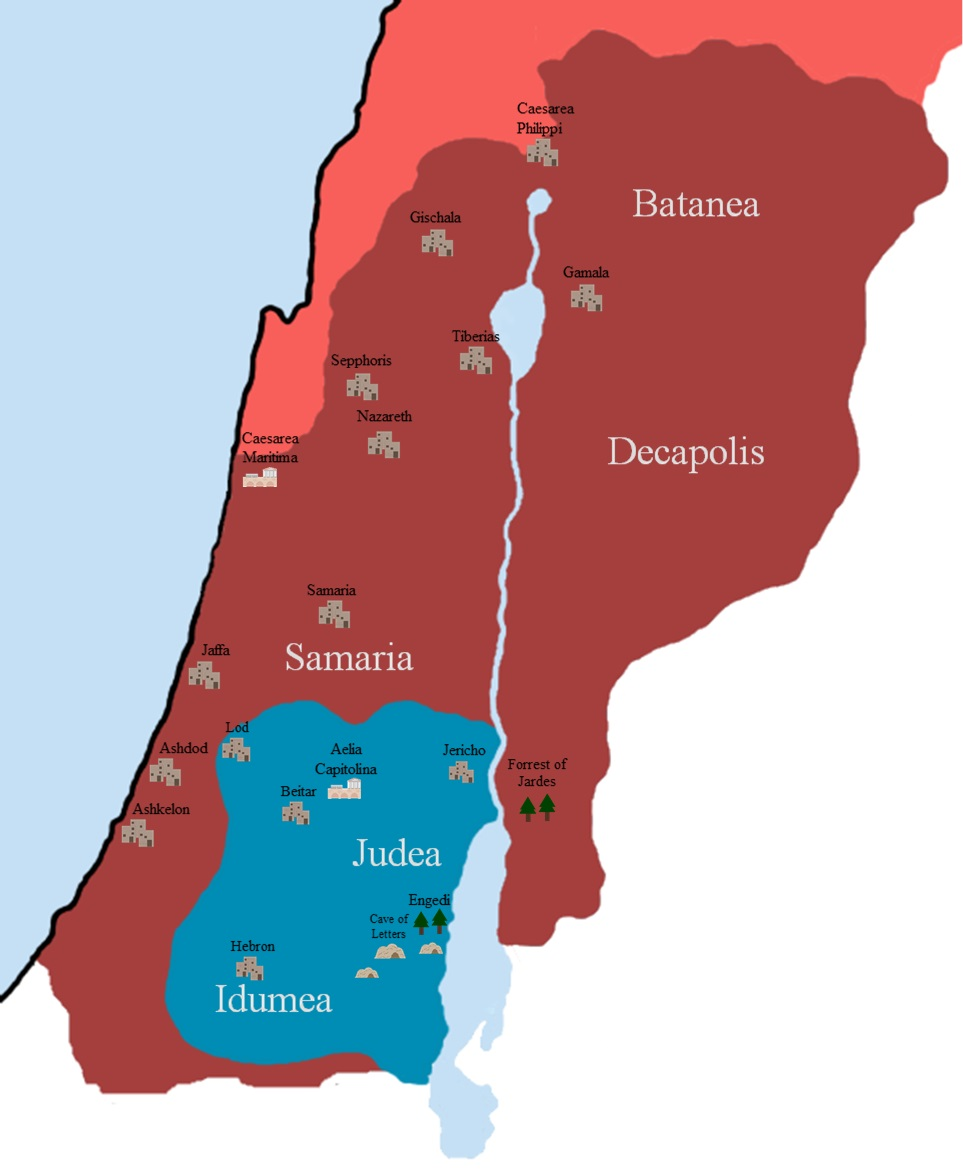
Map of territory held by rebels in the Bar Kokhba revolt (132–136), the last of the Jewish–Roman wars

70–100

- Yohanan ben Zakkai is given permission by Romans to relocate to Yavneh and founds a Jewish academy there in 70 CE. The academy's work becomes the basis for what is eventually known as rabbinic Judaism. The sages active in the 1st and 2nd century are later known as the Tannaim.
- Council of Jamnia is held in the late 1st century. While the Jewish canon was probably not finalized here, it is often considered the beginning of the standardization of the Tanakh (Hebrew Bible).

80–96

- The Arch of Titus is erected in Rome to commemorate Roman victory over the Jewish rebels; it finishes construction during the reign of Titus's brother, Emperor Domitian. It becomes an enduring symbol of the Jewish defeat.

115–117

- Jewish revolts against Trajan (also known as the Kitos War or Diaspora Revolt): Jewish rebellions erupt in Cyrenaica, Cyprus, Egypt, and Mesopotamia during the reign of Emperor Trajan. They are suppressed, seemingly with extreme loss of life.

c. 130

- Emperor Hadrian orders the construction of a new Roman colony called Aelia Capitolina, to be built on the ruins of Jerusalem. A temple dedicated to Jupiter is to replace the Second Temple.

132–136

- Bar Kokhba revolt: Jews in Judea again rise in revolt, this time under the leadership of Simon bar Kokhba. The revolt is defeated, and Jews are banned from living in Jerusalem.

== See also ==
- Timeline of Jewish history
- History of ancient Israel and Judah (1550–586 BCE)
- Second Temple Judaism

== Bibliography ==
- Bar-Kochva, Bezalel (1989). Judas Maccabaeus: The Jewish Struggle Against the Seleucids. Cambridge University Press. ISBN 0-521-32352-5.
- Bickerman, Elias (1979) [1937]. The God of the Maccabees: Studies on the Meaning and Origin of the Maccabean Revolt. Translated by Moehring, Horst R. Leiden: E. J. Brill. ISBN 90-04-05947-4.
- Friedner, Yekutiel (1982). History of the Jewish People: The Second Temple Era. Translated by Ebner, Eliezer. English version adapted and revised by Hersh Goldwurm. Mesorah Publications. ISBN 0-89906-454-X.
- Grabbe, Lester L. (2004). A History of the Jews and Judaism in the Second Temple Period: Yehud: A History of the Persian Province of Judah. Library of Second Temple Studies 47. Vol. 1. T&T Clark. ISBN 0-5670-8998-3.
- Grabbe, Lester L. (2008). A History of the Jews and Judaism in the Second Temple Period: The Coming of the Greeks: The Early Hellenistic Period (335–175 BCE). Library of Second Temple Studies 68. Vol. 2. T&T Clark. ISBN 978-0-567-03396-3.
- Grabbe, Lester L. (2020). A History of the Jews and Judaism in the Second Temple Period: The Maccabean Revolt, Hasmonaean Rule, and Herod the Great (174–4 BCE). Library of Second Temple Studies 95. Vol. 3. T&T Clark. ISBN 978-0-5676-9294-8.
- Grabbe, Lester L. (2021). A History of the Jews and Judaism in the Second Temple Period: The Jews Under the Roman Shadow (4 BCE–150 CE). Library of Second Temple Studies 99. Vol. 4. T&T Clark. ISBN 978-0-5677-0070-4.
- Grainger, John D. (2010). The Syrian Wars. Mnemosyne Supplements 320. Brill. ISBN 978-90-04-18050-5.
- Grainger, John D. (2012). The Wars of the Maccabees. Pen & Sword Books. ISBN 978-1-78159-946-4.
- Mendels, Doron (1987). The Land of Israel as a Political Concept in Hasmonean Literature. Tübingen: J.C.B. Mohr. ISBN 3-16-145147-3.
- Sacchi, Paolo (2004) [2000]. The History of the Second Temple Period. Journal for the Study of the Old Testament Supplement Series 285. T&T Clark. ISBN 0-567-04450-5.
- Schwartz, Daniel R. (2008). 2 Maccabees. Commentaries on Early Jewish Literature. Berlin: Walter De Gruyter. ISBN 978-3-11-019118-9.
- Schwartz, Daniel R. (2022). 1 Maccabees: A New Translation with Introduction and Commentary. The Anchor Yale Bible. Vol. 41B. New Haven & London: Yale University Press. doi:10.2307/j.ctv2t5xh30. ISBN 978-0-300-15993-6.
