= Herodian kingdom =

Client state of the Roman Republic from 37 to 4 BCE

Coordinates: 31°46′34″N 35°13′41″E

Kingdom of the Jews Regnum Iudaeorum ממלכת היהודים
- 37 BC–4 BC
- Herodian kingdom of Judea at its greatest extent
- Status: Client state of the Roman Republic / Roman Empire
- Capital: Jerusalem
- Common languages: Koine Greek, Aramaic, Latin, Hebrew, Phoenician, Old Arabic
- Religion: Second Temple Judaism; Samaritanism; Paganism; Ancient Semitic religion Canaanite religion North Arabian polytheism Hellenistic religion Roman imperial cult
- Government: Monarchy
- King of the Jews
  - 37 BCE – 4 BCE: Herod the Great
- Historical era: Roman Palestine
  - conquest of Hasmonean kingdom: 37 BC
  - formation of Tetrarchy: 4 BC
- Currency: Herodian coinage
Preceded by	Succeeded by
Hasmonean kingdom	Herodian tetrarchy
- Today part of: Israel; Palestine; Jordan; Syria

The Herodian kingdom of Judea was a client state of the Roman Republic, later Roman Empire, ruled from 37 to 4 BCE by Herod the Great, who was appointed "King of the Jews" by the Roman Senate. When Herod died, the kingdom was divided among his sons into the Herodian tetrarchy.

The Herodian kingdom included the regions of Judea, Idumea, Samaria, and Galilee, as well as several regions east of the Jordan River—Perea, Batanaea, Auranitis, and Trachonitis.

== Background ==
=== Roman involvement in the Levant ===
The first intervention of Rome in the region dates from 63 BCE, following the end of the Third Mithridatic War, when Rome created the province of Syria. After the defeat of Mithridates VI of Pontus, Pompey the Great sacked Jerusalem in 63 BCE. The Hasmonean Queen, Salome Alexandra, had recently died and her sons, Hyrcanus II and Aristobulus II, turned against each other in a civil war. In 63 BCE, Aristobulus was besieged in Jerusalem by his brother's armies. He sent an envoy to Marcus Aemilius Scaurus, Pompey's representative in the area. Aristobulus offered a massive bribe to be rescued, which Pompey promptly accepted. Afterwards, Aristobulus accused Scaurus of extortion. Since Scaurus was Pompey's brother-in-law and protégé, the general retaliated by putting Hyrcanus in charge of the kingdom as Prince and High Priest.

When Pompey was defeated by Julius Caesar, Hyrcanus was succeeded by his courtier Antipater the Idumaean, also known as Antipas, as the first Roman Procurator. In 57–55 BCE, Aulus Gabinius, proconsul of Syria, split the former Hasmonean kingdom into five districts of Sanhedrin/Synedrion (councils of law).

=== Parthian invasion and Roman intervention ===
After Julius Caesar was murdered in 44 BCE, Quintus Labienus, a Roman republican general and ambassador to the Parthians, sided with Brutus and Cassius in the Liberators' civil war; after their defeat Labienus joined the Parthians and assisted them in invading Roman territories in 40 BCE. The Parthian army crossed the Euphrates and Labienus was able to entice Mark Antony's Roman garrisons around Syria to rally to his cause. The Parthians split their army, and under Pacorus conquered the Levant from the Phoenician coast through the Land of Israel:

"Antigonus... roused the Parthians to invade Syria and Palestine, [and] the Jews eagerly rose in support of the scion of the Maccabean house, and drove out the hated Idumeans with their puppet Jewish king. The struggle between the people and the Romans had begun in earnest, and though Antigonus, when placed on the throne by the Parthians, proceeded to spoil and harry the Jews, rejoicing at the restoration of the Hasmonean line, thought a new era of independence had come.

When Phasael and Hyrcanus II set out on an embassy to the Parthians, the Parthians instead captured them. Antigonus, who was present, cut off Hyrcanus's ears to make him unsuitable for the High Priesthood, while Phasael was put to death.

Antigonus, whose Hebrew name was Mattathias, bore the double title of king and High Priest for only three years. He had not disposed of Herod, who fled into exile and sought the support of Mark Antony. Herod was designated "King of the Jews" by the Roman Senate in 40 BCE: Antony "then resolved to get [Herod] made king of the Jews...[and] told [the Senate] that it was for their advantage in the Parthian war that Herod should be king; so they all gave their votes for it. And when the senate was separated, Antony and Caesar [Augustus] went out, with Herod between them; while the consul and the rest of the magistrates went before them, in order to offer sacrifices [to the Roman gods], and to lay the decree in the Capitol. Antony also made a feast for Herod on the first day of his reign."

The struggle thereafter lasted for some years, as the main Roman forces were occupied with defeating the Parthians and had few additional resources to use to support Herod. After the Parthian defeat, Herod was victorious over his rival in 37 BCE. Antigonus was delivered to Antony and executed shortly thereafter, bringing about the end of the Hasmonean rule over Israel.

== Herod as king ==
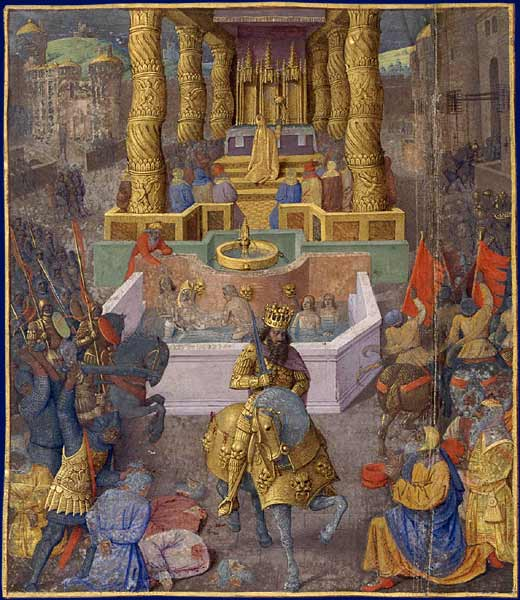
The taking of Jerusalem by Herod the Great, 37 BCE, by Jean Fouquet, late 15th century

King Herod has become known among the archaeologists as Herod the Builder, and under his reign Judea experienced an unprecedented construction, still obtaining an impact on the landscape of the region. Under his enterprise, such projects as the Masada fortress, the Herodion and the great port of Caesarea Maritima were built.

=== Fate of the Hasmonean dynasty under Herod ===
Antigonus was not, however, the last male Hasmonean; Aristobulus III, grandson of Aristobulus II through his elder son Alexander, and brother of the Hasmonean princess Mariamne, was briefly made high priest, but was soon executed (36 BCE) due to jealousy of Herod's first wife Doris. His sister, Mariamne was married to Herod, but fell victim to his notorious fear of being assassinated. Her sons by Herod, Aristobulus IV and Alexander, were in their adulthood also executed by their father, but not before Aristobulus IV having sired Herodias.

Hyrcanus II had been held by the Parthians since 40 BCE. For four years, until 36 BCE, he lived amid the Babylonian Jews, who paid him every mark of respect. In that year Herod, who feared that Hyrcanus might induce the Parthians to help him regain the throne, invited him to return to Jerusalem. The Babylonian Jews warned him in vain. Herod received him with every mark of respect, assigning him the first place at his table and the presidency of the state council, while awaiting an opportunity to get rid of him. As the last remaining Hasmonean, Hyrcanus was too dangerous a rival for Herod. In the year 30 BCE, charged with plotting with the King of Arabia, Hyrcanus was condemned and executed.

During King Herod's reign, the last male representatives of the Hasmoneans were eliminated, while only Herodias remained alive with her daughter Salome. Herodias was among the few remaining Hasmonean female heirs, as she was granddaughter of Alexander. Herodias was granddaughter of the Hasmonean princess Mariamne. Mariamne was ultimately convicted on dubious charges that arose from palace intrigue and internal power struggles. She was executed in 29 BCE, but was survived by her granddaughter Herodias and her great-granddaughter Salome. Herodias managed to survive. When her husband Herod Antipas was accused by his nephew Agrippa I of conspiracy against the new Roman emperor Caligula, she and Herod were exiled to Gaul.

The later Herodian rulers Agrippa I and his son Agrippa II both had Hasmonean blood, as Agrippa I's father was Aristobulus IV, son of Herod by Mariamne I, but they were not male descendants, and thus not seen legitimate rulers by much of the Jewish population.

== Dissolution: formation of the Tetrarchies ==
Herod died in 4 BCE, and his kingdom was divided among his three sons, none of them inherited his title of king (basileus). Herod Archelaus assumed the title of ethnarch and ruled Judea, Samaria and Idumea so badly that he was dismissed in 6 CE by the Roman emperor Augustus, who appointed Quirinius to exercise direct Roman rule after an appeal from Herod Archelaus' own population, thus was formed the Province of Judea. Another, Herod Antipas, ruled as tetrarch of Galilee and Perea from 4 BCE to 39 CE, being then dismissed by Caligula, and Philip ruled as tetrarch of Iturea, Trachonitis, Batanea, Gaulanitis, Auranitis and Paneas from 4 BCE to his death in 34 CE.

== See also ==
- Roman Palestine
- Herodian dynasty
- List of biblical figures identified in extra-biblical sources
- Temple in Jerusalem
- Timeline of the Second Temple period
