= Mariamne =

Feminine given name

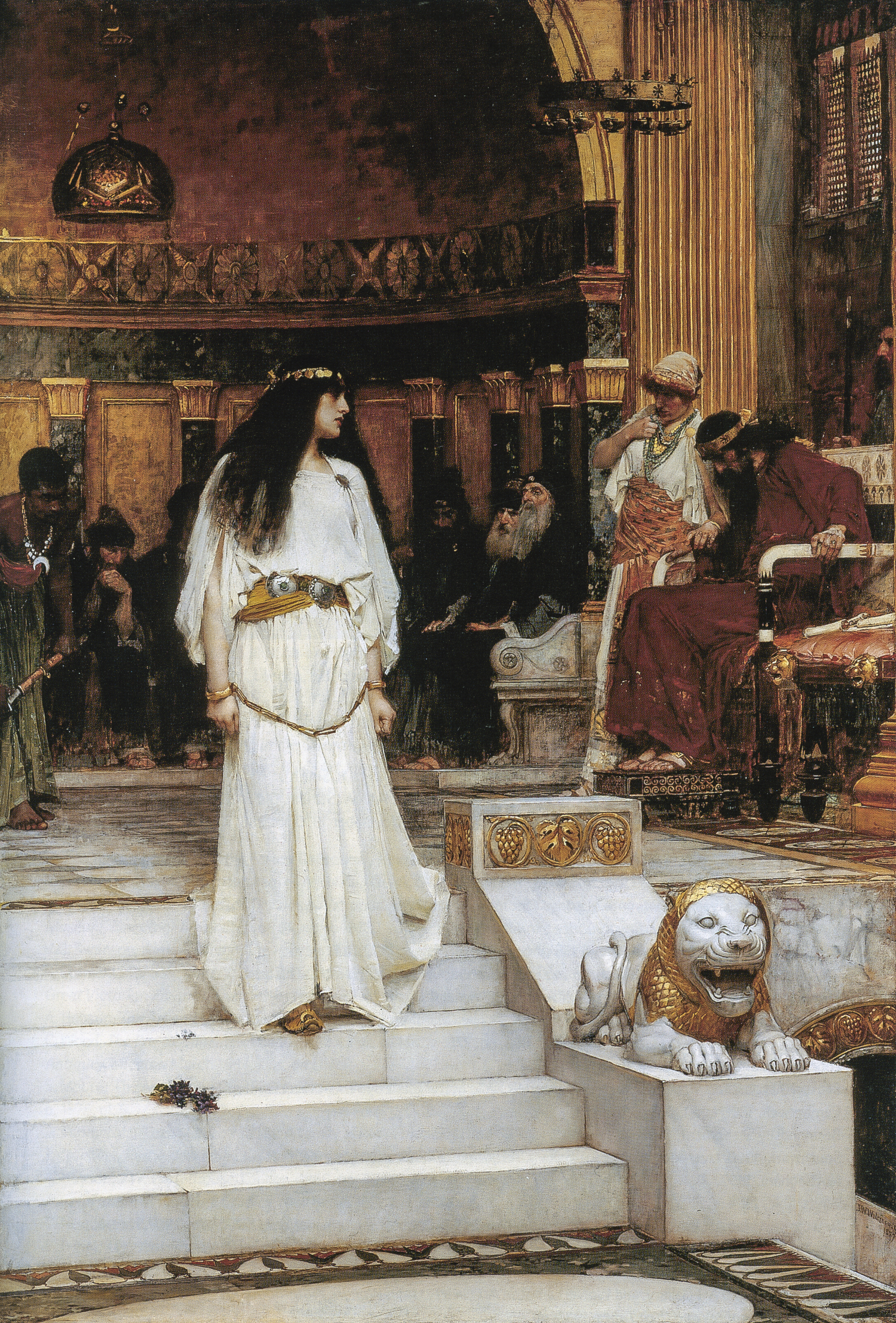
- Mariamne Leaving the Judgement Seat of Herod by John William Waterhouse, 1887
- Gender: Female
- Language: Hebrew

Origin
- Meaning: Bitter

Mariamne is a name frequently used in the Herodian royal house. In Greek it is spelled Μαριάμη (Mariame) by Josephus; in some editions of his work the second m is doubled (Mariamme). In later copies of those editions the spelling was dissimilated to its now most common form, Mariamne. In Hebrew, Mariamne is known as מִרְיָם, (Miriam), as in the Biblical name (see Miriam, the sister of Moses and Aaron); Mariamne is the Hellenized version of the Hebrew, as Koine Greek was a common language in the late Hasmonean era in Judea (together with Aramaic), where both Mariamnes lived.

For Gnostic readers Mariamne is also recognized as possibly being Mary Magdalene. François Bovon, professor of the history of religion at Harvard University, has theorized based on his study of the Acts of Philip (which describes the apostle Philip as the brother of "Mariamne" or "Mariamme") that Mariamene, or Mariamne, was the actual name of Mary Magdalene. Mary/Mariam was a common name in 1st century Israel, however, not all Marys or Mariams would go by the name Mariamne. Nicknames were often used to distinguish between those with common names (Mary, Joseph, etc.).

Holders include:

- Mariamne (second wife of Herod) (d. 29 BCE), a.k.a. Mariamne I
- Mariamne (third wife of Herod) (fl. 4 BCE), a.k.a. Mariamne II
- Mariamne III (fl. 7 BCE), sister of Herodias
- Mariamne (1st century) (fl. early 1st century CE), wife of Herod of Chalcis
- Mariamne (daughter of Herod Agrippa) (born 34 or 35), a daughter of Herod Agrippa.
- Mariamne the sister of the Apostle Philip
- Olivia Mariamne Devenish (1771–1814), British socialite
- Mariamne Johnes (1784-1811), daughter of Thomas Johnes, Hafod, Wales

== See also ==
- Voltaire's play Mariamne and Augustin Nadal's rival play Mariamne.
- A 1723 British play Mariamne by Elijah Fenton.
- The Secret Magdalene by Ki Longfellow
- Miriai
