= Alexandra the Maccabee =

Hasmonean matriarch (d. c. 28 BC)

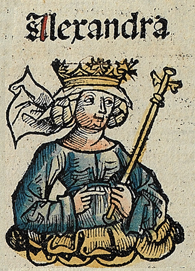
- Alexandra the Maccabee from Nuremberg Chronicle, published in 1493
- Died: ca. 28 BC
- Spouse: Alexander of Judaea
- Issue: Mariamne I Aristobulus III of Judea
- House: Hasmonean
- Father: Hyrcanus II

Alexandra the Maccabee (died ca. 28 BC), part of the Hasmonean dynasty, was an influential politician in Judea. She is most famous for her intense political manoeuvrings and attempted coup against her son-in-law, Herod the Great.

She was the daughter of Hyrcanus II (died 30 BC), and granddaughter of Alexander Jannaeus. She married her cousin Alexander of Judaea (died 48 BC), who was the son of Aristobulus II. Their grandfather was Alexander Jannaeus, the second eldest son of John Hyrcanus. Their daughter was the Hasmonean Mariamne and son was Aristobulus III.

Alexandra opposed her son-in-law Herod, and when he became sick with grief after having Mariamne executed, Alexandra tried to seize power, but was unsuccessful and was herself executed.
