= Antigonus II Mattathias =

King of Judea from 40 to 37 BC

- King and High Priest of Judaea
- Antigonus, from Guillaume Rouillé's Promptuarii Iconum Insigniorum

King of Judaea
- Reign: 40 – 37 BCE
- Predecessor: Aristobulus II
- Successor: Monarchy abolished

High Priest of Judaea
- Reign: 40 – 37 BCE
- Predecessor: Hyrcanus II
- Successor: Ananelus
- Died: 37 BC
- Issue: A daughter
- Dynasty: Hasmonean
- Father: Aristobulus II
- Religion: Judaism

Antigonus II Mattathias (Ancient Greek: Ἀντίγονος Antígonos; Biblical Hebrew: מַתִּתְיָהוּ Mattiṯyāhū), also known as Antigonus the Hasmonean (died 37 BCE) was High Priest of Israel, and also the last Hasmonean king of Judea. He was the son of King Aristobulus II. In 37 BCE, Herod the Great handed him over to the Romans for execution, after Antigonus's three-year reign, during which he led the Jews' fierce struggle for independence against the Romans.

== Rome ==
Antigonus was the second son of Aristobulus II. He and his father were taken to Rome as prisoners by Pompey in 63 BCE. Antigonus escaped and returned to Judea in 57 BCE. After an unsuccessful attempt to oppose the Roman forces there, and despite his refusal to surrender his dynastic rights, the senate released him. After the death of his older brother Alexander, Antigonus claimed that his uncle Hyrcanus II was a puppet of Antipater the Idumaean and attempted to overthrow him with the help and consent of the Romans. He visited Julius Caesar in 47 BCE, complaining of the usurpation of Antipater and Hyrcanus II. In 42 BCE, he attempted to seize the government of Judea by force with the assistance of his brother-in-law, Ptolemy, but was defeated by Herod.

== King with Parthian support ==
The excessive taxation wrung from the people to pay for the extravagances of Mark Antony and Cleopatra had inspired a deep hatred against Rome. Antigonus gained the allegiance of both the aristocratic class in Jerusalem and the leaders of the Pharisees. The Parthians, who invaded Syria in 40 BCE, preferred to see an anti-Roman ruler on the throne of Judea. When Antigonus promised them large sums of gold as well as five hundred female slaves, the Parthians put five hundred warriors at his disposal. After Antigonus, with Parthian help, conquered Jerusalem, Hyrcanus was sent to Babylon after having his ears mutilated, which rendered him unfit for the office of High Priest of Israel. Herod fled from Jerusalem, and in 40 BCE Antigonus was officially proclaimed king and High Priest by the Parthians.

=== Territory and popular support ===
Coins of Antigonus have been found at 53 sites throughout Judea and neighbouring regions, totalling 222 coins, eighteen of these sites in or immediately around ancient Jerusalem. Archaeologist Dvir Raviv argues that this distribution suggests Antigonus's territorial reach and popular support were broader than Josephus's account indicates. In the Lod region, 23 coins have been recorded at 11 sites, the highest concentration in Judea. Raviv interprets this as evidence of strong local support for Antigonus. He cautions that isolated finds do not necessarily indicate political allegiance, since coins might also have been carried by Herodian or Roman troops or circulated through trade. Hoards, refuge caves, underground complexes and destruction layers, however, provide stronger evidence of activity by Antigonus's supporters.

The Jericho Valley, which Raviv identifies as a major concentration of Antigonus's coins, has yielded 34 examples, compared with just one early coin of Herod's "Year 3" series. If the series dates to 40 or 37 BCE, Raviv argues, this disparity suggests that the valley remained under Antigonus's control during the war and that his regional support exceeded Herod's.

The finds also provide evidence for concealment and refuge during the war between Herod and Antigonus. At the Nesher Ramla site, two underground hiding complexes containing coins of Antigonus in their inner chambers are, in Raviv's assessment, confidently attributable to this period. Some of the complexes at the site had blocking devices and concealed access to cisterns. Raviv suggests that these complexes were intended at least partly to shelter people, not only to conceal agricultural produce. At Elkana Cave in western Samaria, two Antigonus coins and a bowl fragment dated to the first century CE have been interpreted as evidence of Jewish refugees. Josephus describes ambushes and fighting between the two sides in this region, though he does not mention any specific activity in western Samaria. Possible evidence of support for Antigonus in Transjordan comes from Hesbon, where a large-denomination coin of Antigonus was found alongside other Hasmonean coins in a Late Hellenistic fortress.

=== War with Herod ===
Following the conquest of Jerusalem by the Parthians, Herod fled quickly from Masada to Rome, where he was nominated in 40 BCE as Judea's allied king and friend of the Roman people (Latin: Rex socius et amicus populi Romani) by the Senate on the recommendation of the triumvir Mark Antony. On Herod's return to Judaea from Rome in 39 BCE he opened a campaign against Antigonus.

In the spring of 38 BCE, Herod wrested control of the province of Galilee and eventually all of Judaea, except for Jerusalem. Due to the approach of winter, Herod postponed his siege of Jerusalem—where Antigonus and the remnants of his army took refuge—until spring. Herod and a supporting Roman army were kept out of Jerusalem for 3–5 months but the Romans eventually captured the city. The supporters of Antigonus fought until the Romans reached the inner courtyard of the Temple.

== Death ==
Following the conquest of Jerusalem, Antigonus was taken to Antioch and executed, ending Hasmonean rule.

Josephus states that Mark Antony beheaded Antigonus (Antiquities, XV 1:2 (8–9). Roman historian Cassius Dio says that he was crucified and records in his Roman History: "These people [the Jews] Antony entrusted to a certain Herod to govern; but Antigonus he bound to a cross and scourged, a punishment no other king had suffered at the hands of the Romans, and so slew him." In his Life of Antony, Plutarch claims that Antony had Antigonus beheaded, "the first example of that punishment being inflicted on a king."

=== Disputed tomb in Jerusalem ===
In 1971, bulldozers removing earth in East Jerusalem for a construction project uncovered a tomb with an inscription that suggested that this was the tomb of King Antigonus, the last Hasmonean king. However, according to anthropologist Joe Zias, former Curator of Archaeology and Anthropology for the Israel Antiquities Authority, this theory is just little more than an urban myth, since the only beheaded skeleton found in 1971 and at the later re-examination of the previously untouched tomb, belonged to an elderly woman. In his view, no other set of remains found there could be associated with King Antigonus II and it is only due to the efforts of the owner of the building located on top of the tomb that the myth is still being promoted.

== Qumran Scrolls connection ==
Biblical scholar Gregory Doudna proposed in 2013 that Antigonus II Mattathias was the figure known as the Wicked Priest in the Qumran Scrolls. According to Doudna, Antigonus was the figure underlying the 'Wicked Priest' of the Habakkuk Commentary and the doomed ruler of the Nahum Commentary, documents found at Qumran.

== Bibliography ==
- Raviv, Dvir (2026). "Traces of Conflict: An Archaeological Perspective on the Hasmonean–Herodian Transition (63–37 BCE)". Electrum. 33: 243–270. doi:10.4467/20800909EL.26.012.23125.

Antigonus II Mattathias Hasmonean Dynasty Died: 37 BCE
Jewish titles
Preceded by Hyrcanus II	King of Judaea; 40 BC – 37 BCE	Succeeded by Monarchy abolished
Preceded by Hyrcanus II	High Priest of Judaea; 40 BCE – 37 BCE	Succeeded by Ananelus
