= Alexander of Judaea =

1st-century BC Jewish noble and rebel against Rome

- Died: c. 49 BCE
- Spouse: Alexandra Maccabeus
- Issue: Aristobulus III, Mariamne I
- House: Hasmonean
- Father: Aristobulus II

Alexander of Judaea (Gr. Ἀλέξανδρος, died c. 49 BCE), otherwise known as Alexander II or Alexander Maccabeus, was the eldest son of Aristobulus II, king of Judaea. Alexander married his cousin Alexandra Maccabeus, daughter of his uncle, Hyrcanus II. Their grandfather was Alexander Jannaeus, the second eldest son of John Hyrcanus. Mariamne, the daughter of Alexander and Alexandra, was Herod the Great's second wife and queen of the Jewish kingdom.

== Life ==
Alexander was taken prisoner, with his father, Aristobulus II, and his brother Antigonus II Mattathias, by the Roman general Pompey, after the capture of Jerusalem in 63 BCE. But they were able to escape his captors as they were being conveyed to Rome.

In 57 BCE, he appeared in Judaea, Upon arrival, he rallied support among discontented Jews and quickly amassed an army reportedly comprising 10,000 infantry and 1,500 cavalry, according to Josephus. He seized control of Jerusalem, forcing his uncle, Hyrcanus II to flee the city, and assumed command of the Temple Guard. Hyrcanus (with whom Alexander's father Aristobulus II had clashed) requested for aid from Aulus Gabinius, the Roman proconsul of Syria. Gabinus brought a large army against Alexander, and sent one of his cavalry commanders, the young Mark Antony in his first military command, with a body of troops in advance. In a decisive battle near Jerusalem, Alexander was soundly defeated, and took refuge in the fortress of Alexandrium. Through the mediation of his mother, he was permitted to depart, on the condition of surrendering all the fortresses still in his power. Alexander was sent back to Rome as a captive, while Hyrcanus II was restored to Jerusalem with the support of the Romans and retained control over the Temple Guard.

In the following year of 56 BCE, during the expedition of Gabinius into Egypt, Alexander again incited the Jews to revolt, and collected an army. Alexander initially achieved some successes, defeating Roman garrisons and gaining control of several fortresses. He massacred all the Romans who fell in his way and besieged the rest, who had taken refuge on Mount Gerizim. Gabinius first attempted to negotiate peace, sending Antipater the Idumean to persuade the rebels to surrender. After rejecting the terms of peace which were offered to him by Gabinius, he was defeated near Mount Tabor with the loss of 10,000 men. Alexander would then supposedly flee to Syria.

The spirit of his adherents, however, was not entirely crushed, for in 53 BCE, on the death of Marcus Licinius Crassus, he again collected some forces, but was compelled to come to terms by Cassius in 52 BCE.

== End of Life and Death ==
Three years later, in 49 BCE, Caesar's Civil War broke out, and Julius Caesar set Alexander's father Aristobulus II free. Sending him to Judaea to further his interests there. Aristobulus was poisoned on the journey, and Alexander, who was preparing to support him, was seized at the command of Pompey, and beheaded by Scipio at Antioch.
