= Mariamne Leaving the Judgement Seat of Herod =

1887 painting by John William Waterhouse

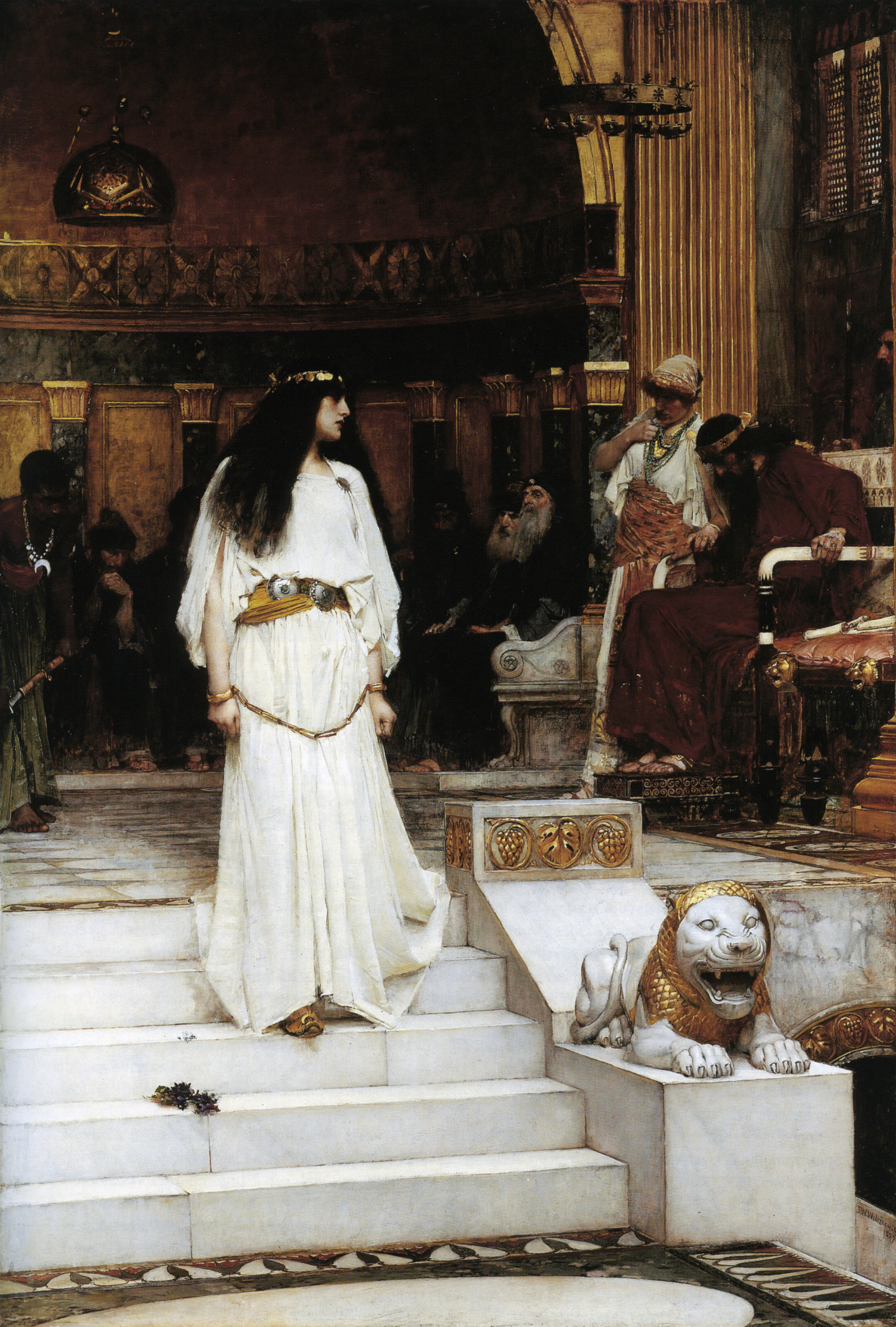
- Artist: John William Waterhouse
- Year: 1887
- Type: Oil on canvas, history painting
- Dimensions: 259 cm × 180 cm (102 in × 71 in)
- Location: Private collection

Mariamne Leaving the Judgement Seat of Herod is an 1887 history painting by the British artist John William Waterhouse. The largest painting he ever produced, it depicts a biblical scene. Mariamne, the wife of Herod the Great, King of Judea, is falsely accused of adultery by Herod's sister Salome. Waterhouse shows her in the moment the sentence has been passed on her and she is led away in chains to face execution.

The painting was displayed at the Royal Academy Exhibition of 1887 held at Burlington House in London. It enjoyed success in several other exhibitions and was awarded a gold medal International Exposition in Brussels in 1897. it was auctioned at Christie's in 2003 having previously belonged to the Forbes Collection.

== See also ==
- List of paintings by John William Waterhouse

== Bibliography ==
- Middleton, Guy D. Women in the Ancient Mediterranean World: From the Palaeolithic to the Byzantines.
- Richards, Jeffrey. The Ancient World on the Victorian and Edwardian Stage Palgrave Macmillan, 2009.
