= Hyrcanus II =

High Priest and king of Judea

- King and High Priest of Judaea; Ethnarch of Judaea
- Hyrcanus from Guillaume Rouillé's Promptuarii Iconum Insigniorum

King of Judaea
- Reign: c. 67 – 66 BCE
- Predecessor: Salome Alexandra
- Successor: Aristobulus II

High Priest of Judaea
- Reign: c. 76 – 66 BCE
- Predecessor: Alexander Jannaeus
- Successor: Aristobulus II
- Reign: 63–40 BCE
- Predecessor: Aristobulus II
- Successor: Antigonus II Mattathias

Ethnarch of Judaea
- Reign: c. 47 – 40 BCE
- Successor: Office abolished
- Born: c. 110 BC
- Died: 30 BC (aged c. 80)
- Issue: Alexandra the Maccabee
- Dynasty: Hasmonean
- Father: Alexander Jannaeus
- Mother: Salome Alexandra
- Religion: Judaism

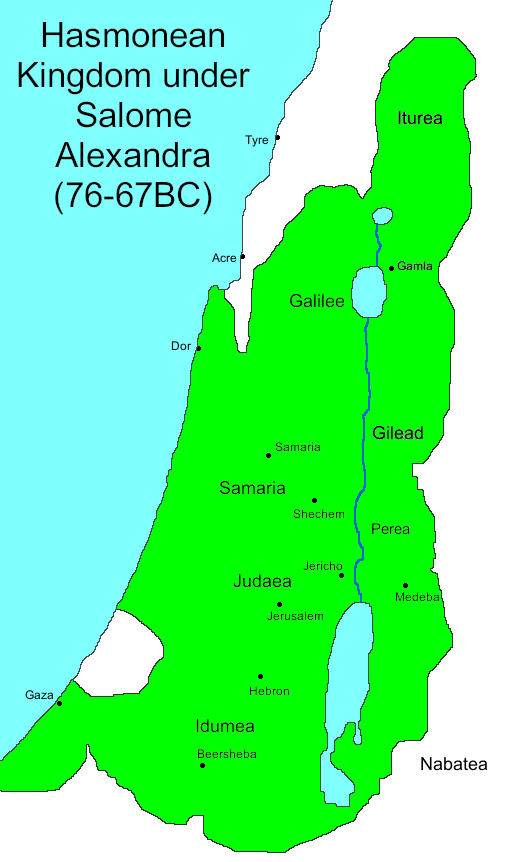
Hasmonean Kingdom to 63 BCE

John Hyrcanus II (/hərˈkeɪnəs/, Hebrew: יוחנן הרקנוס Yohanan Hurqanos; died 30 BCE), a member of the Hasmonean dynasty, was the High Priest of Israel in the 1st century BCE. He was also briefly king of Judea (67–66 BCE) and then the ethnarch of Judea, probably over the period 47–40 BCE.

== Accession ==
Hyrcanus was the elder of two sons born to Alexander Jannaeus, King and High Priest, and Salome Alexandra. After Alexander died in 76 BCE, his widow succeeded to the throne as queen of Judea. She installed Hyrcanus as High Priest in 73 BCE. When Salome died in 67 BCE, she named Hyrcanus as her successor as ruler of Judea as well, but soon he and his younger brother, Aristobulus II, began fighting over who had the right to the throne.

Alexander had numerous conflicts with the Pharisees. However, Hyrcanus was supported by the Pharisees, especially later in his tenure.

== Deposition ==
Hyrcanus had scarcely reigned three months when Aristobulus II rose in rebellion. Hyrcanus advanced against Aristobulus at the head of his forces. When the brothers met in battle near Jericho, many of Hyrcanus' soldiers defected, joining forces with Aristobulus, thereby giving the latter the victory. Hyrcanus took refuge in the citadel of Jerusalem; but Aristobulus' capture of the Temple compelled Hyrcanus to surrender. A peace was then concluded, according to the terms of which Hyrcanus was to renounce the throne and the office of High Priest, but was to enjoy the revenues of the latter office.

This agreement did not last for long, as Antipater the Idumaean convinced Hyrcanus that Aristobulus was planning his death and to take refuge with Aretas III, King of the Nabataeans. The Nabataeans advanced toward Jerusalem with an army of 50,000 men and besieged the city for several months during the rebellion.

== Alliance with the Nabataeans ==
This agreement did not last. Hyrcanus feared that Aristobulus was planning his death. Such fears were furthered by Hyrcanus' adviser, Antipater. According to Josephus, Antipater sought to control Judea by putting the weak Hyrcanus back onto the throne. Hyrcanus took refuge with Aretas III, King of the Nabataeans, who had been bribed by Antipater into supporting Hyrcanus' cause through the promise of returning Arabian towns taken by the Hasmoneans.

The Nabataeans advanced toward Jerusalem with an army of 50,000, took the city and besieged the Temple where Aristobulus had taken refuge for several months. During the siege, Josephus states that the adherents of Hyrcanus stoned the pious Onias (Honi ha'Me'agel, also Khoni or Choni ha-Me'agel), who had refused to pray for the demise of their opponents, and further angered the priests who were fighting along with Aristobulus by selling them cattle for the paschal sacrifice for the enormous price of one thousand drachmae and then refused to deliver the promised animals for the sacrifice.(Antiquities of the Jews Book 14, 2:2)

== Roman intervention ==
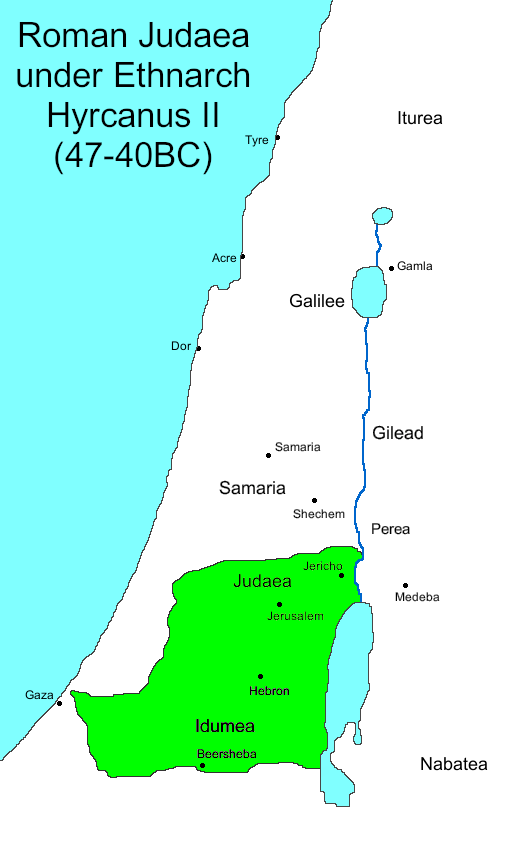
Roman Judea under Hyrcanus II

During the Roman civil war, general Pompey defeated armies of the kingdoms of Pontus and the Seleucids. He sent his deputy Marcus Aemilius Scaurus to take possession of Seleucid Syria.

As the Hasmoneans were allies of the Romans, both brothers appealed to Scaurus, each endeavouring through gifts and promises to win him over to his side. Scaurus, moved by a gift of 400 talents, decided in favour of Aristobulus and ordered Aretas to withdraw his army. During his retreat, the Nabateans suffered a crushing defeat at the hands of Aristobulus. Scaurus returned to Damascus.

When Pompey arrived in Syria in 63 BCE, both brothers and a third party that desired the removal of the entire dynasty (according to some sources, these may have been the representatives of the Pharisees), sent their delegates to Pompey, who delayed making a decision. He favoured Hyrcanus over Aristobulus, deeming the elder, weaker brother a more reliable ally of the Roman Republic.

Aristobulus, suspicious of Pompey's intentions, entrenched himself in the fortress of Alexandrium, but when the Roman army approached Judea, he surrendered and undertook to deliver Jerusalem over to them. However, since many of his followers were unwilling to open the gates, the Romans besieged and captured the city by force, badly damaging the city and the temple. Aristobulus was taken to Rome a prisoner and Hyrcanus restored as high priest in Jerusalem.

== Restoration ==
By around 63 BCE, Hyrcanus had been restored to his position as High Priest but not to the Kingship. Political authority rested with the Romans whose interests were represented by Antipater, who primarily promoted the interests of his own house. In 47 BCE, Julius Caesar restored some political authority to Hyrcanus by appointing him ethnarch. This however had little practical effect, since Hyrcanus yielded to Antipater in everything.

== Exile ==
In 40 BCE, Aristobulus' son Antigonus II Mattathias allied himself with the Parthians and was proclaimed King and High Priest. Hyrcanus was seized and his ears mutilated (according to Josephus, Antigonus bit his uncle's ears off) to make him permanently ineligible for the priesthood.

Then Hyrcanus was taken by the Parthians into captivity in Babylonia, where he lived for four years amid the Babylonian Jews, who paid him every mark of respect.

== Return to Jerusalem and death ==
In 36 BCE, Herod the Great, who had vanquished Antigonus with Roman help and feared that Hyrcanus might persuade the Parthians to help him regain the throne, invited the former High Priest to return to Jerusalem. Hyrcanus accepted and Herod received him with every mark of respect, assigning to him the first place at his table and the presidency of the state council.

However, in 30 BCE Herod charged Hyrcanus with plotting with the Nabateans and put him to death. Josephus states that Hyrcanus was 80 years old at the time of his death.

Biblical scholar Gregory Doudna proposed in 2013 that Hyrcanus II was the figure known as the Teacher of Righteousness in the Qumran Scrolls. According to Doudna, Hyrcanus II’s sectarian orientation is now generally understood to have been Sadducee.

== See also ==
- Hasmonean coinage
- Hyrcanus inscription
- Hyrcania
- Siege of Jerusalem (disambiguation), list of sieges for, and battles of, Jerusalem

== Bibliography ==
=== Sources ===
- Hammond, Martin; Goodman, Martin, eds. (2017). The Jewish War, by Josephus. Oxford: Oxford University Press. ISBN 978-0191057595.
- Flavius Josephus, Antiquities of the Jews, book XIV, 5-13.
- Flavius Josephus, The Jewish War, book I, 8-13.

=== Literature ===
- Heinrich Ewald, Geschichte des Volkes Israel, volume IV, p. 524ff.
- Heinrich Graetz, History of the Jews, volume III, p. 167ff.
- Hitzig, Geschichte des Volkes Israel, volume II, p. 500ff.
- Emil Schürer, Geschichte des judischen Volks im Zeitalter Jesu Christi, volume I, p. 338 et seq.

Hyrcanus II Hasmonean Died: 30 BCE
Jewish titles
| Preceded by Alexander Jannaeus | High Priest of Judaea; 76 BCE – 66 BCE | Succeeded by Aristobulus II |
| Preceded by Salome Alexandra | King of Judaea; 67 BCE – 66 BCE | Succeeded by Aristobulus II |
| Preceded by Aristobulus II | High Priest of Judaea; 63 BCE – 40 BCE | Succeeded by Antigonus II Mattathias |
| Preceded by Aristobulus II | Ethnarch of Judea; 47 BCE – 40 BCE | Succeeded by Antigonus II Mattathias |
