= Aristobulus II =

- King and High Priest of Judaea
- Aristobulus II, from Guillaume Rouillé's Promptuarii Iconum Insigniorum

King of Judaea
- Reign: c. 66 – 63 BCE
- Predecessor: Hyrcanus II
- Successor: Antigonus II Mattathias

High Priest of Judaea
- Reign: c. 66 – 63 BCE
- Predecessor: Hyrcanus II
- Successor: Hyrcanus II
- Died: c. 49 BCE
- Issue: Antigonus II Mattathias; Alexander of Judaea
- Dynasty: Hasmonean
- Father: Alexander Jannaeus
- Mother: Salome Alexandra
- Religion: Judaism

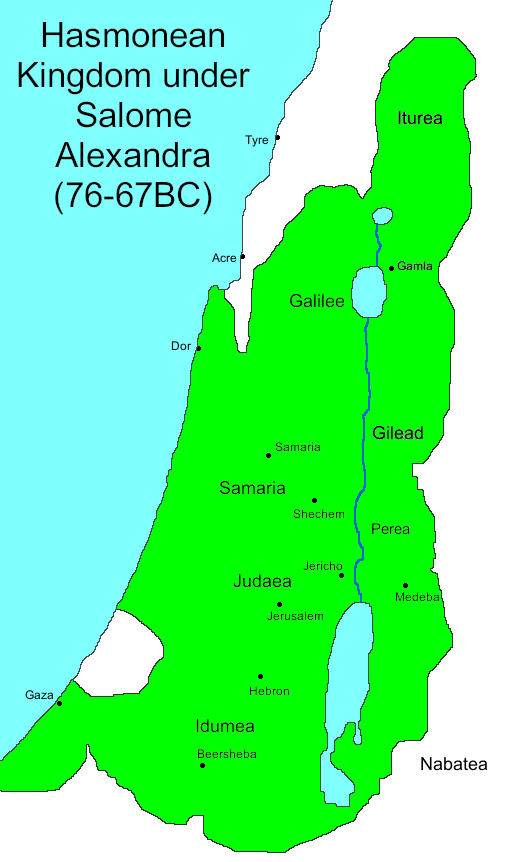
Hasmonean Kingdom under Aristobulus II

Aristobulus II (/ˌærɪstəˈbjuːləs/, Ancient Greek: Ἀριστόβουλος Aristóboulos) was High Priest of Israel and king of Judea from 66 BCE to 63 BCE, during the Hasmonean period in Jewish history.

== Family ==
Aristobulus was the younger of two sons born to Alexander Jannaeus, King and High Priest, and Salome Alexandra. After Alexander died in 76 BCE, his widow succeeded to the throne as queen of Judea. She installed her elder son Hyrcanus II as High Priest in 73 BCE. When Salome died in 67 BCE, Hyrcanus succeeded to the kingship as well.

Aristobulus shared his late father's views on religion and politics. He entertained designs upon the throne, even during his mother's reign. He courted the nobles and the military by constituting himself the patron of the Sadducees and bringing their cause before the queen. The fortresses which the queen had placed at the disposal of the Sadducees, ostensibly for their defense against the Pharisees, constituted in reality one of the preparatory moves of Aristobulus for his usurpation of the throne. The queen sought to direct his military zeal outside Judea and sent him against Ptolemy Mennaeus. After this undertaking had failed, Aristobulus resumed his political intrigues within Judea. He left Jerusalem secretly and betook himself to his friends, who controlled the largest number of fortifications, intending to make war against his mother. But the 73-year-old queen suddenly died in 67 BCE, so Aristobulus immediately directed his forces against his brother Hyrcanus, the legitimate heir to the throne.

== Rebellion ==
Hyrcanus advanced against Aristobulus at the head of his forces. When the brothers met in battle near Jericho, many of Hyrcanus's soldiers defected, joining forces with Aristobulus, thereby giving the latter the victory. Hyrcanus took refuge in the citadel of Jerusalem; but Aristobulus's capture of the Temple compelled Hyrcanus to surrender. A peace was then concluded, according to the terms of which Hyrcanus was to renounce the throne and the office of High Priest, but was to enjoy the revenues of the latter office.

This agreement did not last for long, as Antipater the Idumaean convinced Hyrcanus that Aristobulus was planning his death and to take refuge with Aretas III, King of the Nabataeans. The Nabataeans advanced toward Jerusalem with an army of 50,000 men and besieged the city for several months during the rebellion.

== Roman intervention ==
During this civil war, the Roman general Pompey defeated the Kingdoms of Pontus and the Seleucids. He sent his deputy Marcus Aemilius Scaurus to take possession of Seleucid Syria.

As the Hasmoneans were allies of the Romans, both brothers appealed to Scaurus, each endeavoring by gifts and promises to win him over to his side. Scaurus—moved by a gift of 400 talents—favored Aristobulus and ordered Aretas to withdraw his army. During their retreat, the Nabateans suffered a crushing defeat at the hands of Aristobulus.

When Pompey arrived in Damascus in 63 BCE, both brothers sent their delegates to him, in an attempt to win support for their cause (succession to the throne of Judea). A third party—that desired the removal of the entire Hasmonean dynasty—also appealed to Pompey. Pompey favored Hyrcanus over Aristobulus, deeming the elder, weaker brother a more reliable ally of the Roman Republic.

At this point, Aristobulus left Damascus and entrenched himself and his troops in the fortress of Alexandrium. Pompey marched into Judea with his forces, captured Aristobulus and his sons Alexander and Antigonus, and prepared to besiege Jerusalem. Hyrcanus's supporters opened a gate in the city wall, which allowed Pompey's forces to capture the upper city, including the Hasmonean royal palace.

Although Aristobulus had already been captured, his forces still held the eastern portions of the city, including the Temple Mount and the City of David. After a three-month siege of the Temple Mount, the siege finally ended after the Roman troops breached the city wall. Roman forces entered the temple precinct, killing approximately 12,000 Jewish defenders and badly damaging the temple. Hyrcanus was restored as High Priest but deprived of political authority. Pompey's conquest of Jerusalem spelled the end of independence for Judea, which became a client kingdom of the Roman Republic and later a province of the Roman Empire.

Aristobulus escaped in 57 BCE, instigating rebellion against Rome in Judea, until he was finally holed up by Aulus Gabinius, consul of the Roman province of Syria, in Machaerus. Mark Antony, commander of the cavalry under Gabinius, led several men to scale Aristobulus's fortifications and subdue his forces.

== Death ==
Taken prisoner, Aristobulus was released by Julius Caesar in 49 BCE to turn Judea against Pompey. He was on his way to Judaea with his son Alexander, when "he was taken off by poison given him by those of Pompey's party". His son Alexander was beheaded by the Roman commander Scipio at Antioch.

== Aftermath ==
Aristobulus's son Antigonus led a rebellion against Rome, with help from the Parthians, and became king and high priest in 40 BCE, but was defeated and killed by the Romans in 37 BCE.

== See also ==
- Hasmonean coinage
- Siege of Jerusalem (disambiguation), list of sieges for, and battles of, Jerusalem

Aristobulus II Hasmonean Dynasty Died: 49 BCE
Jewish titles
Preceded by Hyrcanus II	King of Judaea; 66–63 BCE	Succeeded by Hyrcanus II
Preceded by Hyrcanus II	High Priest of Judaea; 66–63 BCE	Succeeded by Hyrcanus II
