= Paralia (Seleucid eparchy) =

Eparchy in Palestine during Hellenistic and Roman times

- Eparchy of Coele-Syria province of the Seleucid Kingdom
- 197 BCE–99 BCE
- Historical era: Hellenistic era
  - Seleucid annexation: 197 BCE
  - Simon Thassi captured Jaffa: 143 BCE
  - John Hyrcanus captured Jamnia and Ashdod: 125 BCE
  - Conquests of Alexander Jannaeus: 103-99 BCE
  - Hasmonean dynasty conquest: 99 BCE
Preceded by	Succeeded by
Achaemenid Phoenicia	Hasmonean kingdom
- Today part of: Israel; Gaza Strip

The Paralia (Greek: Παραλία - beach), also known as Medinat HaYam (Hebrew: מדינת הים - country by the sea) was a coastal eparchy in Palestine during Hellenistic and Roman times, ruled by the Seleucid Empire between 197 and 99 BCE, as part of the Coele-Syria province. According to Josephus, the inhabitants of the region were primarily Greek city-dwellers. The name appears in the 6th-century Madaba Map, appended to the town of Ashdod-Yam, as Azotos Paralos (Greek: Αζωτος Παραλος), ca. 3 kilometers south of Modern Ashdod.

The region was originally set up by the Seleucids, along with the eparchies of Idumea and Galaaditis and neighbouring the eparchy of Samaria. Josephus wrote that the Paralia was outside Jewish jurisdiction throughout the Second Temple Period, except for a short period under the Hasmoneans and during the reign of Herod the Great and the Agrippas.

== Etymology ==
The region was described as the Coastal Country in 1 Maccabees (11:59; 15:38) and 2 Maccabees (13:24).

In earlier Halakha it was described at "Medinat HaYam" (cities of the sea).

== History ==
The region was originally set up by the Seleucids. The eparchy bordered Samaria, Idumea and Galaaditis, all part of the Coele-Syria province. Nicanor son of Patroclus was likely one of the governors of Paralia district, and was titled Cypriarch - apparently commanding some Cypriot garrison troops in the region, when Antiochus V Eupator acceded to the throne.

Part of the Paralia region was first conquered by Jews under the Hasmoneans. Simon Thassi captured Joppa in 143 BCE, John Hyrcanus captured Jamnia and Ashdod in 125 BCE, and between 103 and 99 BCE Alexander Jannaeus conquered the areas from Dora, northwards to Acra, and from Gaza, southwards to Rinocorura. The first penetration of Hasmoneans to Joppa was gradual - first a garrison was set up in the city, with later replacement of the pagan population by incoming Jews. Only Ashkelon was never conquered by the Hasmoneans.

== Demographics ==
According to Josephus, the inhabitants of the region were primarily Greek city-dwellers.

== See also ==
- Phoenice (Roman province)

== Sources ==
- Rosenfeld, Ben-Zion (2000), "Flavius Josephus and His Portrayal of the Coast (Paralia) of Contemporary Roman Palestine: Geography and Ideology", The Jewish Quarterly Review, 91 (1), University of Pennsylvania Press: 143–183, doi:10.2307/1454789, JSTOR 1454789
