= Salome Alexandra =

Queen of Hasmonean Judaea from c. 76 to 67 BC

- Salome Alexandra, from Guillaume Rouillé's Promptuarii Iconum Insigniorum

Queen of Judaea
- Reign: c. 76 – 67 BC
- Predecessor: Alexander Jannaeus
- Successor: Hyrcanus II

Queen consort of Judaea
- Tenure: c. 104–76 BC
- Born: c. 141 BC
- Died: c. 67 BC
- Spouse: Aristobulus I (c. 104 – 103 BC); Alexander Jannaeus (c. 103 – 76 BC)
- Issue: Hyrcanus II; Aristobulus II
- House: Hasmonean dynasty
- Father: Shetah (disputed)
- Mother
- Relatives: Simeon ben Shetach (brother)
- Religion: Judaism

Salome Alexandra, also Shlomtzion, Shelamzion (Ancient Greek: Σαλώμη Ἀλεξάνδρα; Hebrew: שְׁלוֹמְצִיּוֹן, Šəlōmṣīyyōn, "peace of Zion"; 141–67 BC), was a regnant queen of Hasmonean Judea, one of only three women in Jewish historical tradition to rule over the country, the other two being Deborah and Athaliah. The wife of Alexander Jannaeus, she was also the last ruler of Judea to die as the sovereign of an independent kingdom. Her nine-year reign has been described as a "golden age" of Hasmonean history. Many suspect that she had previously been married to Alexander Janneaus's older brother, Aristobolus I, but this is most likely a misidentification.

== Name ==
Josephus refers to the queen exclusively by her Greek name, Alexandra (Ἀλεξάνδρα), recording no Hebrew equivalent in either the War or the Antiquities. Her Semitic name is preserved in two Dead Sea Scroll fragments — 4Q331 (1-ii-7) and 4Q332 (2-4) — as Shelamzion, and historian Lester Grabbe notes that the variant Greek forms "Salina" and "Salome" likely represent attempts to render the same underlying Hebrew name, Šĕlamṣiyon. Rabbinic literature ignores the Greek name entirely, referring to her throughout by various Semitic forms.

According to historian Tal Ilan, she likely received the name "Alexandra" upon marrying Alexander Jannaeus. Salome's granddaughters also bore this name.

== Family ==
Josephus records nothing of Salome Alexandra's parentage; since he treats her as a legitimate Hasmonean monarch without describing her as having married into the dynasty, historian Kenneth Atkinson suggests she may herself have been of Hasmonean descent.

Hasmonean dynasty family tree

Rabbinical sources designate the rabbi Simeon ben Shetach as her brother, making her the daughter of Shetah as well. Historian Tal Ilan, however, argued that she did not belong to the Hasmonean dynasty, citing rabbinic passages identifying her as the sister of Simeon ben Shetach.

Salome Alexandra had two sons by Alexander Jannaeus: the elder, Hyrcanus II, and the younger, Aristobulus II. Their succession dispute following her death ended in the loss of Hasmonean independence and the Roman takeover of Judea.

== Consort ==
According to the Jewish Encyclopedia, Aristobulus I's wife (herein misidentified as Salome Alexandra) was instrumental in arranging the assassination of her brother-in-law, Antigonus, by convincing her husband (Aristobulus I) that the former was plotting against him.

Josephus does not explicitly attest to any political role for Alexandra before her reign. However, a passage in Antiquities (14.10) hints at one: describing the rise of Antipas, future grandfather of Herod the Great, Josephus notes that "King Alexander and his wife made him general of all Idumaea", implying Alexandra exercised some form of authority alongside her husband. On this hypothesis, advanced by Atkinson, Jannaeus designated her as his successor during his last years of illness (79–76 BCE), which would help explain why she, and not either of her two sons, succeeded him.

== Sole reign ==
=== Path to power ===
According to the Antiquities, Alexander Jannaeus fell mortally ill during the siege of Ragaba, a fortress in Gilead, and instructed Alexandra to conceal his death from the army until the fortress had fallen; on her return to Jerusalem, he advised her to surrender a measure of power to the Pharisees, who would secure her position in exchange through their popularity with the public. Jannaeus also requested that Alexandra hand his body to the Pharisees. Atkinson reads this as a calculated gambit: by inviting them to abuse his corpse, Jannaeus was confident that their own scruples, rooted in the biblical prohibition against desecrating the dead, would compel them to give him a dignified burial instead. The gesture's logic, Atkinson argues, presupposes that Jannaeus had himself violated that same prohibition, most likely during the mass crucifixions of the civil war.

The historicity of the deathbed scene is contested on several grounds. Steve Mason argues that the passage reflects Josephus's own composition rather than that of his source, Herod's court historian Nicolaus of Damascus, pointing to its vocabulary and rhetorical style as characteristic of Josephus himself, as well as what he sees as Josephus's pro-Hasmonean and anti-Pharisaic tendencies. He therefore concludes it was almost certainly "formulated (or freely invented)" by Josephus. Historian Daniel R. Schwartz reaches the opposite conclusion, identifying the vocabulary of the passage as characteristic of material Josephus derived from Nicolaus. Jacob Neusner, for his part, argues the story has been revised in the Pharisees' favor. According to Atkinson, this dispute is difficult to resolve because, while Josephus clearly drew on earlier sources, he selectively used and rewrote his materials to serve his own purposes, making source recovery highly conjectural.

=== Domestic policy ===
The feature that stands out in both of Josephus's accounts of Alexandra's reign is the political ascendancy of the Pharisees. The Antiquities records that she restored the Pharisaic ordinances John Hyrcanus had once abrogated after falling out with them, a restoration the War does not mention. Grabbe holds that the Pharisees' ability to impose their halakhah (collection of religious laws) as state law most likely originated under her. Historian Eyal Regev judges that her reconciliation with the faction that had opposed Jannaeus involved both a transfer of political authority and the reinstatement of Pharisaic legal practice. According to Josephus, the Pharisees used their new position to pursue vengeance against the advisers who had urged Jannaeus to crucify his eight hundred opponents, including one named Diogenes. Eventually a group of leading citizens (δυνατοί), backed by Aristobulus II, appealed to the queen for protection, and she allowed some of them to take charge of several fortresses, with the exception of Hyrcania, Alexandrium and Machaerus.

Several scholars, including David Flusser and Iosif Amusin, have dated Pesher Nahum (4QpNah 3–4) — a sectarian biblical commentary from Qumran — to Alexandra's reign. Their argument turns on the phrase memshelet dorshei ha-halaqot ("dominion of the Seekers-after-Smooth-Things"), with the term "The Seekers After Smooth Things" widely understood as the Qumran community's polemical label for the Pharisees: the phrase, they argue, mirrors Josephus's depiction of a queen whose effective power rested with the Pharisees. On this reading, the work's references to the slain, captives, and exile reflect Pharisaic retaliation against Jannaeus's Sadducean supporters during her reign. Shani Berrin challenges this on two grounds. First, she argues that memshelet does not carry a fixed political meaning in Qumran usage and need not denote formal rule. More decisively, the sufferings the text describes, including sword, captivity, plunder, exile, fall on the Seekers-after-Smooth-Things themselves rather than being inflicted by them, casting them as victims rather than as the dominant power, which sits awkwardly with the thesis of Pharisaic dominance.

Sectarian alignments may also be visible among Alexandra's two sons. Hyrcanus II, the elder, was appointed high priest by his mother and is presented as siding with the Pharisees, while her younger son, Aristobulus II is associated with the Sadducees both in Josephus and, in Regev's reading, in Pesher Nahum.

=== Military and foreign policy ===
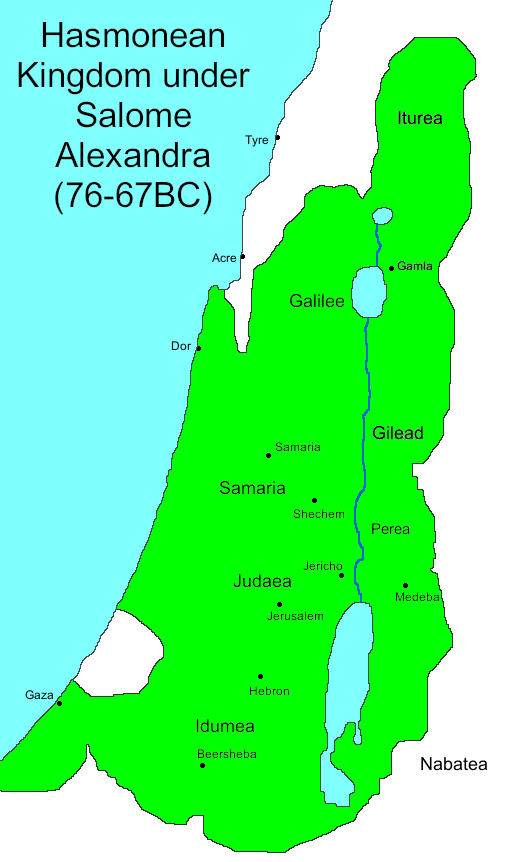
Hasmonean Kingdom under Salome Alexandra

Alexandra ran an activist military administration. According to Josephus, she doubled the size of the Jewish army, maintained a substantial mercenary force, and took hostages from neighboring rulers, inspiring fear among them. These policies led Grabbe to rate her overall as a "good administrator" who kept generally "peaceful relations with the surrounding rulers".

Alexandra's first military campaign, summarized by Josephus in just two sentences in both the War and the Antiquities, sent Aristobulus II with an army to Damascus to counter the Iturean leader Ptolemy son of Mennaeus, who was harassing the city. Josephus regards the expedition as unproductive. Damascus lay far beyond any realistic sphere of Hasmonean control, and Atkinson notes that the venture risked antagonizing both Aretas III, king of Nabatea, who had reason to avenge Jannaeus's earlier incursions, and the Seleucids. Atkinson suggests, however, that Alexandra may have been responding to Tigranes II of Armenia's seizure of Damascus in 72/1 BCE, and that she may have acted in concert with Aretas III and Cleopatra Selene, and possibly even Ptolemy the Iturean, whom Josephus presents as the cause of the intervention, to resist Tigranes's expansion.

A consequential foreign episode involved Tigranes II of Armenia directly. By 72/1 BCE, Tigranes had seized Damascus and was besieging Cleopatra Selene at Akko-Ptolemais, placing him in a position to annex the rest of Syria and invade Hasmonean territory. Alexandra concluded terms with him, apparently anticipating that Judea would be his next target. Grabbe presents the intervention as a diplomatic agreement, while Atkinson argues she effectively forced Tigranes to abandon his expansionist plans, allowing him to withdraw peacefully in exchange. In any case, Tigranes was compelled to withdraw to Armenia when Mithridates VI of Pontus retreated there following his defeat by the Roman general Lucullus. Cleopatra Selene, rather than being saved by Alexandra, appears to have attacked Tigranes from the rear as he retreated, was captured, and executed on his orders at Seleucia. Atkinson argues that by detaining Tigranes at Ptolemais, Alexandra inadvertently slowed his return to Armenia, contributing to the fall of his capital Tigranocerta to Lucullus, and thereby to Rome's growing foothold in the region that Pompey would later exploit for his conquest of Judea.

=== Title ===
Historian Uriel Rappaport argues that Salome Alexandra's rule is best understood against the background of the declining Hellenistic monarchies rather than Jewish dynastic norms: a woman governing with two adult sons available as heirs has no precedent in the latter, but fits naturally within a world in which queens of the late Ptolemaic and Seleucid houses sometimes ruled in their own right. On this reading, the Hebrew title "queen" and the relative warmth of her reception in Jewish tradition do not obscure the fundamentally Hellenistic character of her position, as she occupied her late husband's throne much as a Hellenistic basilissa would.

=== Material culture ===
According to archaeologist Ehud Netzer, Alexandra was responsible for building the so-called "Twin Palaces" in the Hasmonean palatial complex west of Jericho – two adjoining mirror-image mansions of roughly equal dimensions, built, in his reconstruction, for her two sons. Regev observes that both are markedly more modest than the much larger "Buried Palace" attributed to John Hyrcanus, who held only the high priesthood and no royal title — an inverted relationship between royal status and architectural scale that complicates any straightforward reading of Hasmonean self-presentation. More strikingly, Regev identifies small but telling differences between the two mansions: the ritual bath in the eastern mansion is connected to a water reservoir (otzar) by a plastered channel, while the parallel installation in the western mansion lacks one. He interprets this as reflecting halakhic affiliation: the presence of the otzar connection was a characteristically Pharisaic feature that could be expected under Hyrcanus II, whereas its absence in the western mansion is consistent with Aristobulus II's Sadducean allegiances.

No surviving coin bears Alexandra's name. Regev argues that large quantities of the crude "year 25" issues struck in Jannaeus's name were minted posthumously under her authority, fitting a recognized Hellenistic pattern of successors issuing coins in a prestigious predecessor's name. Atkinson regards the theory as unproven.

== Death and succession ==
Toward the end of her life, Salome Alexandra fell seriously ill, and her younger son Aristobulus II moved against her. He took twenty-two fortresses garrisoned by his supporters, recruited a mercenary force with help from Lebanon, Trachonitis, and other regional leaders, and declared himself king, justifying the move with the claim that the Pharisees would otherwise seize power upon his mother's death. Alexandra responded by detaining his wife (who had reportedly been aware of the plot) and children in the Baris fortress near the Jerusalem Temple, and authorizing Hyrcanus II and his partisans to take whatever measures were needed against him. She died at seventy-three after a nine-year reign, shortly before the conflict between her sons erupted into open civil war — a struggle that ended in 63 BCE with Pompey's conquest of Jerusalem, the incorporation of Hasmonean Judea as a Roman vassal state, and the installation of Hyrcanus II as high priest, but not king, of Judea.

== Assessment and legacy ==
=== Portrayal in ancient sources ===
Josephus's assessments of Salome Alexandra diverge sharply between his two works. The Jewish War presents her as a dynamic and capable monarch whose piety was exploited by the Pharisees, whereas the Antiquities foregrounds her gullibility and casts the Pharisees as the real holders of power. The latter closes with a hostile obituary that blames subsequent misfortunes on her reign, casting her as a despot who lacked the restraint normally expected of a woman.

In contrast, rabbinic literature, compiled over the centuries following Alexandra's death and reaching its final form in late antiquity, preserves a positive memory of her reign. Works such as Sifra (Behuqqotai i.110) and the Babylonian Talmud (Ta'anit 23a) depict it as a kind of golden age. According to these passages, in the days of Salome Alexandra and Shimon ben Shetah, "rain [invariably] fell for them on Wednesday eves and on Shabbat eves, until wheat grew [as big] as kidneys, and barley [as big] as olive pits, and lentils as golden dinars. And they tied [up some] of [these crops] as an example for [future] generations, to convey [to them] how much [damage] sin causes." (Note: Babylonian Talmud, Taanit 23a, The William Davidson Talmud, Koren–Steinsaltz edition)

=== In medieval sources ===
According to some versions of the Toledoth Yeshu, a medieval alternative-Christian life of Jesus, Salome is connected with Jesus of Nazareth, placing the death of Jesus 150 years earlier.

=== Modern legacy ===
"Shlomtzion" (Hebrew: שלומציון) is sometimes used as a female first name in contemporary Israel. Among others, the well-known Israeli writer Amos Kenan gave the name to his daughter.

During the British Mandate of Palestine, a major street in Jerusalem was called Princess Mary Street, after the only daughter of King George V and Queen Mary. After the creation of Israel, the street was renamed "Queen Shlomzion Street," to commemorate the Jewish queen. Such street names exist also in Tel Aviv and Ramat Gan.

In the 1977 Knesset elections Ariel Sharon accepted the advice of Kenan to name his new political party "Shlomtzion" (it later merged with the Likud).

Israeli zoologists carefully observing the leopards of the Judean Desert bestowed the name "Shlomtzion" on a female leopard whose life, mating, and offspring were the subject of intensive, years-long study. In 1996, her body was found in Tze'elim Stream, having died of old age.

== See also ==
- Hasmonean coinage

== Bibliography ==
=== Sources ===
- Atkinson, Kenneth (2016). A History of the Hasmonean State: Josephus and Beyond. Bloomsbury. pp. 134–145. ISBN 9780567669032.
- Berrin, Shani (2004). The Pesher Nahum Scroll from Qumran: An Exegetical Study of 4Q169. Studies on the Texts of the Desert of Judah. Vol. 53. Leiden: Brill. ISBN 978-90-04-12484-4.
- Grabbe, Lester L. (2020). A History of the Jews and Judaism in the Second Temple Period, Volume 4: The Jews under the Roman Shadow (4 BCE–150 CE). The Library of Second Temple Studies. T&T Clark. ISBN 978-0567700704.
- Ilan, Tal (1987). "Greek Names of the Hasmoneans". Jewish Quarterly Review. 78: 1–20.
- Mason, Steve (1991). Flavius Josephus on the Pharisees. Leiden: Brill. ISBN 978-90-04-50910-8.
- Neusner, Jacob (1973). From Politics to Piety. Englewood Cliffs: Prentice-Hall. ISBN 978-0133314397.
- Rappaport, Uriel (1991). "The Hasmonean State and Hellenism / על 'התייוונותם' של החשמונאים". Tarbiz / תרביץ (in Hebrew). ס (4): 477–503. ISSN 0334-3650.
- Regev, Eyal (2013). The Hasmoneans: Ideology. Archaeology, Identity. Journal of Ancient Judaism Supplements. Göttingen: Vandenhoeck & Ruprecht.
- Schwartz, Daniel R. (1983). "Josephus and Nicolaus on the Pharisees". Journal for the Study of Judaism. 14: 157–171.

Salome Alexandra Hasmonean Dynasty Born: 141 BC Died: 67 BC
| Preceded by Alexander Jannaeus | Queen of Judaea; 76 BCE – 67 BCE | Succeeded by Hyrcanus II |
