= Seleucia Samulias =

Seleucia Samulias – Seleucia (Greek: Σελεύκεια) also transliterated as Seleukeia or Seleukheia; in the Talmud, Selik, Selika, and Selikos; in the Aramaic Targum, Salwaḳia or Salwaḳya – was a Hellenistic colony founded about the end of the 3rd century BC on Lake Merom. According to the inference of Grätz, based on the scholium to Meg. Ta'an., the remnant of the Pharisees spared by Alexander Jannæus found a refuge there. Seleucia and Sogane were the first cities, after Gamala, to revolt from Agrippa in the Jewish Revolt of 66. In his enumeration of the places conquered by Alexander Jannæus in eastern Syria, Josephus locates the town near Lake Semechonitis (Lake Merom) (Bell. Jud. iv. 1, § 1). ^{[usurped]} Targum Pseudo-Jonathan and Targum Neofiti translate Salecah in Deuteronomy 3:10 as Seleucia, though the biblical Salecah was probably in the eastern Bashan, perhaps at contemporary Salkhad.

== See also ==
- Tel Anafa
