= Alexander Jannaeus =

King and High Priest of Hasmonean Judea (r. c. 103–76 BC)

- King and High Priest of Judea
- Portrait from Promptuarium Iconum Insigniorum (1553) by Guillaume Rouillé

King of Judea
- Reign: c. 103 – c. 76 BC
- Predecessor: Aristobulus I
- Successor: Salome Alexandra

High Priest of Judea
- Reign: c. 103 – c. 76 BC
- Predecessor: Aristobulus I
- Successor: Hyrcanus II
- Born: c. 130 BC
- Died: c. 76 BC; Ragaba
- Spouse: Salome Alexandra
- Issue: Hyrcanus II; Aristobulus II
- Dynasty: Hasmonean
- Father: John Hyrcanus
- Religion: Hellenistic Judaism

Alexander Jannaeus (Ancient Greek: Ἀλέξανδρος Ἰανναῖος Aléxandros Iannaîos, English: "Alexander Jannaios", usually Latinised to "Alexander Jannaeus"; Hebrew: יַנַּאי Yannaʾy; born Jonathan יהונתן) was the second king of the Hasmonean dynasty, who ruled over an expanding kingdom of Judea from 103 to 76 BC. A son of John Hyrcanus, he inherited the throne from his brother Aristobulus I. From his conquests to expand the kingdom to a bloody civil war, Alexander's reign has been described as cruel and oppressive with never-ending conflict. The major historical sources of Alexander's life are Josephus's Antiquities of the Jews and The Jewish War.

Under Alexander Jannaeus, the Hasmonean kingdom reached its greatest territorial extent, encompassing most of the Mediterranean coastline of the Land of Israel and the regions surrounding the Jordan River. His reign was defined by nearly continuous conflict, including campaigns against Hellenistic cities, Nabataean forces in the east, and Seleucid armies in the north. Domestically, he faced fierce opposition, particularly from the Pharisees, due to his autocratic rule, reliance on mercenaries, heavy taxation, and controversial religious policies. These tensions culminated in a violent civil war and the mass execution of his opponents. He died around 76 BC during the siege of Ragaba and was succeeded as ruler by his wife, Salome Alexandra.

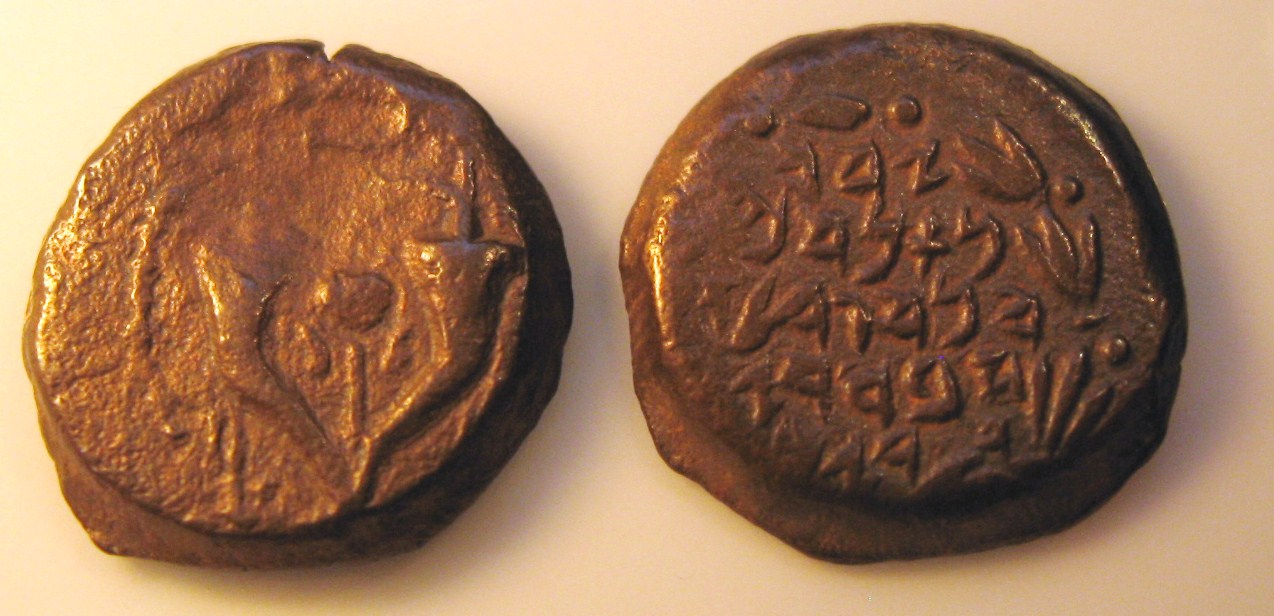
A bronze prutah coin of Alexander Jannaeus. Obverse: the Paleo-Hebrew inscription "Jonathan the High Priest and the Council of the Jews". Reverse: a pair of Cornucopias or Horns of Plenty, which were a Hellenistic and Roman symbol. The pomegranate in the center of the coin gives it a Jewish aspect. Pomegranate appears on many Hasmonean coins. Itamar Atzmon Collection

== Family ==
Alexander Jannaeus was the third son of John Hyrcanus by his second wife. When Aristobulus I, Hyrcanus's son by his first wife, became king, he deemed it necessary for his own security to imprison his half-brother. Aristobulus died after a reign of one year. Upon his death in 103 BCE, his widow had Alexander and his brothers released from prison. One of these brothers is said to have unsuccessfully sought the throne.

Alexander's wife and queen was Salome Alexandra. By her he had two sons: the eldest, Hyrcanus II, became high priest in 62 BC; and Aristobulus II, who was high priest from 66 to 62 BCE and started a bloody civil war with his brother, ending in his capture by Pompey the Great.

Like his brother, Alexander was an avid supporter of the aristocratic priestly faction known as the Sadducees. His wife Salome however came from a Pharisaic family. Her brother was Simeon ben Shetach, a Pharisee leader. Salome was therefore more sympathetic to their cause, and protected them throughout Alexander’s turbulent reign.

Like his father, Alexander served as high priest. This raised the ire of the Pharisees, who insisted that these two offices should not be combined. They also said that Alexander was not allowed to serve as high priest, because his mother had been captured and raped in Modi'in. This infuriated the king and led him to turn against the Pharisees, and he persecuted them until his death.

== War with Ptolemy Lathyrus ==
Alexander's first expedition was against the city of Ptolemais. While Alexander went ahead to besiege the city, Zoilus of Dora took the opportunity to see if he could relieve Ptolemais in hopes of establishing his rule over coastal territories. Alexander's Hasmonean army quickly defeated Zoilus's forces. Ptolemais then requested aid from Ptolemy IX Lathyros, who had been banished by his mother Cleopatra III. Ptolemy had founded a kingdom in Cyprus after being cast out by his mother.

The situation at Ptolemais was seized as an opportunity by Ptolemy to possibly gain a stronghold and control the Judean coast in order to invade Egypt by sea. An individual named Demaenetus convinced the inhabitants of their imprudence in requesting Ptolemy's assistance. They realised that by allying themselves with Ptolemy, they had unintentionally declared war on Cleopatra. When Ptolemy arrived at the city, the inhabitants denied him access.

Alexander too didn't want to be involved in a war between Cleopatra and Ptolemy, so he abandoned his campaign against Ptolemais and returned to Jerusalem. After offering Ptolemy four hundred talents and a peace treaty in return for Zoilus's death, Alexander met him with treachery by negotiating an alliance with Cleopatra. Once he had formed an alliance with Ptolemy, Alexander continued his conquests by capturing the coastal cities of Dora and Straton's Tower.

As soon as Ptolemy learned of Alexander's scheme, he was determined to kill him. Ptolemy put Ptolemais under siege, but left his generals to attack the city, while he continued to pursue Alexander. Ptolemy's pursuit caused much destruction in the Galilee region. Here he captured Asochis on the Sabbath, taking ten thousand people as prisoners. Ptolemy also initiated an unsuccessful attack on Sepphoris.

=== Battle of Asophon ===
Ptolemy and Alexander engaged in battle at Asophon near the Jordan River. Estimated to have fifty to eighty thousand soldiers, Alexander's army consisted of both Jews and pagans. At the head of his armed forces were his elite pagan mercenaries. They were specialised in Greek-style phalanx. One of Ptolemy's commanders, Philostephanus, began the first attack by crossing the river that divided both forces.

The Hasmoneans had the advantage. Philostephanus held back a certain amount of his forces whom he sent to recover lost ground. Perceiving them as vast reinforcements, Alexander's army fled. Some of his retreating forces tried to push back, but quickly dispersed as Ptolemy's forces pursued Alexander's fleeing army. Thirty to fifty thousand Hasmonean soldiers died.

Ptolemy's forces at Ptolemais succeeded in capturing the city. He then continued to conquer much of the Hasmonean kingdom, occupying the entirety of northern Judea, the coast, and territories east of the Jordan River. While doing so, he pillaged villages and ordered his soldiers to butcher and boil captured women and children, in a show of pretended cannibalism meant to terrorize his enemies. At the time, Salome Alexandra was notified of Cleopatra's approach to Judea.

=== Intervention of Cleopatra III ===
Realising that her son had amassed a formidable force in Judea, Cleopatra appointed Jewish generals Ananias and Chelkias to command her forces. She went with a fleet towards Judea. When Cleopatra arrived at Ptolemais, the people refused her entry, so she besieged the city. Ptolemy, believing Syria was defenseless, withdrew to Cyprus after his miscalculation. While in pursuit of Ptolemy, Chelkias died in Coele-Syria.

The war abruptly came to an end with Ptolemy fleeing to Cyprus. Alexander then approached Cleopatra. Bowing before her, he requested to retain his rule. Cleopatra was urged by her subordinates to annex Judea. Ananias demanded she consider the residential Egyptian Jews who were the main support of her throne. This induced Cleopatra to modify her longings for Judea. Alexander met her demands and suspended his campaigns. These negotiations took place at Scythopolis. Cleopatra died five years later. Confident, after her death, Alexander found himself free to continue with new campaigns.

== Campaigns in Transjordan and the southern coast ==
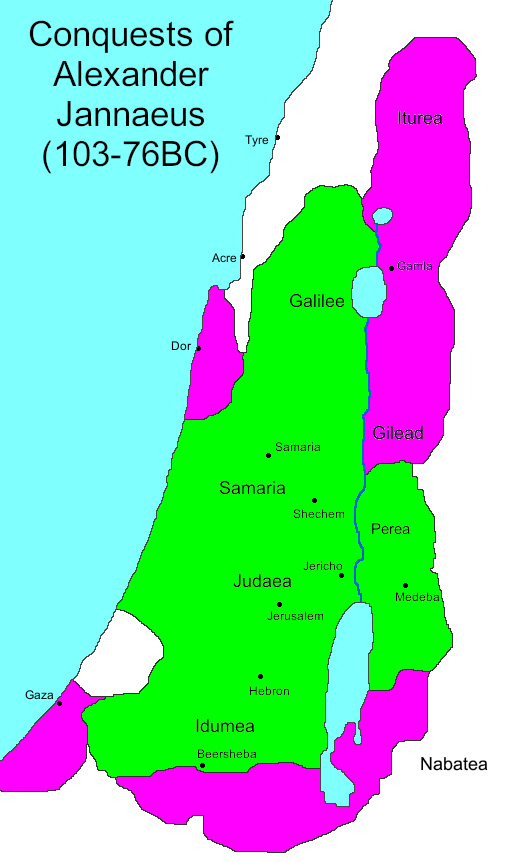
The Hasmonean Kingdom under Alexander Jannaeus situation in 103 BCE area conquered

Alexander captured Gadara after a ten-month siege, then took the fortress of Amathus, where the local ruler Theodorus routed his army in a surprise attack and recovered his lost treasures. He was more successful in his expedition against the coastal cities, capturing Raphia and Anthedon. In 96 BCE, Jannaeus defeated the inhabitants of Gaza, the Mediterranean outlet of the main Nabataean trade route. Alexander returned his focus back to the Transjordan region where, avenging his previous defeat, he destroyed Amathus.

According to Menahem Stern, one of the principal aims of Nabataean policy during this period was to control the trade routes linking their capital, Petra, with Gaza and Egypt, and with Damascus and the Phoenician cities. The conflict between the Hasmoneans and the Nabataeans, in his view, arose primarily from the overlapping territorial ambitions of the two kingdoms. Ascalon, by contrast, remained outside the Hasmonean kingdom; Stern argued that its alliance with Egypt throughout Jannaeus's reign helped shield the city from Hasmonean conquest.

=== Battle of Gaza ===
Undeterred by his setback at Amathus, Alexander turned his attention to Gaza, Alexander set his focus on Gaza. The city was important in the regional trade system as the export port for eastern goods carried by the Nabataeans and was closely linked to their kingdom. A victory against the city was not so easily achieved. Gaza's general Apollodotus strategically employed a night attack against the Hasmonean army. With a force of two thousand less-skilled soldiers and ten thousand slaves, Gaza's military was able to deceive the Hasmonean army into believing they were being attacked by Ptolemy. The Gazans killed many and the Hasmonean army fled the battle. When morning exposed the delusive tactic, Alexander continued his assault but lost a thousand additional soldiers.

The Gazans remained defiant in hopes that the Nabataean kingdom would come to their aid. The city eventually suffered defeat due to its own leadership. Gaza at the time was governed by two brothers, Lysimachus and Apollodotus. Lysimachus convinced the people to surrender, and Alexander peacefully entered the city. Though he at first seemed peaceful, Alexander suddenly turned against the inhabitants. Some men killed their wives and children out of desperation, to ensure they wouldn't be captured and enslaved. Others burned down their homes to prevent the soldiers from plundering. The town council and five hundred civilians took refuge at the Temple of Apollo, where Alexander had them massacred.

=== War with Obodas I ===
The Judean Civil War initially began after the conquest of Gaza around 96 BCE. Due to Jannaeus's victory at Gaza, the Nabataean kingdom no longer had direct access to the Mediterranean Sea. Alexander soon captured Gadara, which together with the loss of Gaza caused the Nabataeans to lose their main trade routes leading to Rome and Damascus. He soon lost Gadara, and the Nabataean king Obodas I ambushed him in a rugged ravine near a village called Gadara, in Gaulanitis, where he was pushed "by a multitude of camels" and barely escaped with his life. Jannaeus returned to Jerusalem, and was met with fierce Jewish opposition.

In his war with Obodas, Jannaeus suffered a severe defeat in the Golan after Obodas deployed camel-mounted troops, and escaped with difficulty to Jerusalem.

== Judean Civil War ==
=== Feast of Tabernacles ===
During the Jewish holiday Sukkot, Alexander Jannaeus, while officiating as the High Priest at the Temple in Jerusalem, demonstrated his displeasure against the Pharisees by refusing to perform the water libation ceremony properly: instead of pouring it on the altar, he poured it on his feet. The crowd responded with shock at his mockery and showed their displeasure by pelting him with etrogim (citrons). They made the situation worse by insulting him. They called him a descendant of a captive woman and unsuitable to hold office and to sacrifice. Outraged, he killed six thousand people. Alexander also had wooden barriers built around the altar and the temple preventing people from going near him. Only the priests were permitted to enter. This incident during the Feast of Tabernacles was a major factor leading up to the Judean Civil War.

=== War with Demetrius III and conclusion of the Civil War ===
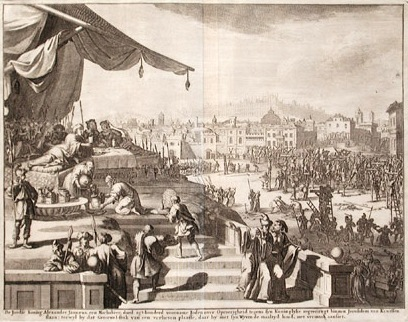
Alexander Jannaeus feasting during the crucifixion of the Pharisees, engraving by Willem Swidde, 17th century

After Jannaeus succeeded early in the war, the rebels asked for Seleucid assistance. Judean insurgents joined forces with Demetrius III Eucaerus to fight against Jannaeus. Alexander had gathered six thousand two hundred mercenaries and twenty thousand Jews for battle. Demetrius had forty thousand soldiers and three thousand horses. There were attempts from both sides to persuade each other to abandon positions, but were unsuccessful. The Seleucid forces defeated Jannaeus at Shechem, and all of Alexander's mercenaries were killed in battle.

This defeat forced Alexander to take refuge in the mountains. In sympathy towards Jannaeus, six thousand Judean rebels ultimately returned to him. In fear of this news, Demetrius withdrew. War between Jannaeus and the rebels who returned to him continued. They fought until Alexander achieved victory. Most of the rebels died in battle, while the remaining rebels fled to the city of Bethoma until they were defeated.

Jannaeus had brought the surviving rebels back to Jerusalem where he had eight hundred Jews, primarily Pharisees, crucified. Before their deaths, Alexander had the rebels' wives and children executed before their eyes as Jannaeus ate with his concubines. The Nahum Commentary, a sectarian text from Qumran, refers to the execution of opponents by a figure identified by scholars as Alexander Jannaeus, portrayed as the "Lion of Wrath" who hanged members of the group called the "Seekers-after-smooth-things" (דורשי החלקות), understood to be the Pharisees, for seeking support from "Demetrius king of Greece". Excavations at the modern-day Russian Compound in Jerusalem uncovered a sealed cistern containing the remains of at least 124 individuals, many exhibiting signs of decapitation and deliberate trauma, with no evidence of resistance or combat. According to the excavators, the burial may reflect a massacre of civilians carried out by Alexander Jannaeus.

Alexander later returned the land he had seized in Moab and Galaaditis from the Nabataeans in order to have them end their support for the Jewish rebels. The remaining rebels who numbered eight thousand, fled by night in fear of Alexander. Afterward, all rebel hostility ceased and Alexander's reign continued undisturbed.

=== Final campaigns ===
From 83 to 80 BCE, Alexander continued campaigning in the east. The Nabataean king Aretas III managed to defeat Alexander in battle near Adida, not far from Lydda. According to Josephus, Aretas withdrew after reaching an agreement with Jannaeus. However, Alexander continued expanding the Hasmonean kingdom into Transjordan. In Gaulanitis, he captured the cities of Golan, Seleucia, and Gamala. In Galaaditis, the cities of Pella, Dium, and Gerasa. According to Josephus, Alexander destroyed Pella because its inhabitants refused to Judaize. Aryeh Kasher wrote that the extent of Pella's destruction is uncertain. He noted that Josephus's language need not imply that the city was completely razed, suggesting instead that destruction may have been directed primarily at temples and pagan monuments. Other public buildings associated with Hellenistic civic culture, such as the gymnasium and theater, were possibly affected as well.

Stern noted that Josephus does not explain the reversal from the agreement between Aretas and Jannaeus to Jannaeus's subsequent conquests in Transjordan, in areas of strong Nabataean interest. He therefore argued that Josephus's account omits a significant part in the sequence of events. The Nabataeans were able to recover twelve cities they had lost in their wars with Jannaeus only through negotiations with his elder son, Hyrcanus II, during his succession war with his younger brother, Aristobulus II.

== Coinage and construction projects ==
Jannaeus's coins are the most abundant Jewish currency found at Hasmonean-era sites; According to Kenneth Atkinson, their low quality and high volume point to economic instability under his rule.

He is believed to have expanded and fortified the Hasmonean palace near Jericho.

== Death ==
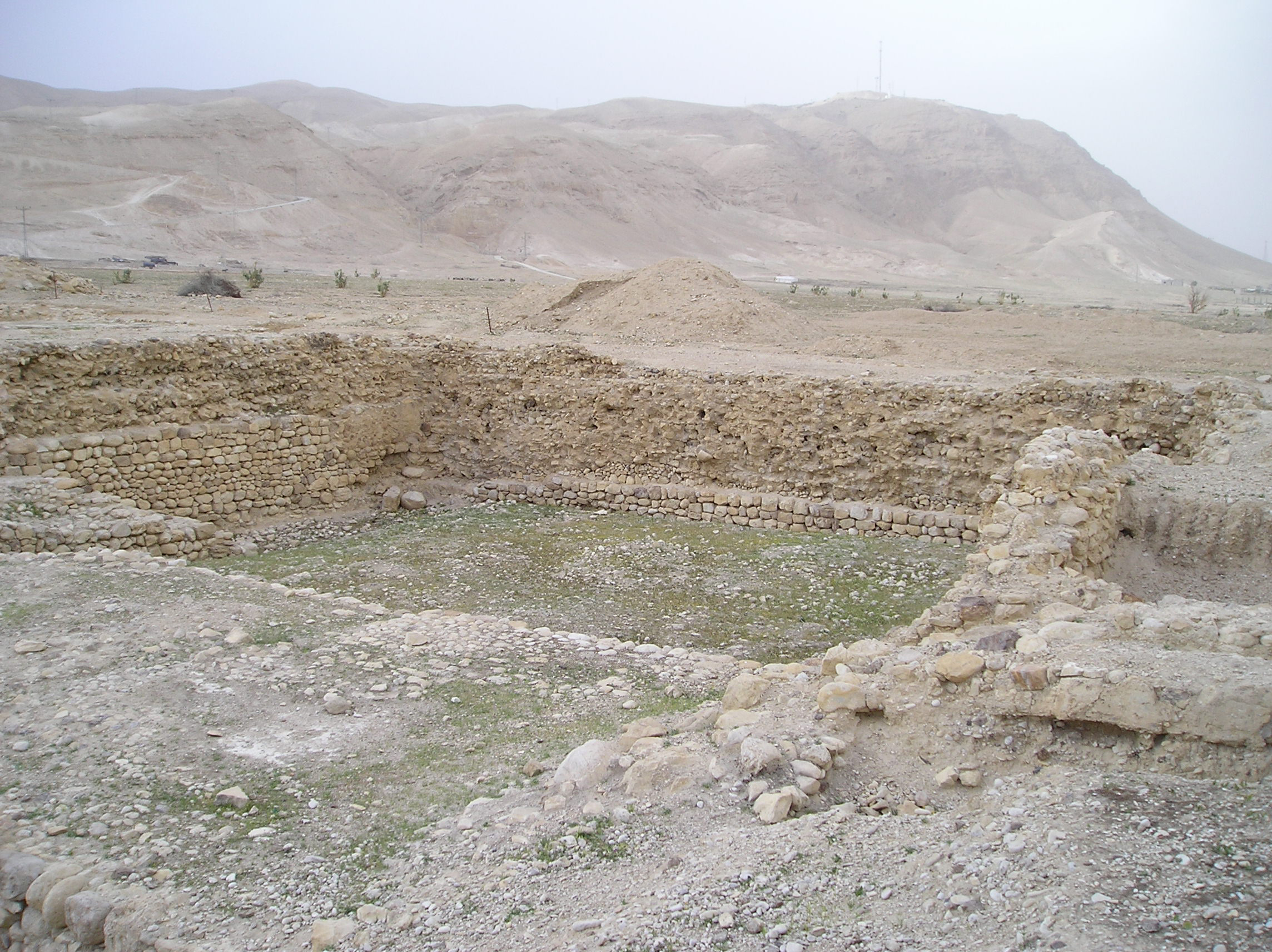
Swimming pool at the Hasmonean palace near Jericho, believed to have been built by Alexander

For the last three years of his life, Alexander Jannaeus suffered from the combined effects of heavy drinking and quartan ague (malaria).

After a reign of 27 years, he died c. 76 BCE at the age of fifty-one, during the siege of Ragaba.

In Josephus's "Antiquities," he presents an account that differs from his earlier "War" and Syncellus's accounts. According to Josephus, Jannaeus fell fatally ill on the battlefield at Ragaba, with his wife Salome Alexandra present. Jannaeus instructed her to hide his death until she captured Ragaba and to subsequently share power with the Pharisees. He also requested that she allow the Pharisees to abuse his corpse, believing they would then give him an honorable burial, despite this request violating Deuteronomy 21:22-23. This request is interpreted as Jannaeus seeking atonement for previously violating this commandment by abusing the bodies of crucified Pharisees. Kenneth Atkinson writes that Josephus's style and wording suggest Jannaeus died in Jerusalem and never reached Ragaba. In his view, Josephus may have concealed this fact to hide the undignified nature of this death.

Alexander's reign ended with a significant political decision, naming his wife as successor and granting her the authority to appoint the next high priest.

The tomb of Alexander Jannaeus was located in Jerusalem, north of the Temple Mount, within the area enclosed by the Third Wall. According to Josephus, fighting between the Romans under Titus and the rebel faction led by John of Gischala occurred near his memorials during the siege of Jerusalem in 70 CE.

== Historiography ==
Jannaeus's reign, and the campaigns by which he expanded Judea's borders, benefited from an unusually favourable set of circumstances. By the late 2nd century BCE, the Seleucid Empire had been weakened by dynastic conflict, many Hellenistic cities in the region had gained substantial autonomy, and several local rulers had carved out small independent polities of their own. Roman intervention, meanwhile, remained limited. Menahem Stern considered this political environment a major factor in allowing the Hasmonean kingdom to reach its greatest territorial extent under Jannaeus.

Kasher has argued that Josephus's account of Jannaeus's wars against the Hellenistic cities was distorted by his reliance on hostile, tendentious sources. In Kasher's reconstruction, these conflicts stemmed from long-standing mutual hostility rather than an arbitrary policy of "imperialist" expansion. He contends that Josephus downplayed motives such as the biblical ideal of reclaiming the land and suppressing polytheistic cults, the Hellenistic cities' role in anti-Jewish persecution dating back to Antiochus IV, and their ongoing pressure on Jewish communities. Stern similarly argued that Josephus's sources for this period omit important political context, pointing in particular to Nicolaus of Damascus (Herod's court historian, of Syrian-Greek background), whom he believed sought to minimize Jannaeus's own achievements.

== Bibliography ==
- Atkinson, Kenneth (2012). Queen Salome: Jerusalem's Warrior Monarch of the First Century B.C.E. McFarland. ISBN 9780786490738.
- Atkinson, Kenneth (2016). A History of the Hasmonean State: Josephus and Beyond. Bloomsbury Publishing. ISBN 9780567669032.
- Atkinson, Kenneth (2025). "Alexander Jannaeus". In Stuckenbruck, Loren T.; Gurtner, Daniel M. (eds.). T&T Clark Encyclopedia of Second Temple Judaism. Vol. II. T&T Clark. pp. 14–15. ISBN 978-0567716910.
- Eshel, Hanan (2008). The Dead Sea Scrolls and the Hasmonean State. Wm. B. Eerdmans Publishing. ISBN 9780802862853.
- Fitzgerald, John Thomas; Obbink, Dirk D.; Holland, Glenn Stanfield (2004). Philodemus and the New Testament World. BRILL. ISBN 9789004114609.
- Gelb, Norman (2010). Kings of the Jews: The Origins of the Jewish Nation. Jewish Publication Society. ISBN 9780827609136.
- Kaiser, Walter C. (1998). History of Israel. B&H Publishing Group. ISBN 9780805431223.
- Kasher, Aryeh (1986). "מלחמתו של המלך ינאי בערים ההלניסטיות באספקלריה של כתבי יוסף בן מתתיהו" [Josephus on King Jannaeus' War Against the Hellenistic Cities]. Cathedra: For the History of Eretz Israel and Its Yishuv / קתדרה: לתולדות ארץ ישראל ויישובה (41). Yad Izhak Ben Zvi / יד יצחק בן-צבי: 11–36. ISSN 0334-4657.
- Lieberman, Tehillah; Arbiv, Kfir; Nagar, Yossi (2020). "The Wrath of the Lion: Evidence of a Mass-Burial in Hasmonean Jerusalem". Tel Aviv. 47 (1): 89–107. doi:10.1080/03344355.2020.1707448.
- Saldarini, Anthony J. (2001). Pharisees, Scribes and Sadducees in Palestinian Society: A Sociological Approach. Wm. B. Eerdmans Publishing. ISBN 9780802843586.
- Schäfer, Peter (2003). The History of the Jews in the Greco-Roman World: The Jews of Palestine from Alexander the Great to the Arab Conquest (2nd Revised ed.). Routledge. ISBN 9781134403165.
- Stern, Menahem (1964). "הרקע המדיני למלחמותיו של אלכסנדר ינאי" [The Political Background of the Wars of Alexander Jannai]. Tarbiz / תרביץ. לג (ד). Mandel Institute for Jewish Studies / המכון למדעי היהדות ע"ש מנדל: 325–336. ISSN 0334-3650.
- Whiston, William, ed. (1895). The Complete Works of Flavius-Josephus the Celebrated Jewish Historian. Philadelphia: John E. Potter & Company.

Alexander Jannaeus of Judea Hasmonean Dynasty Died: 76 BCE
Jewish titles
Preceded by Aristobulus I	King of Judea; 103–76 BCE	Succeeded by Salome Alexandra
Preceded by Aristobulus I	High Priest of Judea; 103–76 BCE	Succeeded by Hyrcanus II
