= Rajeb =

Town in Ajloun Governorate, known as Ragaba/Regev in antiquity

Rajeb راجب
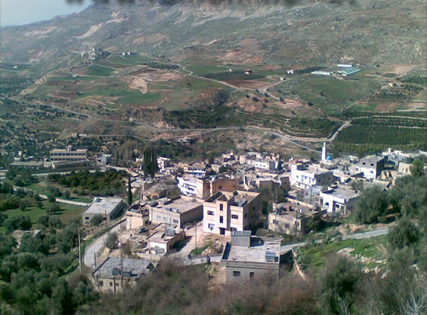

- Location in Jordan
- Coordinates: 32°14′20″N 35°41′45″E
- PAL: 215/183
- Country: Jordan
- Governorate: Ajloun Governorate
- Time zone: UTC + 2

Rajeb or Rajib (Arabic: راجب) is a village in the Ajloun Governorate in northwestern Jordan. In classical sources, Ar Rajib is known as Reğeb (Ragaba).

== History ==
Rajeb is identified with the ancient fortress of Reğeb (Hebrew: רגב), or Ragaba (Greek: Ράγκαβα). According to the historical accounts by Flavius Josephus, a Jewish historian from the first century AD, Alexander Jannaeus, king of Judaea, died during a siege at this location (around 76 BC). The Mishnah notes that Reğeb was renowned for its olive oil.

A maqam named Maqam Hajja Amirah, accompanied by a mosque, once stood in the graveyard atop a nearby flat hill. Today, only remnants of it exist as a ruin on a slope adjacent to the asphalt street. According to local accounts, it was demolished in recent years to accommodate the expansion of the graveyard.

=== Ottoman era ===
In 1596, during the Ottoman Empire, Rajeb (under the name of Rajib Rayan) was noted in the census as being located in the nahiya of Ajloun in the liwa of Ajloun. It had a population of 8 households and 2 bachelors, all Muslim. They paid a fixed tax-rate of 25% on various agricultural products, including wheat (1400 a.), barley (1600 a.), summer crops (1600 a.) olive trees (800 a.), goats and beehives (400 a.), in addition to "occasional revenues" (320 a.) and for an olive oil press/press for grape syrup (80 a.); a total of 4,500 akçe.

=== Modern era ===
The Jordanian census of 1961 found 645 inhabitants in Rajib.

== Waterfall ==
The Rajeb Waterfall attracts thousands of visitors annually.

== Bibliography ==
- Government of Jordan, Department of Statistics (1964). First Census of Population and Housing. Volume I: Final Tables; General Characteristics of the Population (PDF).
- Hütteroth, W.-D.; Abdulfattah, K. (1977). Historical Geography of Palestine, Transjordan and Southern Syria in the Late 16th Century. Erlanger Geographische Arbeiten, Sonderband 5. Erlangen, Germany: Vorstand der Fränkischen Geographischen Gesellschaft. ISBN 3-920405-41-2.
