= Abilene (ancient) =

Abilene (Ancient Greek: Ἀβιληνή) or simply Abila (Ancient Greek: Ἄβιλα) was a plain, a district in Coele-Syria, of which the chief town was Abila Lysaniou (Ἄβιλα Λυσανίου). The limits of this region are nowhere exactly defined, but it seems to have included the eastern slopes of the Anti-Lebanon range, and to have extended south and southeast of Damascus as far as the borders of Galilaea, Batanaea, and Trachonitis. According to Flavius Josephus, Abilene was a separate Iturean kingdom until 37 AD.

== History ==
Abilene, when first mentioned in history, was governed by a certain Ptolemaeus, son of Mennaeus, who was succeeded, about 40 BC, by a son named Lysanias. Lysanias was put to death in 33 BC, at the instigation of Cleopatra, and the principality passed, by a sort of purchase apparently, into the hands of one Zenodorus, from whom it was transferred (31 BC) to Herod the Great. At the death of the latter (4 BC) one portion of it was annexed to the tetrarchy of his son Philip, and the remainder bestowed upon that Lysanias who is named by Luke (Luke 3).

Immediately after the death of Tiberius (37 AD), Caligula made over to Herod Agrippa, at that time a prisoner in Rome, the tetrarchy of Philip and the tetrarchy of Lysanias, while Claudius, upon his accession (41), not only confirmed the liberality of his predecessor towards Herod Agrippa, but added all that portion of Judaea and Samaria which had belonged to the kingdom of his grandfather Herod the Great, together (says Josephus) with Abila, which had appertained to Lysanias, and the adjoining region of Libanus. Lastly, in 53, Claudius granted to Herod Agrippa II the tetrarchy of Philip with Batanaea and Trachonitis and Abila (Joseph. Ant. xiv. 4. § 4, 7. § 4, xviii. 7. § 10, xix. 5. § 1, xx. 6. § 1, B. J. i. 13. § 1, xx. 4.)

Josephus, at first sight, seems to contradict himself, in so far that in one passage (Ant. xviii. 7. § 10) he represents Caligula as bestowing upon Herod Agrippa the tetrarchy of Lysanias, while in another (Ant. xix. 5. § 1) he states that Abila Lysaniou was added by Claudius to the former dominions of Agrippa, but, in reality, these expressions must be explained as referring to the division of Abilene which took place on the death of Herod the Great. Abila is mentioned among the places captured by Placidus, one of Vespasian's generals, in 69 or 70 (Joseph. B. J. iv. 7. § 5), and from that time forward, it was permanently annexed to the province of Syria.

== Biblical reference ==
In chapter 3 of the Gospel of Luke, the timeframe when John the Baptist began to preach his baptism of repentance in the wilderness is indicated by noting which rulers were ruling in certain areas:

1 Now in the fifteenth year of the reign of Tiberius Cæsar, Pontius Pilate being governor of Judæa, and Herod being tetrarch of Galilee, and his brother Philip tetrarch of Ituræa and of the region of Trachonitis, and Lysanias the tetrarch of Abilene,
2 Annas and Caiaphas being the high priests, the word of God came unto John the son of Zacharias in the wilderness.

== See also ==
- Abila (Decapolis), a similarly named Classical city
