= Zenodorus =

Zenodorus may refer to

- Zenodorus (spider), a genus of spiders
- Zenodorus son of Lysanias, King and ruler of Iturea
- Zenodorus (mathematician), ancient Greek mathematician
- Zenodorus (sculptor), builder of the Colossus of Nero in Rome
