= Leucas (disambiguation) =

Leucas is a genus of plants in the family Lamiaceae.

Leucas may also refer to an English transliteration of the ancient Greek place name Leukas (Λευκάς) and places bearing that name:

- Lefkada or Lefkas, Greece
- Abila Lysaniou, also Leucas, ancient city of Syria
