= Omrit =

Temple at Omrit
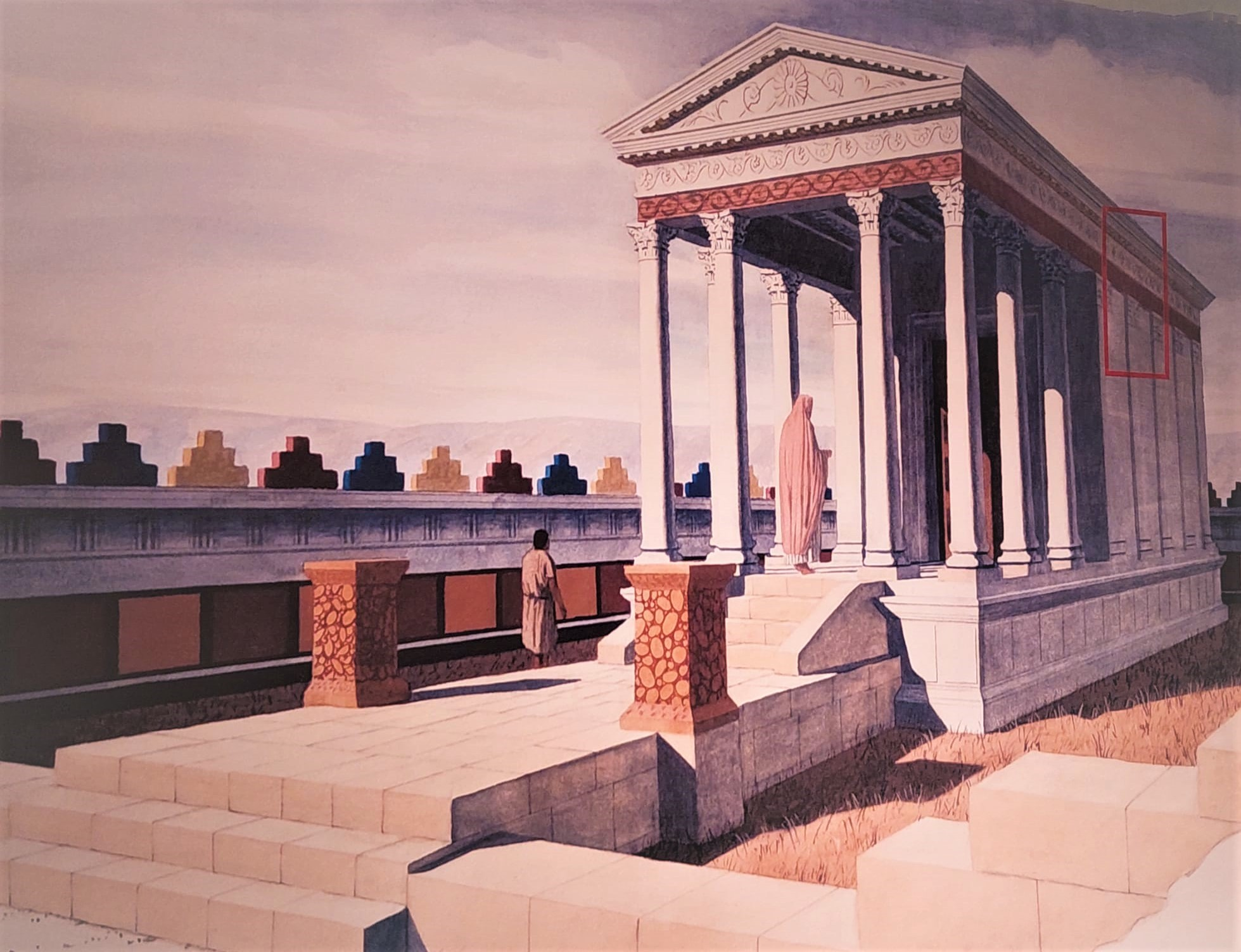
- Reconstruction model of the Roman temple at the Israel Museum

- Location within Levant
- 33°13′06″N 35°39′47″E
- Type: Archaeological site / Roman temple
- Periods: Antiquity, Late antiquity
- Cultures: Hellenistic, Roman, Byzantine
- Satellite of: Herodian Kingdom of Judea, Roman Empire
- Associated with: Romans, Byzantines
- Location: Hula Valley / Golan Heights foothills
- Region: Northern District

History
- Built: c. 20 B.C. (First Roman phase)
- Built by: Herod the Great (attributed)
- Abandoned: 363 A.D. (destroyed by the Galilee earthquake)

Site notes
- Material: Limestone, plaster
- Height: c. 22 m
- Length: 25.22 m
- Width: 13.16 m
- Excavation dates: Systematic excavations since 1999
- Archaeologists: J. Andrew Overman
- Condition: Ruined
- Owner: State property
- Management: Israel Nature and Parks Authority
- Public access: Yes

Omrit (Hebrew: חורבת עומרית, romanized: Horvat Omrit), or Khirbat ‘Umayrī (Arabic name), is the site of an ancient Roman temple. It stands where the western slopes of the Golan Heights meet the Upper Jordan Valley, in the 1949 Israel–Syria demilitarised zone, not far from Banias.

It is believed that Omrit was built by Herod the Great in honor of Augustus around 20 BCE. The site was destroyed in the Galilee earthquake of 363; a small chapel was later built on its ruins in the Byzantine period.

== History ==
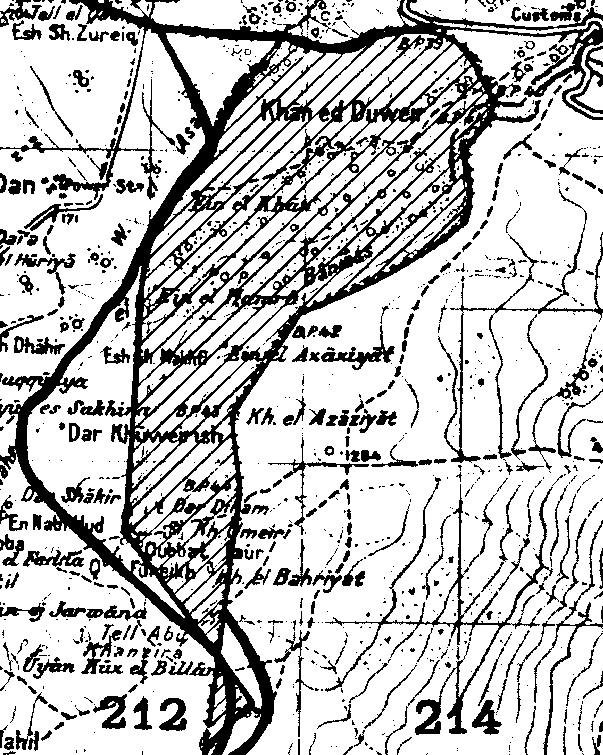
Omrit ("Kh. Umeiri"), shown at the southern end of the Khan al-Duwayr Demilitarized Zone, part of the wider Israel–Syria demilitarised zone.

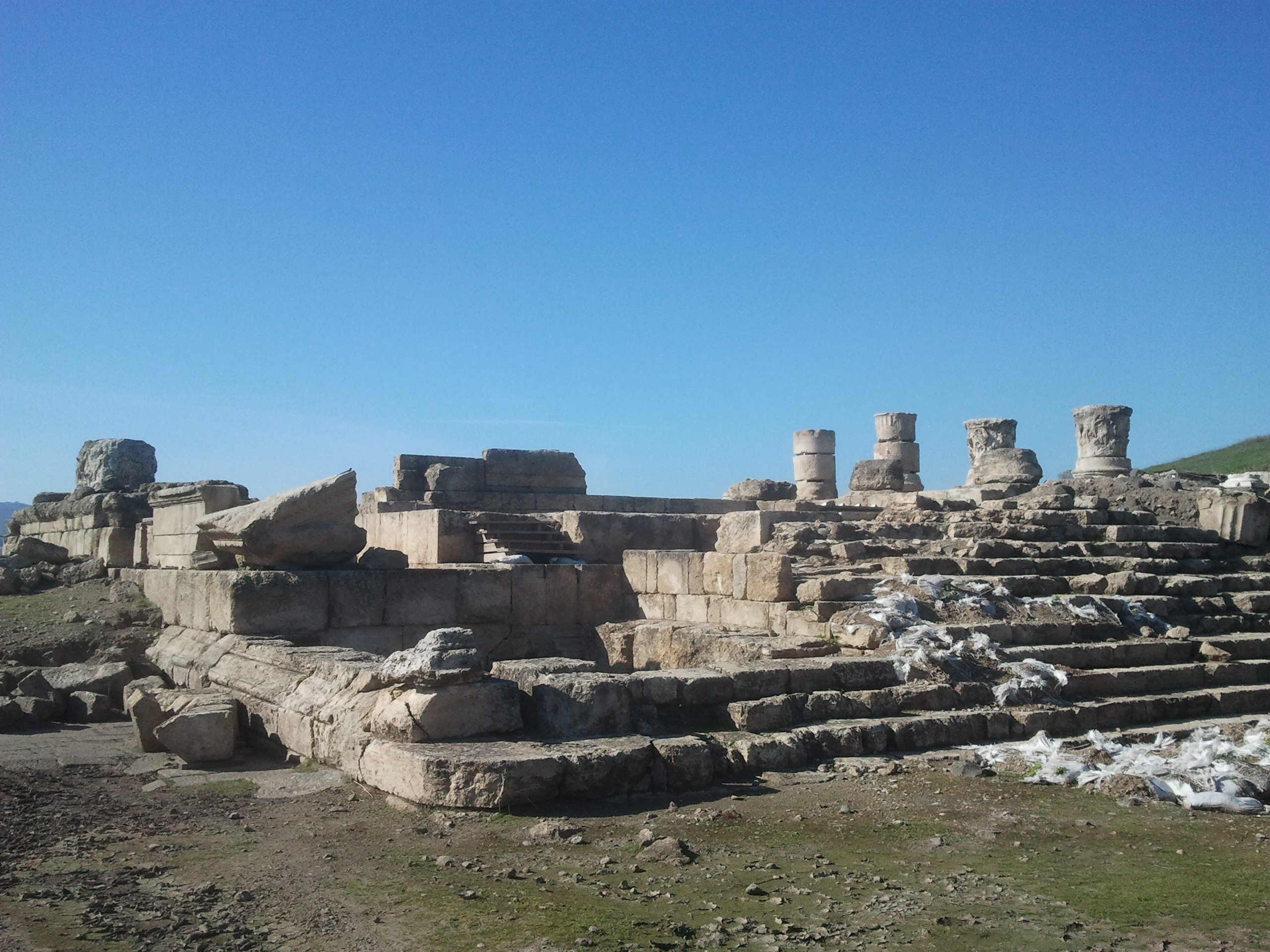
The temple

Omrit is situated atop a foothill of Mount Hermon, overlooking Hula Lake. The site is located approximately 2.5 miles (c. 4 km) southwest of Banias, adjacent to a Roman road connecting Scythopolis and Damascus.

According to the first-century historian Josephus, in addition to reconstructing he Second Temple in Jerusalem, Herod built another three temples: one in Caesarea Maritima, one in Sebastia, and one near Banias. Given Omrit's proximity to Banias and the presence of an ancient temple adorned with Corinthian capitals, it is very likely that Omrit is the site of the fourth temple built by Herod.

After a brushfire cleared the area in 1998, archaeological excavations began, being led by Professor Andrew J. Overman of Macalester College, with the assistance of nearby Kfar Szold. The region was well trodden by Roman influence, and thus far excavations have yielded three phases of temple construction approximated at mid 1st century BCE, 20 BCE and 1st century CE. The temple compound, in the center of the hill, was connected to the road by way of a street lined with columns, as was customary in the eastern provinces of the Roman Empire. It continued to be used into the Byzantine period. The remains of shops and installations such as a wine press, were discovered there.

== Gallery ==
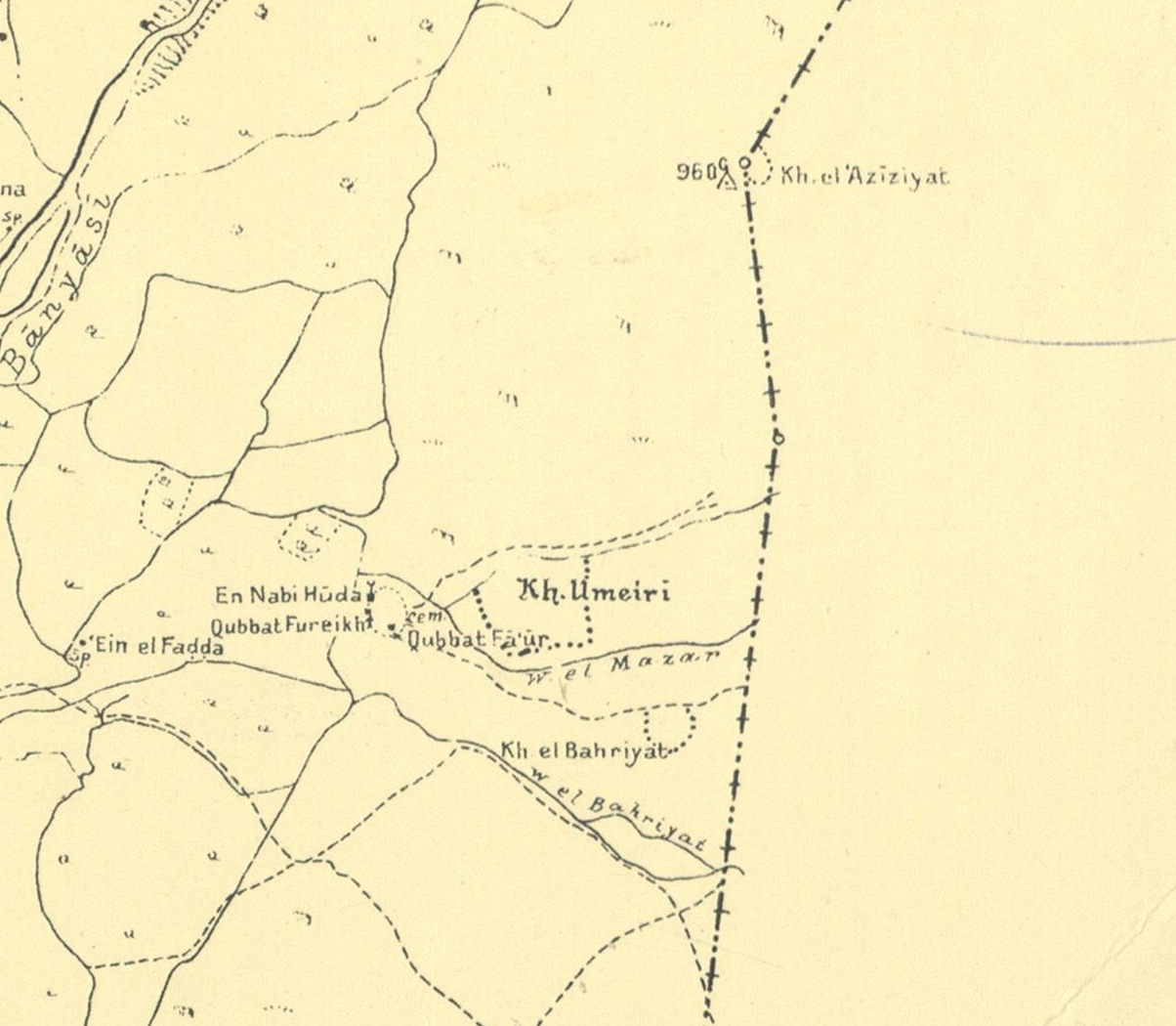
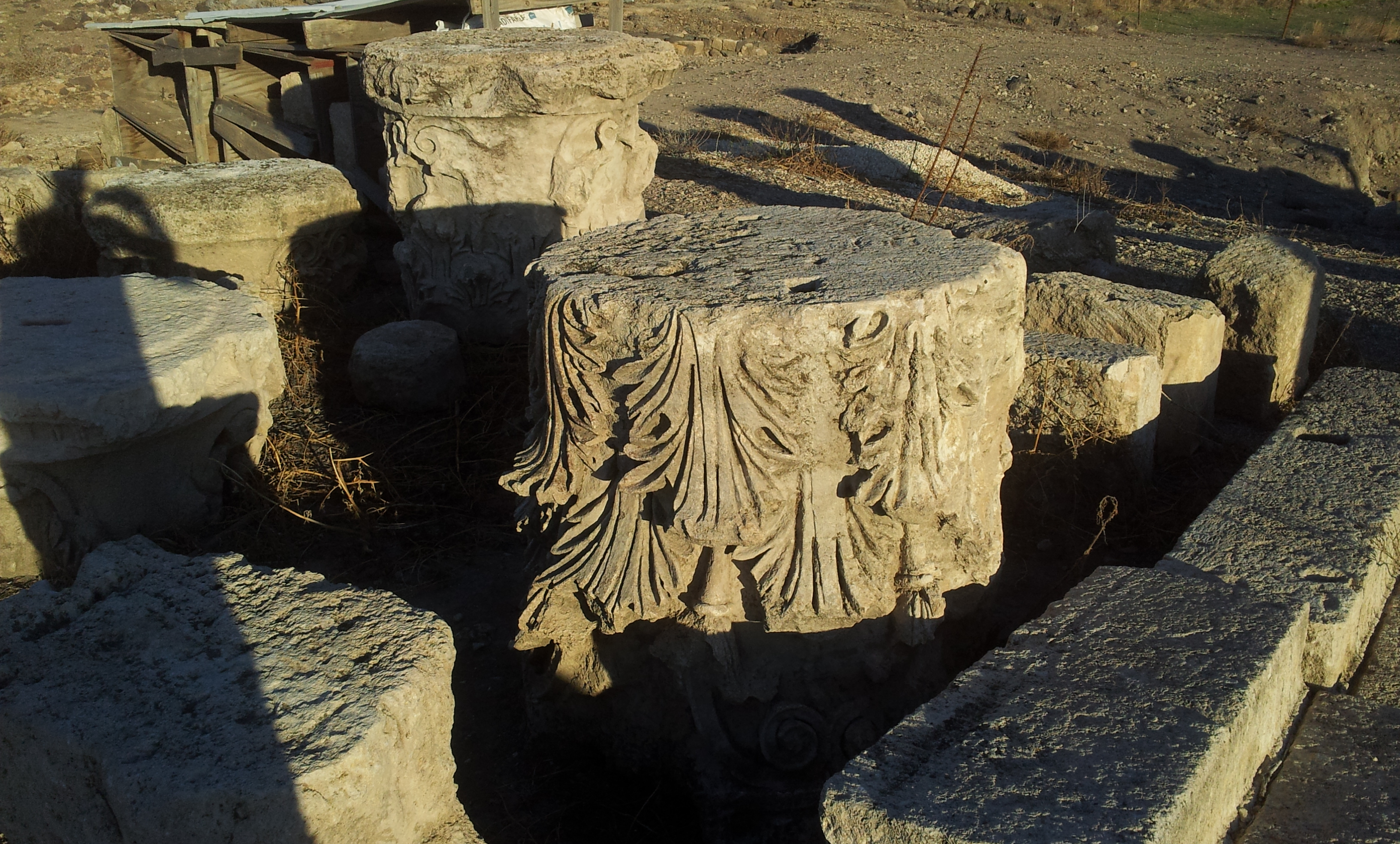
Corinthian column at Omrit
Khirbet Umeiri (today known as Omrit), alongside Nabi Huda and Khirbet el Aziziyat, in a 1930s Survey of Palestine map

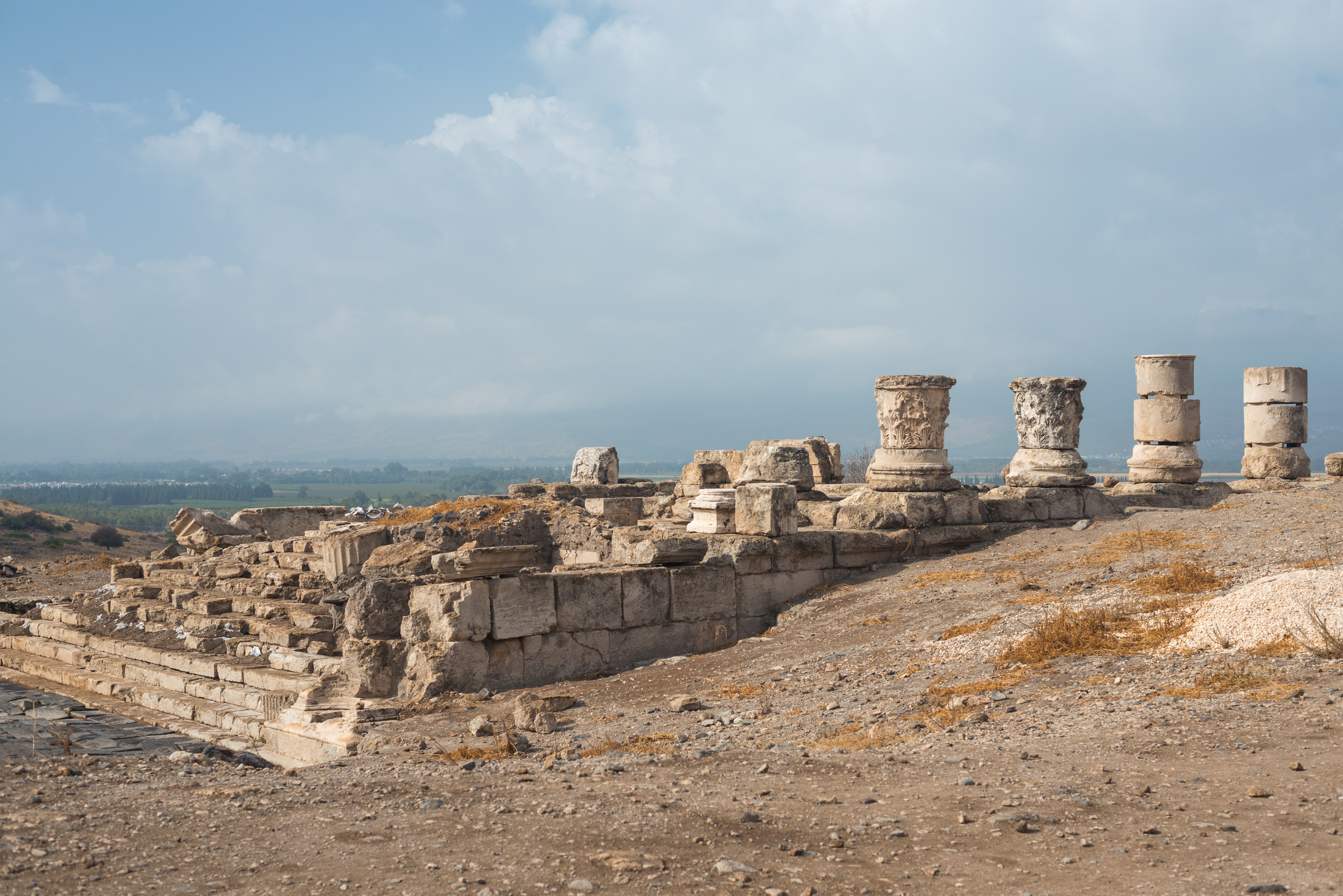
Horvat Omrit

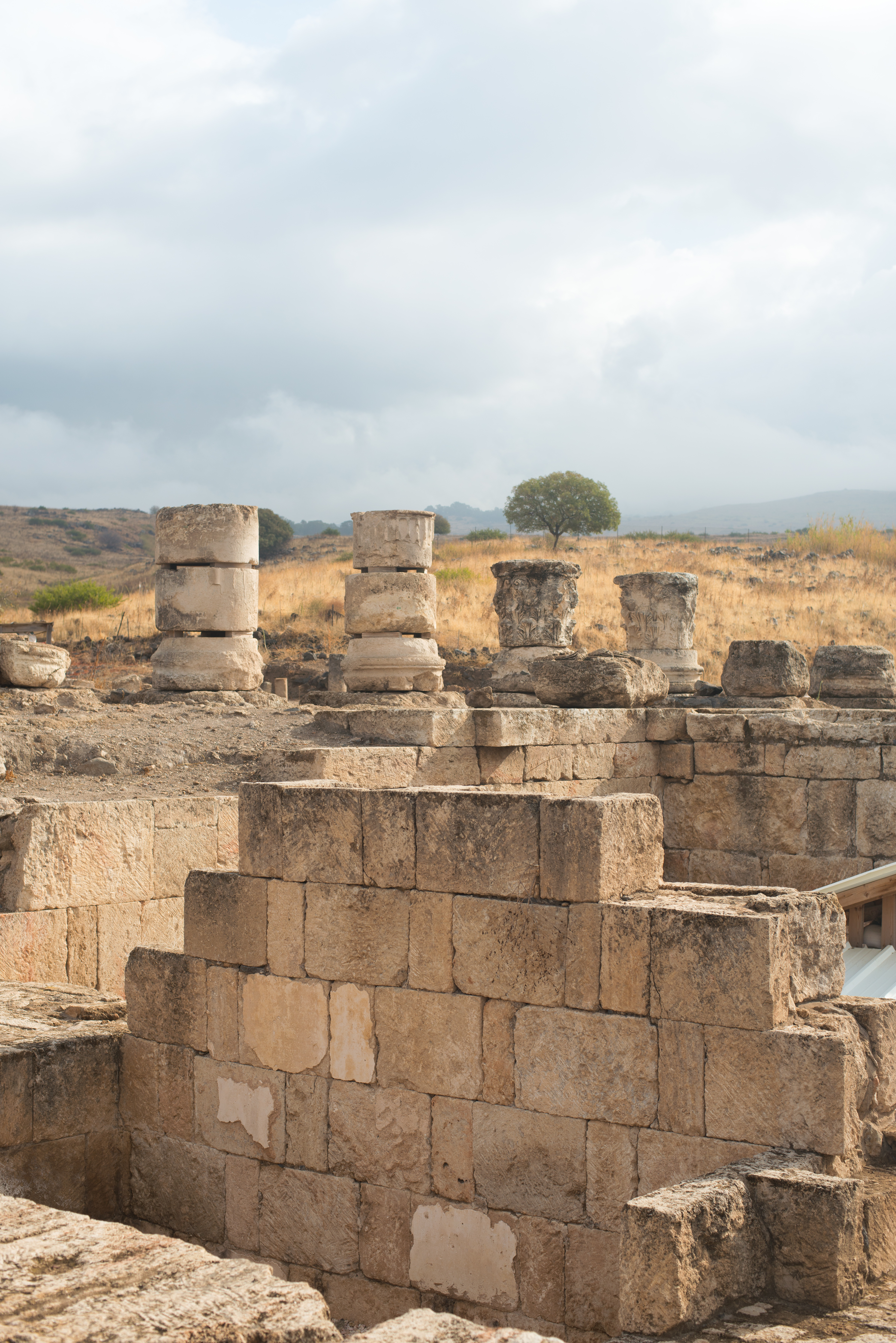
Horvat Omrit

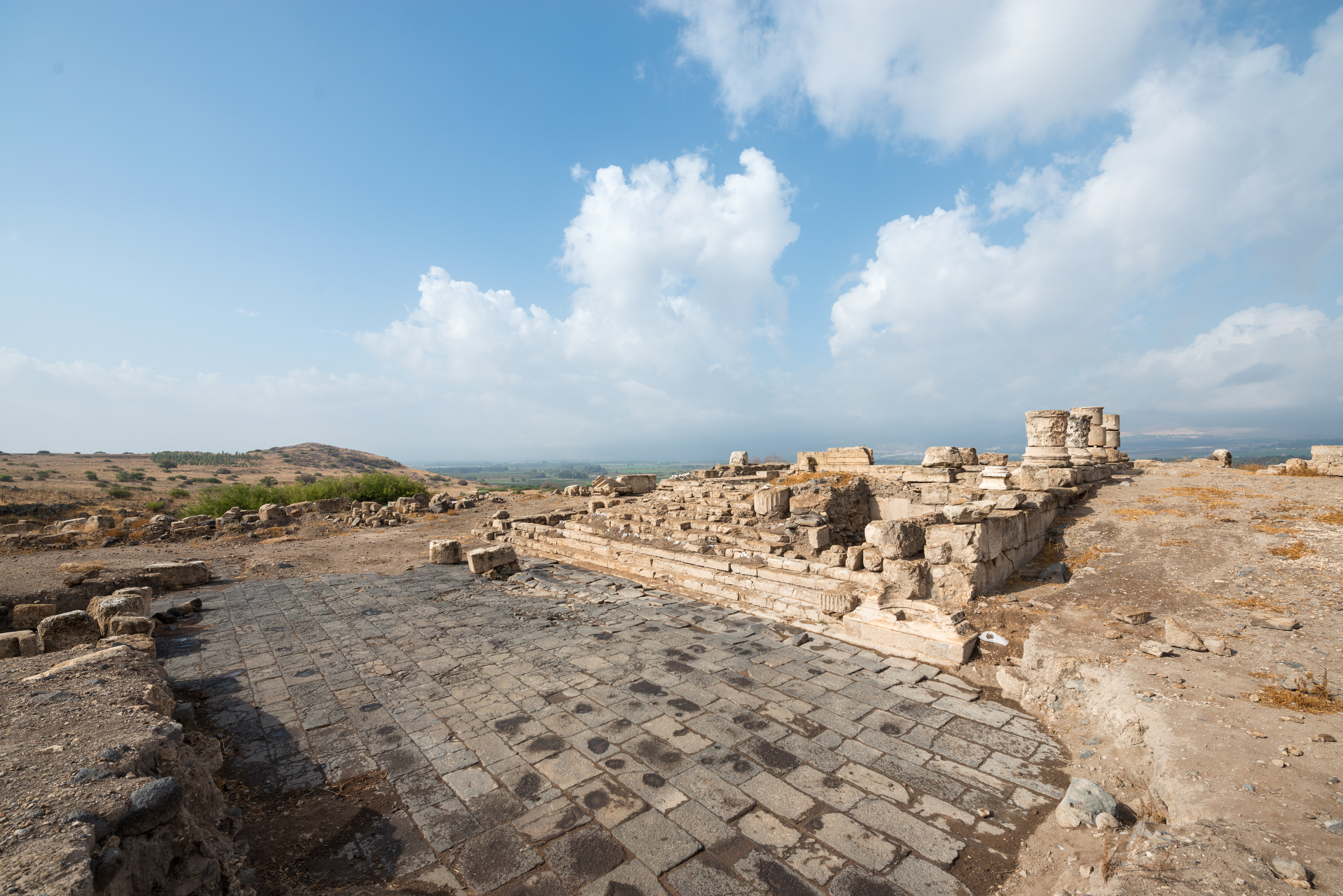
Horvat Omrit's courtyard

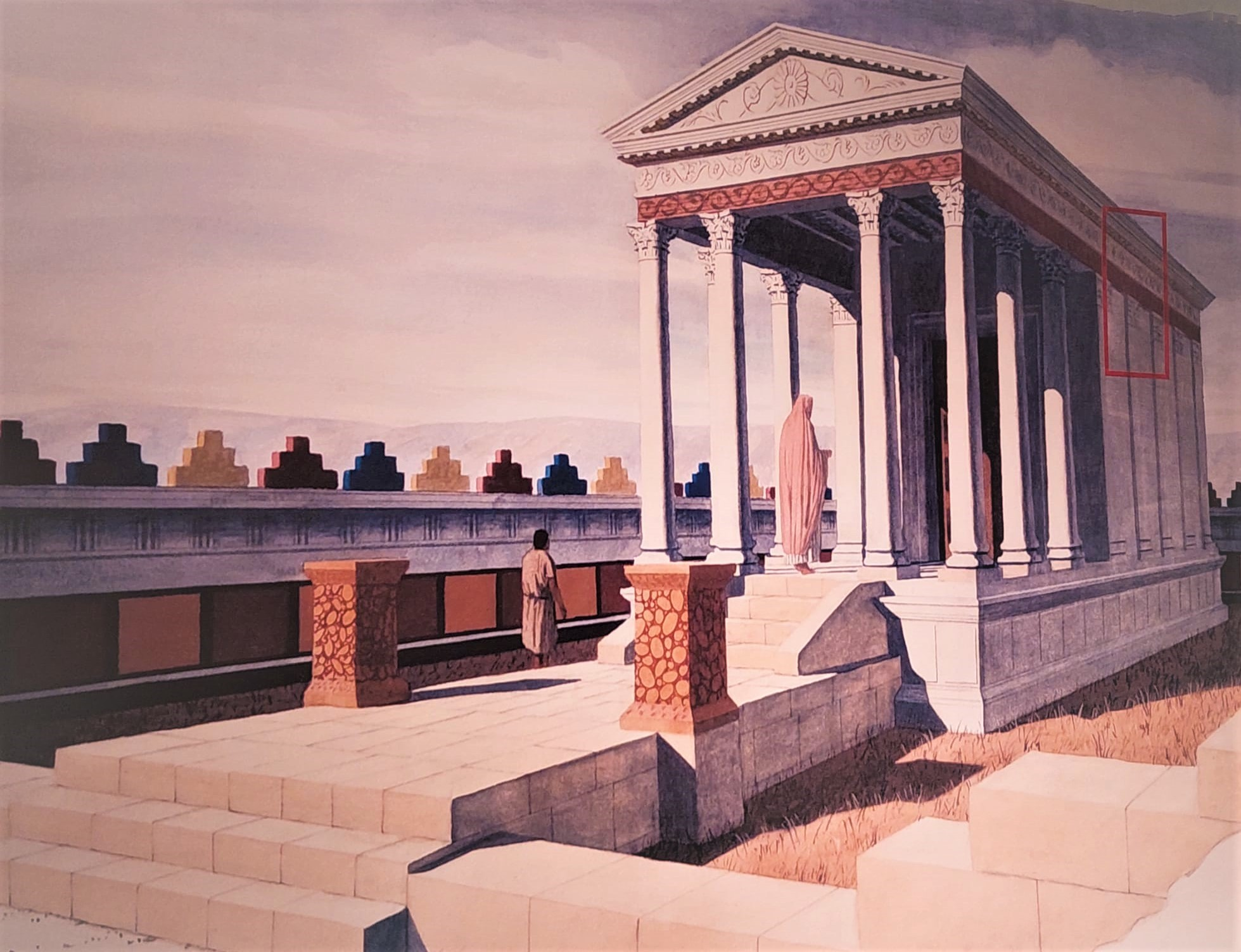
Modern reconstruction of the temple in Omrit, Israel Museum

== See also ==
- Herodian architecture
- Archaeology of Israel

== Bibliography ==
- J. Andrew Overman, Daniel N. Schowalter (eds.): The Roman Temple Complex at Horvat Omrit: An Interim Report. BAR International Series vol. 2205. Oxford: Archaeopress 2011. 978-1-4073-0763-3
- Michael C. Nelson (ed.): The Temple Complex at Horvat Omrit 1: The Architecture. The Brill Reference Library of Judaism vol. 45. Leiden/Boston: Brill 2015. ISBN 978-900425063-5
