= Abila Lysaniou =

Ancient city in Syria

- Ἄβιλα ἐπικαλουμένη Λυσανίου (Ancient Greek); Ἄβιλα (Ancient Greek)
- Location within Syria
- 33.626667°N 36.105833°E
- Location: Syria
- Region: Rif Dimashq Governorate

Abila Lysaniou or Abila Lysaniae or Abila (Ancient Greek: Ἄβιλα ἐπικαλουμένη Λυσανίου or Ἄβιλα) was an ancient city, on the Abana River and capital of ancient Abilene, Coele-Syria.

== Location ==
The site contains ruins of a temple, aqueducts, and other remains, and inscriptions, on the banks of the river. Though the names Abel and Abila differ in derivation and in meaning, their similarity has given rise to the tradition that this was the place of Abel's burial. The city is mentioned in the New Testament (Luke 3:1). According to Josephus, Abilene was a separate Iturean kingdom until AD 37, when it was granted by Caligula to Agrippa I; in 52 Claudius granted it to Agrippa II.

The site is currently that of the village of Souq Wadi Barada (called Abil-es-Suk by early Arab geographers), circa 20 km (12 mi) northwest of Damascus, Syria. It has also been identified by some as the village of Abil just south of Homs in central Syria. The city's surname is derived from Lysanias, a governor of the region. William Smith cites a dissertation in the Transactions of the Academy of Belles Lettres showing that this Abila is the same with Leucas on the river Chrysorrhoas, which at one period assumed the name of Claudiopolis, as shown by some coins described by Joseph Hilarius Eckhel.

== Bishopric ==
Abila Lysaniae, which was in the Roman province of Phoenicia Secunda, was also a Christian bishopric. The Coptic version of the acts of the First Council of Nicaea includes a Heliconius of this see among the participants. Iordanus was at the 445 Council of Antioch and at the Council of Chalcedon of 451. John was one of the signatories of a joint letter that the bishops of Phoenicia Secunda sent in 458 to Byzantine Emperor Leo I the Thracian to protest at the killing of Proterius of Alexandria. Alexander was deposed by Emperor Justin I in 518 for his Syriac Orthodox tendencies.

No longer a residential diocese, it is today listed by the Catholic Church as a titular see.

== "Abila" in Old French literature ==
Abila, also written as "Abilant" or "Abelant", appears as a castle or city, a character from that place (a princess, king, sultan, as in Rouge-Lion d'Abilant) or even a Saracen's formal name, in The Jerusalem Continuations: The London and Turin Redactions of the Old French Crusade cycle, Simon de Puille: Chanson de geste, Karlamagnús saga: The Saga of Charlemagne and His Heroes, and Gloriant.

== See also ==
- List of Catholic titular sees
