= Lysanias =

Ruler mentioned in Josephus

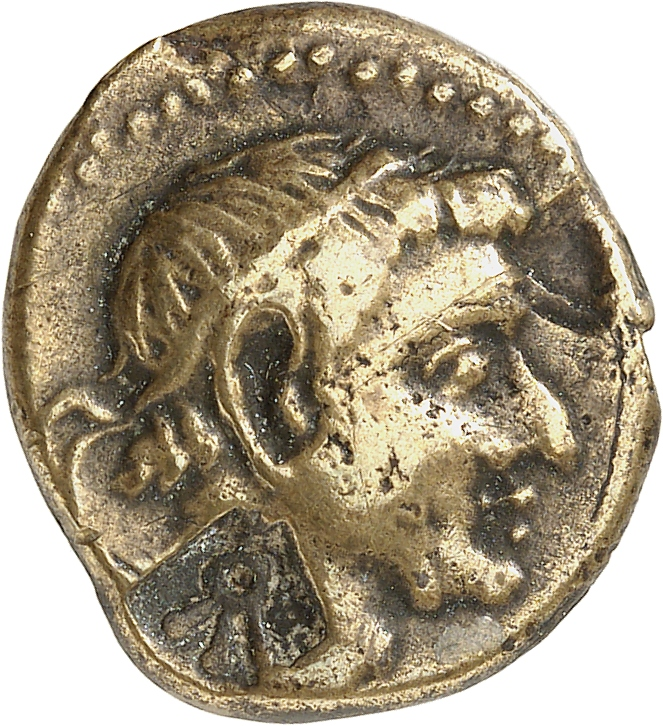
- Portrait of Lysanias on the obverse of a coin, printed c. 40 BCE–36 BCE, held in the Münzkabinett Berlin
- Reign: 40 – 36 BCE
- Predecessor: Ptolemy (son of Mennaeus)
- Died: 33 BCE
- Father: Ptolemy (son of Mennaeus)

Lysanias /laɪˈseɪniəs/ was the ruler of a small realm on the western slopes of Mount Hermon, mentioned by the Jewish historian Josephus and in coins from c. 40 BC. There is also mention of a Lysanias in Luke's Gospel.

== Lysanias in Josephus ==
Lysanias was the ruler of a tetrarchy, centered on the town of Abila. This has been referred to by various names including Abilene, Chalcis and Iturea, from about 40-36 BC. Josephus is our main source for his life.

The father of Lysanias was Ptolemy, son of Mennaeus, who ruled the tetrarchy before him. Ptolemy was married to Alexandra, one of the sisters of Antigonus, and he helped his brother-in-law during the latter's successful attempt to claim the throne of Judea in 40 BC with the military support of the Parthians. Ptolemy had previously supported Antigonus's unsuccessful attempt to take the throne of Judea in 42 BC.

Josephus says in The Jewish War that Lysanias offered the Parthian satrap Barzapharnes a thousand talents and 500 women to bring Antigonus back and raise him to the throne, after deposing Hyrcanus though in his later work, the Jewish Antiquities, he says the offer was made by Antigonus. In 33 BC Lysanias was put to death by Mark Antony for his Parthian sympathies, at the instigation of Cleopatra, who had eyes on his territories.

Coins from his reign indicate that he was "tetrarch and high priest". The same description can be found on the coins of his father, Ptolemy son of Mennaeus and on those of his son Zenodorus who held the territory in 23–20 BC.

== Lysanias in Luke ==
Luke 3:1 mentions a Lysanias (Greek: Λυσανίας) as tetrarch of Abilene in the time of John the Baptist. Schürer affirms the accuracy of Luke’s claim.

According to Josephus the emperor Claudius in 42 AD confirmed Agrippa I in the possession of Abila of Lysanias already bestowed upon him by Caligula, elsewhere described as Abila, which had formed the tetrarchy of Lysanias:

"He added to it the kingdom of Lysanias, and that province of Abilene"

== Archaeological Lysanias ==
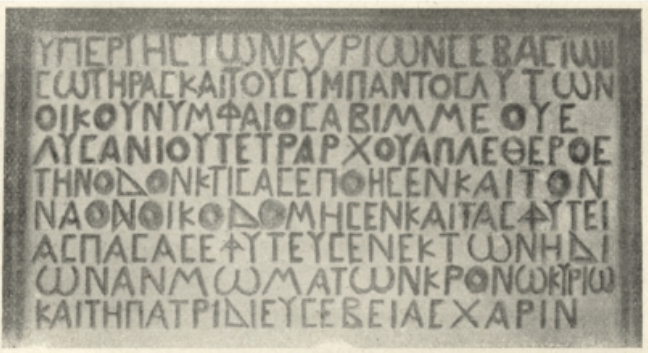
Greek inscription mentioning Lysanias, the tetrarch. Discovered in Syria 18 miles from Damascus.

Two inscriptions have been ascribed to Lysanias, The name is conjectural in the latter case. The first, a temple inscription found at Abila, named Lysanias as the Tetrarch of the locality. The second one is inscribed in a mountain near Souq Wadi Barada.

The temple inscription reads:

Transcription (Dittenberger)	Translation (Braund)
Ὑπὲρ (τ)ῆ(ς) τῶν κυρίων Σε[βαστῶν]	For the safety of the lords Au[gusti]
σωτηρίας καὶ τοῦ σύμ[παντος]	and their [whole] house;
αὐτῶν οἴκου Νύμφαιος Ἀέ[του],	Nymphaeus, free[dman] of
Λυσανίου τετράρχου ἀπελε[ύθερος]	Lysanias the tetrarch,
τὴν ὁδὸν κτίσας ἄστε[ι]π[τ]ο[ν οὖσαν καὶ]	who built the road where there was none and
τὸν ναὸν οἰκο[δομ]ή[σας τὰς περὶ αὐτὸν]	[erected] the temple and
φυτείας πάσας ἐφύ[τευσεν ἐκτ]	planted all the [orchards around it]
ῶν ἰδίων ἀναλ[ωμάτων θεῷ]	at his own [expense for]
Κρόνῳ κυρίῳ κα[ὶ —————-	divine Cronus, lord, [and]
————-] Εὐσεβία γυνή.	Eusebia, his wife.

Savignac argues that these inscriptions had corroborated the existence of a younger Lysanias because of the phrase the lords Augusti. Aggripina and Nero couldn't be the rulers at the time since the tetrarchy went extinct in 37 AD. It can be concluded that the inscription refers to Livia and Tiberius. Nymphaeus, the freedman, would not be old enough to remember the older Lysanias, ruler of the Itureans. This would mean that the inscription refers to a sovereign ruler or a person who recently died, just like the one mentioned by St. Luke's gospel.

Although, Renan argued that there would be a gap of at least forty-eight years between Nymphaeus's manumission and the erection of the monument and that it would be improbable to recollect a circumstance that was only significant to Lysanias, son of Ptolemy, and it is likely to be someone related to him.

== Possible identity of the two figures ==
The reference to Lysanias in Luke 3:1, dated to the fifteenth year of Tiberius, has caused some debate over whether this Lysanias is the same person son of Ptolemy, or some different person.

Some say that the Lysanias whose tetrarchy was given to Agrippa cannot be the Lysanias executed by Antony, since his paternal inheritance, even allowing for some curtailment by Pompey, must have been of far greater extent. Therefore, the Lysanias in Luke (28–29) is a younger Lysanias, tetrarch of Abilene only, one of the districts into which the original kingdom was split up after the death of Lysanias I. This younger Lysanias may have been a son of the latter, and identical with, or the father of, the Claudian Lysanias.

But Josephus does not refer to a second Lysanias. It is therefore suggested by others that he really does refer to the original Lysanias, even though the latter died decades earlier. In The Jewish War Josephus refers to the realm as being "called the kingdom of Lysanias", while Ptolemy writing c. 120 in his Geography Bk 5 refers to Abila as "called of Lysanias"

The explanation given by M. Krenkel (Josephus und Lucas, Leipzig, 1894, p. 97) is that Josephus does not mean to imply that Abila was the only possession of Lysanias, and that he calls it the tetrarchy or kingdom of Lysanias because it was the last remnant of the domain of Lysanias which remained under direct Roman administration until the time of Agrippa.
