= Ptolemy (son of Mennaeus) =

Ptolemy or Ptolemaeus (Greek: Πτολεμαῖος), son of Mennaeus (Mennæus) was tetrarch of Iturea and Chalcis from about 85 BC to 40 BC, in which year he died.

== Family ==
Ptolemy was the son of Mannaeus and born to [...]. They had a son named Phillipon. Ptolemy married Alexandra (daughter of Aristobulus II of Judea, sister of Antigonus II of Judea) after killing his son Phillipon who first had married her.

== Reign ==
He tried to extend his kingdom by warlike expeditions (Strabo, xvi. 2, § 10); and ruled the Lebanon, threatened Damascus, subjugated several districts on the Phoenician coast, and once had Paneas in his hands (Josephus, Ant. xv. 10, §§ 1–3). In fact, the whole of Galilee had formerly been in the possession of the Itureans, and had been taken away from them in 103 BC by Aristobulus I. (ibid. xiii. 11, § 3).

The Jews thought themselves oppressed by Ptolemy, and hence Aristobulus II, at that time still prince and sent by his mother, Alexandra, undertook an expedition against Damascus to protect it against Ptolemy (ibid. 16, § 3; idem, B. J. i. 5, § 3). Pompey destroyed Ptolemy's strongholds in the Lebanon and doubtless took away from him the Hellenistic cities, as he did in Judaea. When Aristobulus II was murdered by Pompey's party in Judea (49 BC), his sons and daughters found protection with Ptolemy (Ant. xiv. 7, § 4; B. J. i. 9, § 2). It may be that the national Jewish party at that time depended for support on the Itureans in Chalcis, and perhaps the following statement has reference to that fact: "On the 17th of Adar danger threatened the rest of the Soferim in the city of Chalcis, and it was salvation for Israel" (Meg. Ta'an. xii.).

Antigonus II Mattathias, son of Aristobulus, was also supported by Ptolemy in his effort to establish himself as king in Judaea (Ant. xiv. 12, § 1). Josephus says that the Hasmonean king Antigonus was a "kinsman" of Ptolemy. He was married to Antigonus's sister Alexandra, who had previously married Ptolemy's son Philippion. However, Ptolemy slew his son and took his bride for himself.

In 40 BC, Ptolemy died just as the Parthians were invading Judaea (Jewish Wars. xiv. 13, § 3; B. J. i. 13, § 1). He was succeeded by his son Lysanias.

== See also ==
- Wright, N. L. 2013: "Ituraean coinage in context". Numismatic Chronicle 173: 55–71. (available online here)
