= Banias =

Archaeological site in the Golan Heights

- بانياس الحولة (Arabic) בניאס (Hebrew)
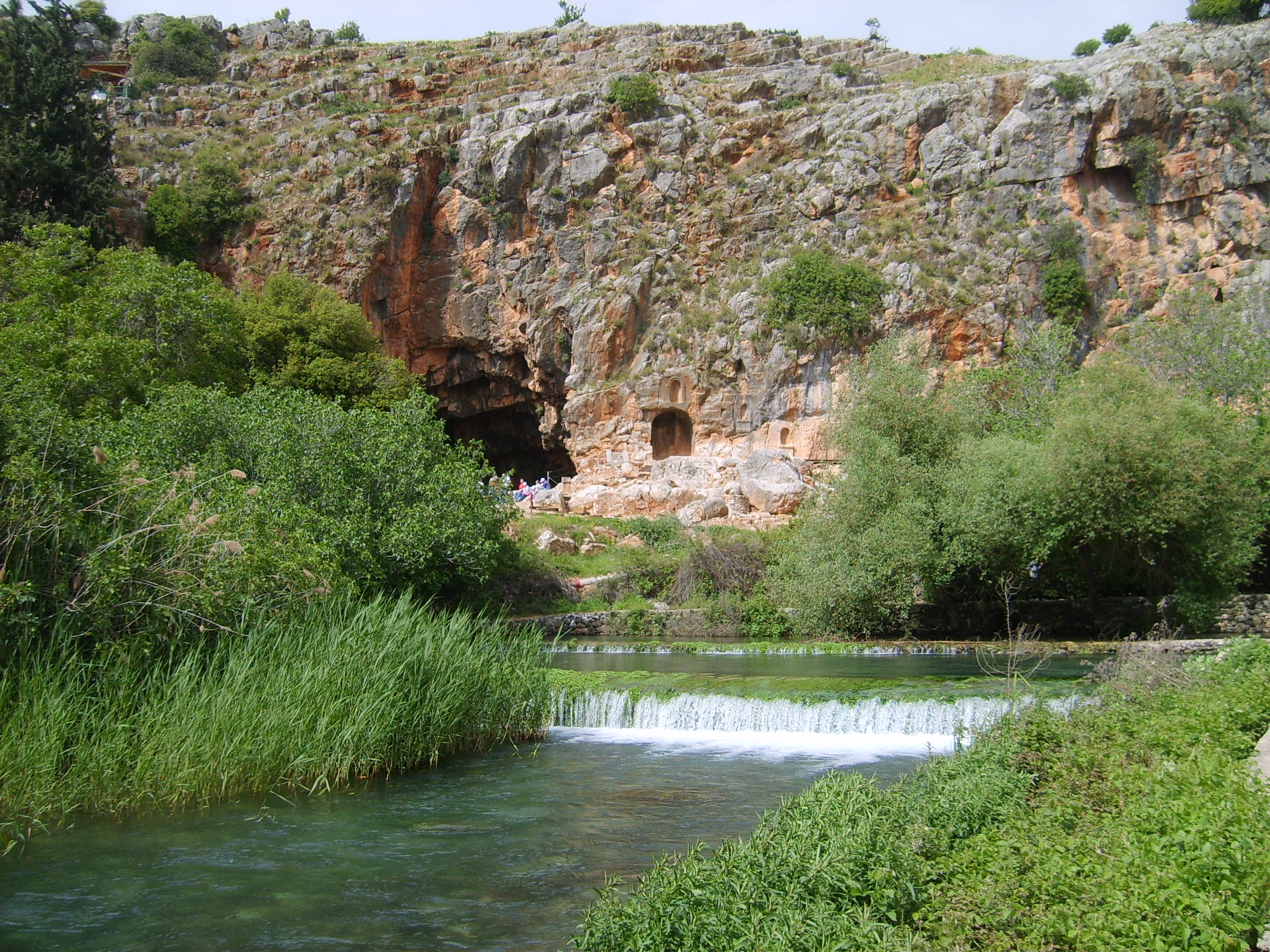
- The spring of Banias with the Cave of Pan in background

- Location within the Golan Heights
- 33°14′55″N 35°41′40″E
- Type: the town of Caesarea Philippi with the sanctuary of Pan
- Cultures: Hellenistic, Roman, Byzantine, Early Islamic, Crusader
- Location: Mount Hermon north of the Golan Heights

Site notes
- Archaeologists: Zvi Maoz (Area A, the temples area) and Vassilios Tzaferis (Area B, the central civic area)
- Public access: yes (national park)

Banias (Arabic: بانياس الحولة, romanized: Bāniyās al-Ḥūlah; Modern Hebrew: בניאס; Judeo-Aramaic, Medieval Hebrew: פמייס, etc.; Ancient Greek: Πανεάς), also spelled Banyas, is a site in the Israeli-occupied Golan Heights, Syria near a natural spring, once associated with the Greek god Pan. It had been inhabited for 2,000 years, until its Syrian population fled and their homes were destroyed by Israel following the 1967 Six-Day War. It is located at the foot of Mount Hermon, north of the Golan Heights, the classical Gaulanitis, in the part occupied by Israel. The spring is the source of the Banias River, one of the main tributaries of the Jordan River. Archaeologists uncovered a shrine dedicated to Pan and related deities, and the remains of an ancient city dating from the Hellenistic and Roman periods.

Herod the Great, king of Judaea, constructed a temple dedicated to Augustus at the site, although nearby Omrit is a strong candidate for being the site of this temple. Subsequently, Herod's son, Philip the Tetrarch, further developed the area, establishing a city. In 61 CE, Agrippa II expanded and renamed the city Neronias Irenopolis. The ancient city was mentioned in the Gospels of Matthew and Mark, under the name of Caesarea Philippi, as the place where Jesus confirmed Peter's confession that Jesus was the Messiah; the site is today a place of pilgrimage for Christians.

The spring at Banias initially originated in a large cave carved out of a sheer cliff face which was gradually lined with a series of shrines. The temenos (sacred precinct) included in its final phase a temple placed at the mouth of the cave, courtyards for rituals, and niches for statues. It was constructed on an elevated, 80m long natural terrace along the cliff which towered over the north of the city. A four-line inscription at the base of one of the niches relates to Pan and Echo, the mountain nymph, and was dated to 87 BCE.

The once very large spring gushed from the limestone cave, but an earthquake moved it to the foot of the natural terrace where it now seeps quietly from the bedrock, with a greatly reduced flow. From here the stream, called Nahal Hermon in Hebrew, flows towards what once were the malaria-infested Hula marshes.

== Etymology ==
The ancient city was first mentioned in the context of the Battle of Panium, fought around 200–198 BCE, when the name of the region was given as the Panion. Later, Pliny called the city Paneas (Ancient Greek: Πανειάς). Both names were derived from that of Pan, the god of the wild and companion of the nymphs. In later Arabic usage the place-name became Bāniyās (بانياس), commonly explained as a phonological adaptation of Greek Paneas in which the initial /p/ shifted to /b/ because /p/ is not native to Arabic phonology. The continuity of the name across periods is reinforced by the site’s long-standing administrative role in the region and by the survival of related local toponymic traditions in later sources.

== History ==
=== Semitic deity of the spring ===
The pre-Hellenistic deity associated with the spring of Banias was variously called Ba'al-gad or Ba'al Hermon.

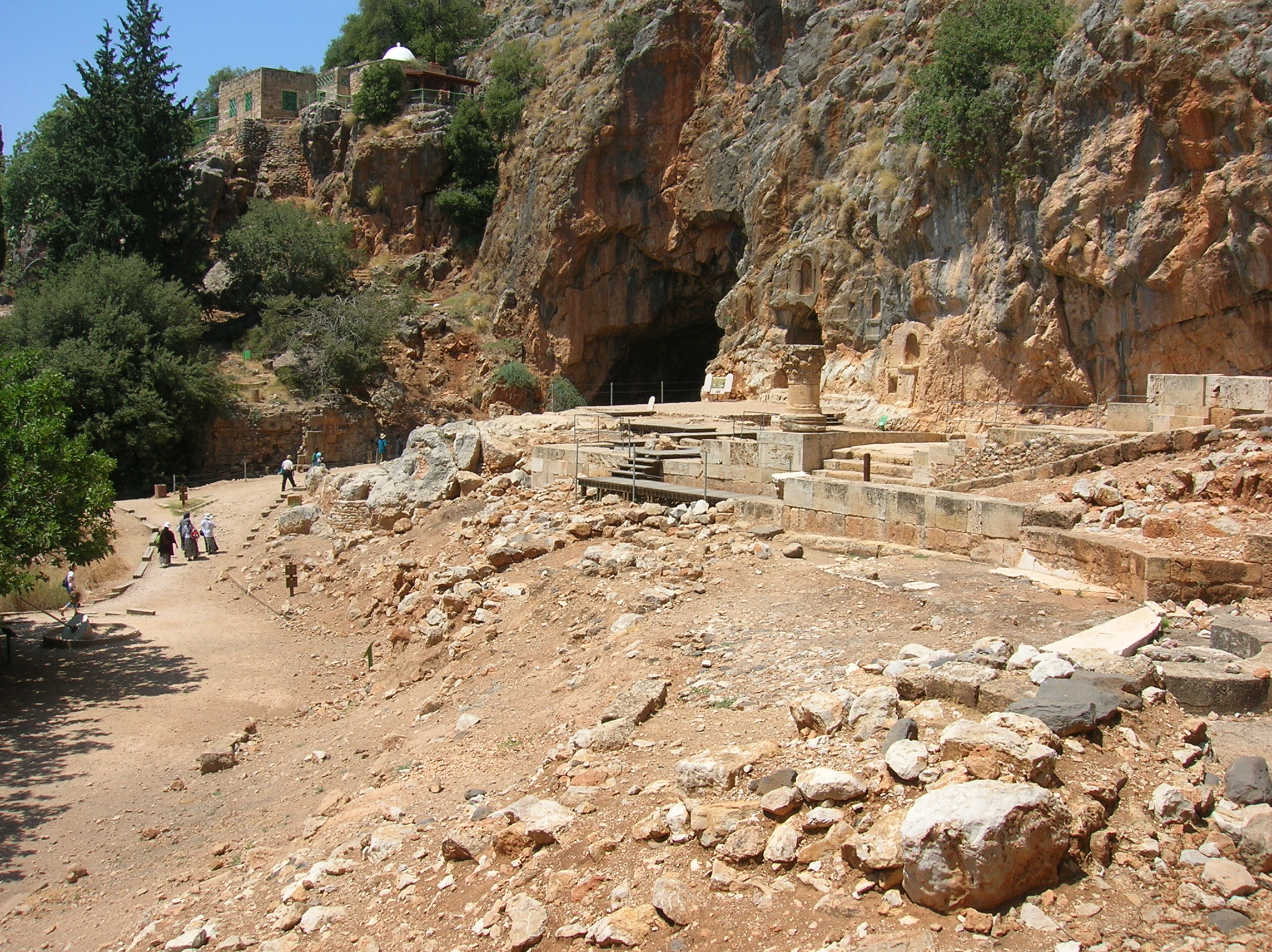
The remnants of the temple of Pan with Pan's grotto. The building with the white dome in the background is the shrine of Nabi Khadr.

=== Hellenism; association with Pan ===
The spring lies close to the 'way of the sea' mentioned by the Book of Isaiah, along which many armies of Antiquity marched. It was certainly an ancient place of great sanctity, and when Hellenised religious influences began to overlay the region, the cult of its local numen gave place to the worship of the Arcadian goat-footed god Pan, to whom the cave was therefore dedicated. Pan was revered by the ancient Greeks as the god of isolated rural areas, music, goat herds, hunting, herding, of sexual and spiritual possession, and of victory in battle, since he was said to instill panic among the enemy.

Paneas (Ancient Greek: Πανεάς, Latin Fanium) was first settled in the Hellenistic period following Alexander the Great's conquest of the east. The Ptolemaic kings built a cult centre there in the 3rd century BCE. In extant sections of the Greek historian Polybius's history of 'The Rise of the Roman Empire', a Battle of Panium is mentioned. This battle was fought in ca. 200–198 BCE between the armies of Ptolemaic Egypt and the Seleucids of Coele-Syria, led by Antiochus III. Antiochus's victory cemented Seleucid control over Phoenicia, Galilee, Samaria, and Judea until the Maccabean revolt. It was these Seleucids who built a pagan temple dedicated to Pan at Paneas.

In 2020, an altar with a Greek inscription was found in the walls of a church of the 7th century A.D. The inscription records that the altar was dedicated by Atheneon, son of Sosipatros, from the city of Antioch to the god Pan Heliopolitanos.

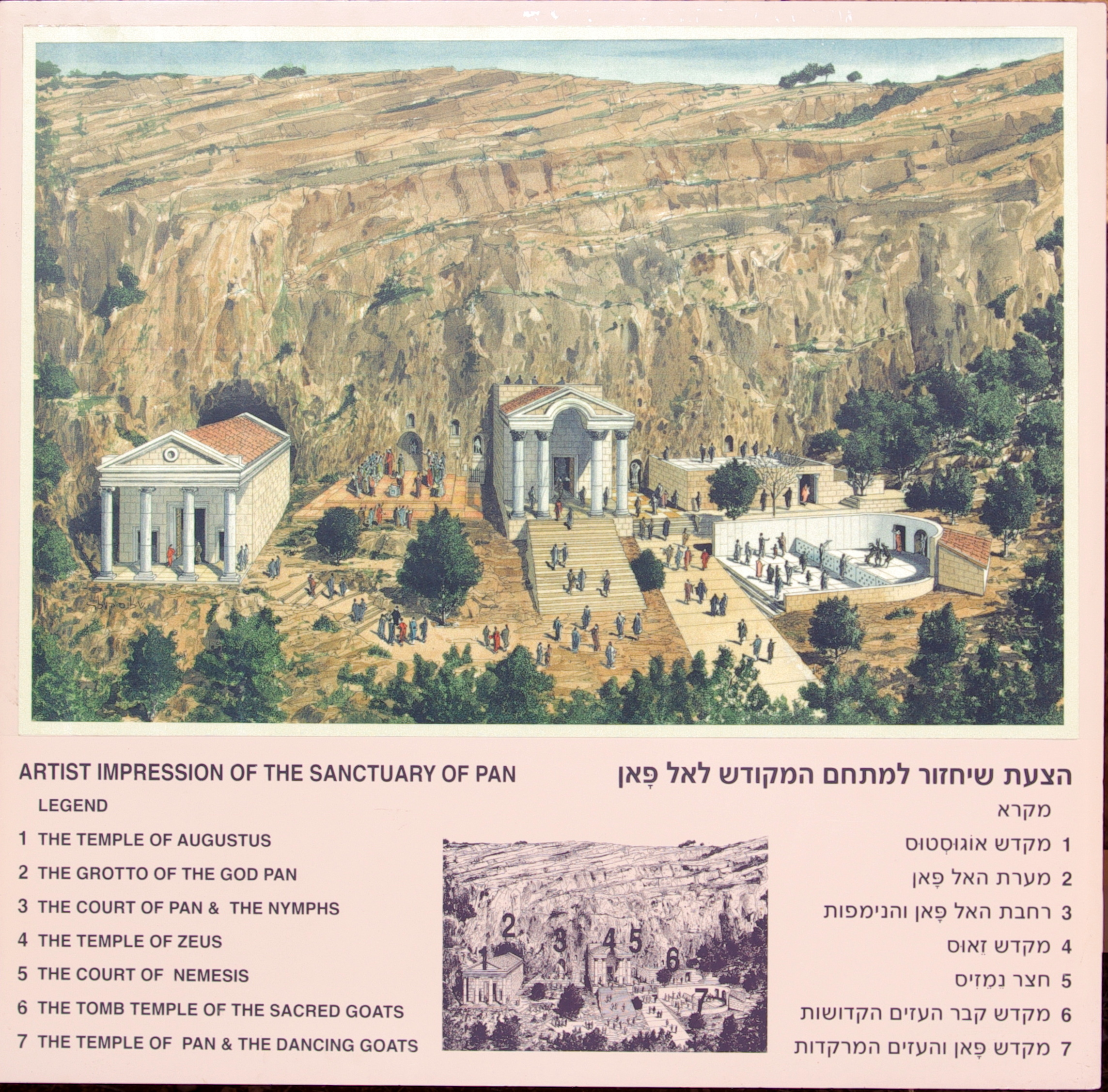
An artist's reconstruction of the Sanctuary of Pan

In 2022, the Israeli Antiquities Authority discovered a trove of 44 pure gold coins from the early 7th Century CE. While some of the coins were minted by the Byzantine-Roman Emperor Phocas (602-610 CE), most date to the reign of his successor, Emperor Heraclius (610-641). The latest of the coins date to the period of the Arab conquest of the Levant.

=== Roman and Christian Byzantine periods ===
Upon Zenodorus's death in 20 BC, the Panion (Greek: Πανιάς), including Paneas, was annexed to the Herodian Kingdom of Judea, a client of the Roman Republic and Roman Empire. Josephus mentions that Herod the Great erected a temple of 'white marble' nearby in honor of his patron; it was found in the nearby site of Omrit.

In 3 BCE, Herod's son, Philip (also known as Philip the Tetrarch) founded a city which became his administrative capital, known from Josephus and the Gospels of Matthew and Mark as Caesarea or Caesarea Philippi, to distinguish it from Caesarea Maritima and other cities named Caesarea (Matthew 16, Matthew 16:13, Mark 8, Mark 8:27). On the death of Philip in 34 CE his kingdom was briefly incorporated into the province of Syria, with the city given the autonomy to administer its own revenues, before reverting to his nephew, Herod Agrippa I.

The ancient city is mentioned in the Gospels of Matthew and Mark, under the name of Caesarea Philippi, as the place where Jesus confirmed Peter's assumption that Jesus was the Messiah; the place is today a place of pilgrimage for Christians.

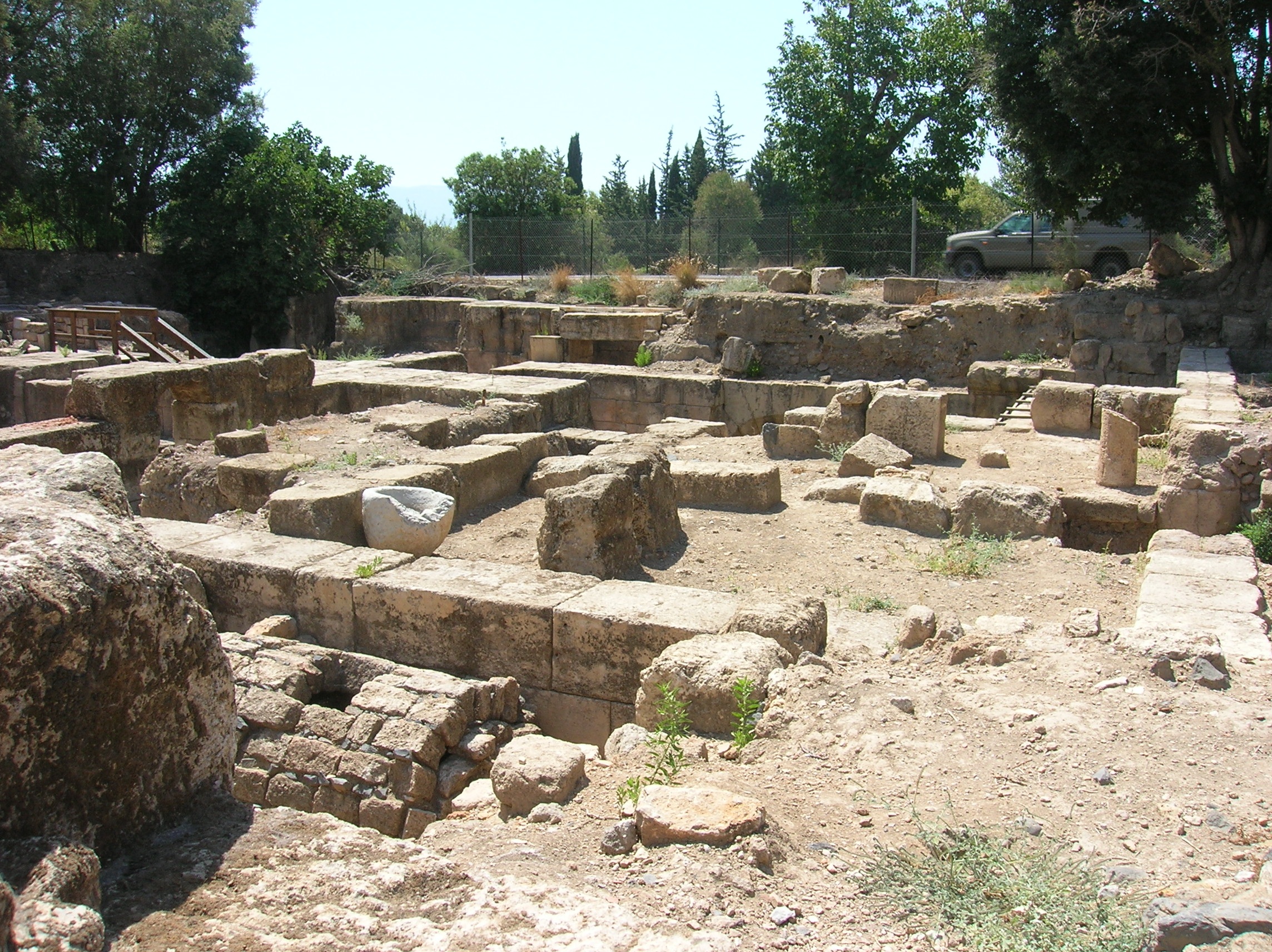
The remains of the palace of Philip and/or Agrippa II

In 61 CE, king Agrippa II renamed the administrative capital Neronias in honor of the Roman emperor Nero, but this name was discarded several years later, in 68 CE. Agrippa also carried out urban improvements. (Note: 'As for Panium itself, its natural beauty had been improved by the royal liberality of Agrippa, and adorned at his expenses.') In 67 CE, during the First Jewish–Roman War, Vespasian briefly visited Caesarea Philippi before advancing on Tiberias in Galilee. With the death of Agrippa II around 92 CE came the end of Herodian rule, and the city returned to the province of Syria.

In the late Roman and Byzantine periods the written sources name the city again as Paneas, or more seldom as Caesarea Paneas. In 361, Emperor Julian the Apostate instigated a religious reformation of the Roman state, in which he supported the restoration of Hellenistic polytheism as the state religion. In Paneas this was achieved by replacing Christian symbols with pagan ones, though the change was short lived.

Following the division of the Empire in the late 4th century, the city became part of the Eastern (later Byzantine) Empire. Archaeological excavations indicate a severe urban decline during the early Byzantine period. Although the precise causes of this decline cannot be determined with certainty and were likely multiple, excessive taxation has been proposed as the explanation that best accords with the available evidence. This interpretation is supported by a passage in the Jerusalem Talmud (yShevi'it 9:2), which states that "Diocletian oppressed the inhabitants of Paneas," prompting threats of mass flight ("we are going"). Scholars have associated this passage with the growing vulnerability of landholders following Diocletian's reforms. Further corroboration comes from epigraphic evidence: an exceptionally dense concentration of Diocletianic boundary stones (inscriptions delineating village territories under the Tetrarchy) has been documented in the hinterland of Paneas.Within the territory of Paneas, 22 of the approximately 40 such stones known from the Levant have been identified, indicating intensive land registration and the presence of numerous privately owned, independently taxed plots. The structure of Diocletian's reforms, which imposed fixed tax assessments and collective fiscal liability on villages, meant that when some landholders abandoned their fields, the resulting tax burden fell disproportionately on those who remained. These conditions are widely regarded as contributing to the city's decline in late antiquity, culminating in what the site's excavator described as "the apparent death of the city" in the early 5th century CE.

=== Early Muslim period ===
The region was lost by the Byzantines to the Arab conquest of the Levant in the 7th century. In 635, Paneas gained favourable terms of surrender from the Muslim army of Khalid ibn al-Walid after it had defeated Heraclius's forces. In 636, a second, newly formed Byzantine army advancing on Palestine used Paneas as a staging post on the way to confront the Muslim army at the final Battle of Yarmouk.

The depopulation of Paneas after the Muslim conquest was rapid, as its traditional markets disappeared. Only 14 of the 173 Byzantine sites in the area show signs of habitation from this period. The Hellenised city thus fell into a precipitous decline. At the council of al-Jabiyah, when the administration of the new territory of the Umar Caliphate was established, Paneas remained the principal city of the district of al-Djawlan (the Djawlan) in the jund (military Province) of Dimashq (Damascus), due to its strategic military importance on the border with Jund al-Urdunn, which comprised the Galilee and territories east and north of it.

Around 780 CE the nun Hugeburc visited Caesarea and reported that the town 'had' a church and a great many Christians, but her account does not clarify whether any of those Christians were still living in the town at the time of her visit.

The transfer of the Abbasid Caliphate capital from Damascus to Baghdad inaugurated the flowering of the Islamic Golden Age at the expense of the provinces. With the decline of Abbasid power in the tenth century, Paneas found itself a provincial backwater in a slowly collapsing empire, as district governors began to exert greater autonomy and used their increasing power to make their positions hereditary. The control of Syria and Paneas passed to the Fatimids of Egypt.

At the end of the 9th century Al-Ya'qubi reaffirms that Paneas was still the capital of al-Djawlan in the jund of Dimshq, although by then the town was known as Madīnat al-Askat (city of the tribes) with its inhabitants being Qays, mostly of the Banu Murra with some Yamani families.

Due to the Byzantine advances under Nicephorus Phocas and John Zimisces into the Abbasid empire, a wave of refugees fled south and augmented the population of Madīnat al-Askat. The city was taken over by an extreme Shī‘ah sect of the Bedouin Qarāmita in 968. In 970 the Fatimids again briefly took control, only to lose it again to the Qarāmita. The old population of Banias along with the new refugees formed a Sunni sufi ascetic community. In 975 the Fatimid al-'Aziz wrested control in an attempt to subdue the anti-Fatimid agitation of Mahammad b. Ahmad al-Nablusi and his followers and to extend Fatimid control into Syria. al-Nabulusi’s school of hadith was to survive in Banias under the tutelage of Arab scholars such as Abú Ishaq (Ibrahim b. Hatim) and al-Balluti.

=== Crusader/Ayyubid period ===
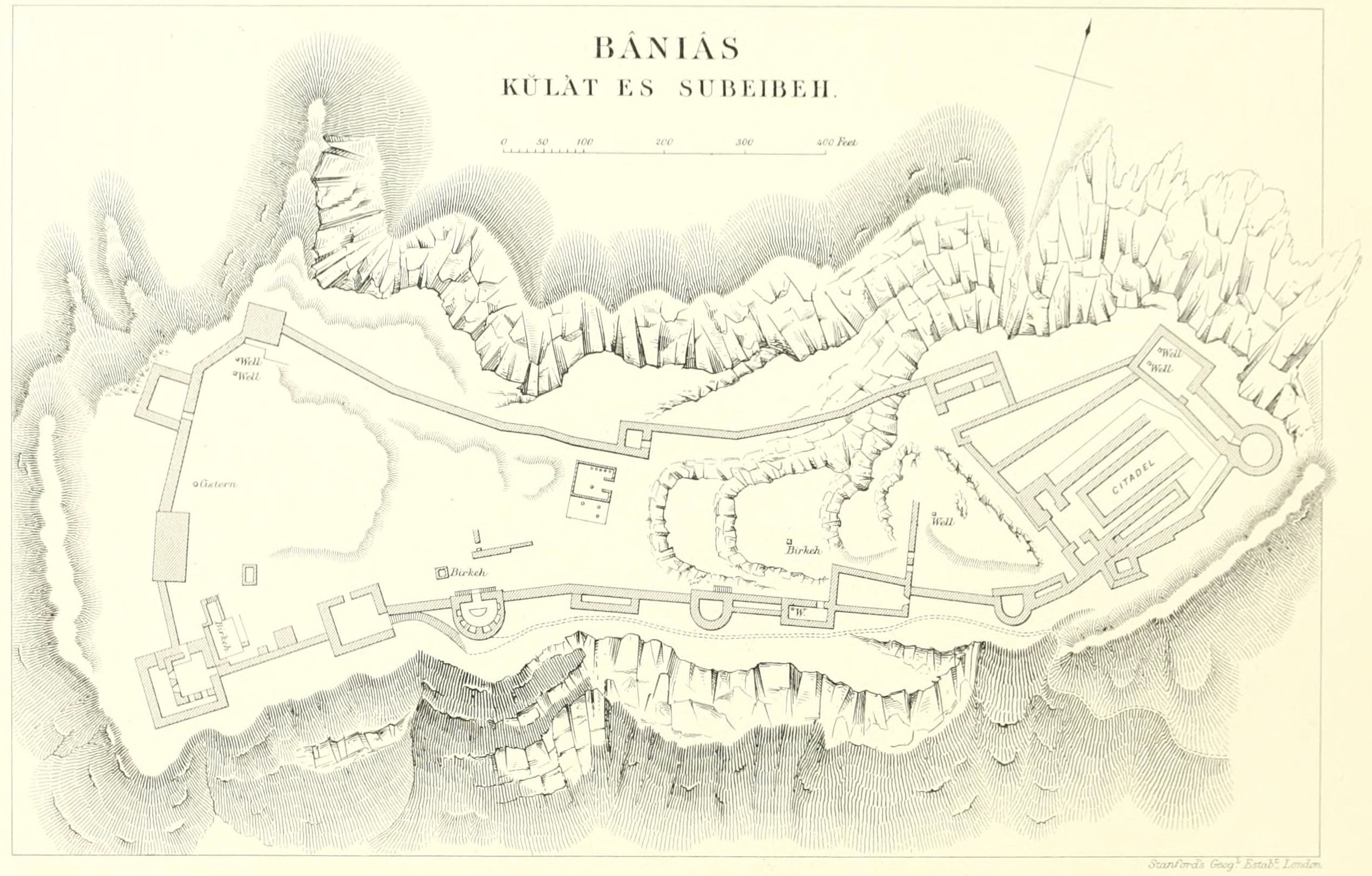
Kŭl’at es-Subeibeh, near Banias, from the 1871-77 PEF Survey of Palestine

The Crusaders' arrival in 1099 quickly split the mosaic of semi-independent cities of the Seljuk sultanate of Damascus.

The Crusaders held the town twice, between 1129–1132 and 1140–1164. It was called by the Franks Belinas or Caesarea Philippi. From 1126–1129, the town was held by Assassins, and was turned over to the Franks following the purge of the sect from Damascus by Buri. Later on, Shams al-Mulk Isma'il attacked Banias and captured it on 11 December 1132. In 1137, Banias became under the rule of Imad al-Din Zengi. In late spring 1140, Mu'in ad-Din Unur handed Banias to the Crusaders during the reign of King Fulk, due to their assistance against Zengi's aggression towards Damascus.

With the arrival of fresh troops to the Holy Land, King Baldwin III of Jerusalem broke the three-month-old truce of February 1157 by raiding the large flocks that the Turcoman people had pastured in the area. In that year, Banias became the principal centre of Humphrey II of Toron's fiefdom, along with his being the constable of the Kingdom of Jerusalem, after it had first been granted to the Knights Hospitaller by Baldwin III. The Knights Hospitaller, having fallen into an ambush, relinquished the fiefdom.

On 18 May 1157, Nūr ad-Din began a siege on Banias using mangonels, a type of siege engine. Humphrey was under attack in Banias and Baldwin III was able to break the siege, only to be ambushed at Jacob's Ford in June 1157. The fresh troops arriving from Antioch and Tripoli were able to relieved the besieged crusaders.

The Lordship of Banias which was a sub-vassal within the Lordship of Beirut, was captured by Nūr ad-Din on 18 November 1164. The Franks had built a castle at Hunin (Château Neuf) in 1107 to protect the trade route from Damascus to Tyre. After Nūr ad-Din's ousting of Humphrey of Toron from Banias, Hunin was at the front line securing the border defences against the Muslim garrison at Banias.

Ibn Jubayr, the geographer, traveller and poet from al-Andalus, described Banias:

This city is a frontier fortress of the Muslims. It is small, but has a castle, round which, under the walls flows a stream. This stream flows out from the town by one of the gates, and turns a mill ... The town has broad arable lands in the adjacent plain. Commanding the town is the fortress, still belonging to the Franks, called Hunin, which lies 3 leagues distant from Banias. The lands in the plain belong half to the Franks and half to the Muslims; and there is here the boundary called Hadd al Mukasimah-"the boundary of the dividing." The Muslims and the Franks apportion the crops equally between them, and their cattle mingle freely without fear of any being stolen.”

After the death of Nūr ad-Din in May 1174, King Amalric I of Jerusalem led the crusader forces in a siege of Banias. The Governor of Damascus allied himself with the crusaders and released all his Frankish prisoners. With the death of Amalric I in July 1174, the crusader border became unstable. In 1177, King Baldwin IV of Jerusalem laid siege to Banias and again the crusader forces withdrew after receiving tribute from Samsan al-Din Ajuk, the Governor of Banias.

In 1179, Saladin took personal control of the forces of Banias and created a protective screen across the Hula through Tell al-Qadi. In 1187, Saladin's son al-Afdal was able to send a force of 7,000 horsemen from Banias, that participated in the Battle of Cresson and the Battle of Hattin. By the end of Saladin's life, Banias was in the territory of al-Afdal, Emir of Damascus, and in the Iqta' of Hussam al-Din Bishara.

In 1200, Sultan al-Adil I sent Fakhr al-Din Jaharkas to seize Kŭl’at es-Subeibeh, a fortress located on a high hill above Banias, from Hussam al-Din, and reaffirmed Jaharkas as the holder of the iqta' in 1202. A strong earthquake the same year had its epicenter close to Banias, and the city was partially destroyed. Jaharkas rebuilt the burj (fortress tower). He took control of other properties - Tibnin, Hunin, Beaufort and Tyron. After his death, these lands were in the hands of Sarim ad-Din Khutluba. Shortly after the start of the Fifth Crusade, Banias was raided by the Franks for three days. Later, Al-Mu'azzam Isa, son of al-Adil, started to dismantle (slight) fortifications across Palestine, in order to deny their protection should the Crusaders gain them, by fight or by land exchange. So, in March 1219, Khutluba was forced to relinquish Banias and destroy its fortress.

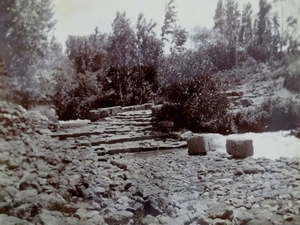
At Banias or Caesaria Philippi, 1891

Probably at the same time, the city was passed to Al-Mu'azzam's brother, al-'Aziz 'Uthman. For a while it was ruled as the hereditary principality of the dynast and his sons. The fourth prince, al-Sa'id Hasan, surrendered it to As-Salih Ayyub in 1247. He later tried to retake the land, at the time of An-Nasir Yusuf, but was imprisoned.

In 1252 Banias was attacked by the forces of the Seventh Crusade and took it, but they were driven out by the garrison of Subeiba.

Al-Sa'id Hasan of Banias, released by Hulegu during the Mongol invasion of Syria, allied with him, and took part in the Battle of Ain Jalut.

In 1209, a Jewish traveler and rabbi, Samuel ben Samson visited Banias after visiting Bar'am. He identified the site, which he called Pameas, with the ancient city of Dan. He adds that "beyond this city is the sepulchre of Iddo the Prophet," whose burial there was also mentioned by another Jewish traveler, Rabbi Jacob, in 1255/1256. Around 1300, Syrian geographer al-Dimashqi wrote of Banias: "It is a very ancient and well-fortified town, and there is plenty of sage plant here. The soil and climate are good, and water is abundant. There are many remains of the Greeks here. It was built, it is said, by Balniâs (Pliny) the Sage…"

During the Mamluk period, Banias served as the provincial seat of a subdistrict ('amal) subordinate to Damascus. It controlled all of the northern part of the Golan, in addition to the southern parts of Mt. Hermon. According to Marom, it was "an important fortress town [...] with its military command located in Qal‘at al- Ṣubayba overlooking the town, on the border between the provinces of Ṣafad and Damascus."

=== Ottoman period ===
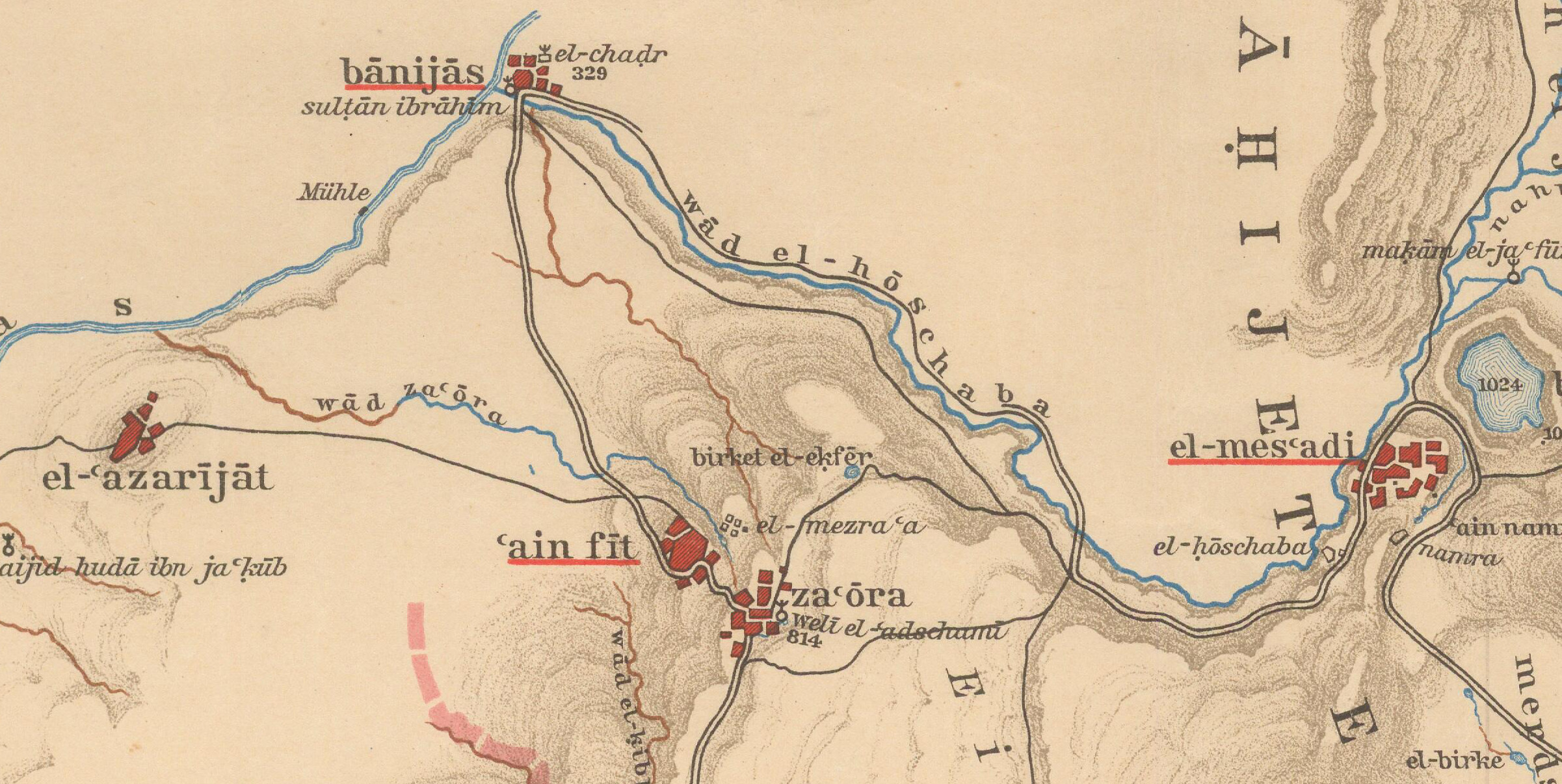
Gottlieb Schumacher (1900s)

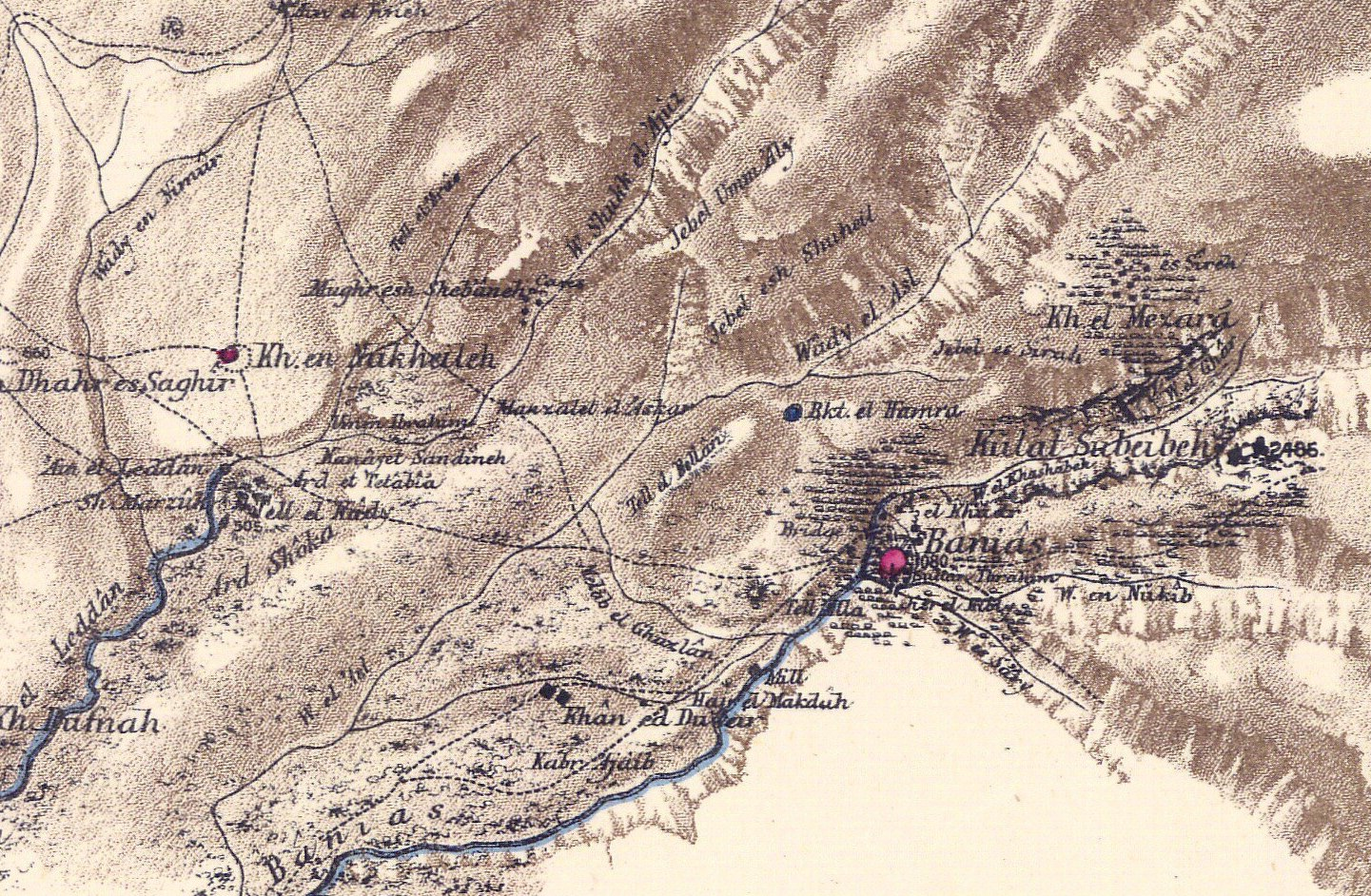
PEF Survey of Palestine (1880s)

Maps of the town of Banias

The traveller J. S. Buckingham described Banias in 1825: "The present town is small, and meanly built, having no place of worship in it; and the inhabitants, who are about 500 in number, are Mohammedans and Metouali, governed by a Moslem Sheikh."

In the 1870s, Banias was described as "a village, built of stone, containing about 350 Moslems, situated on a raised table-land at the bottom of the hills of Mount Hermon. The village is surrounded by gardens crowded with fruit-trees. The source of the Jordan is close by, and the water runs in little aqueducts into and under every part of the modern village."

=== 20th century ===
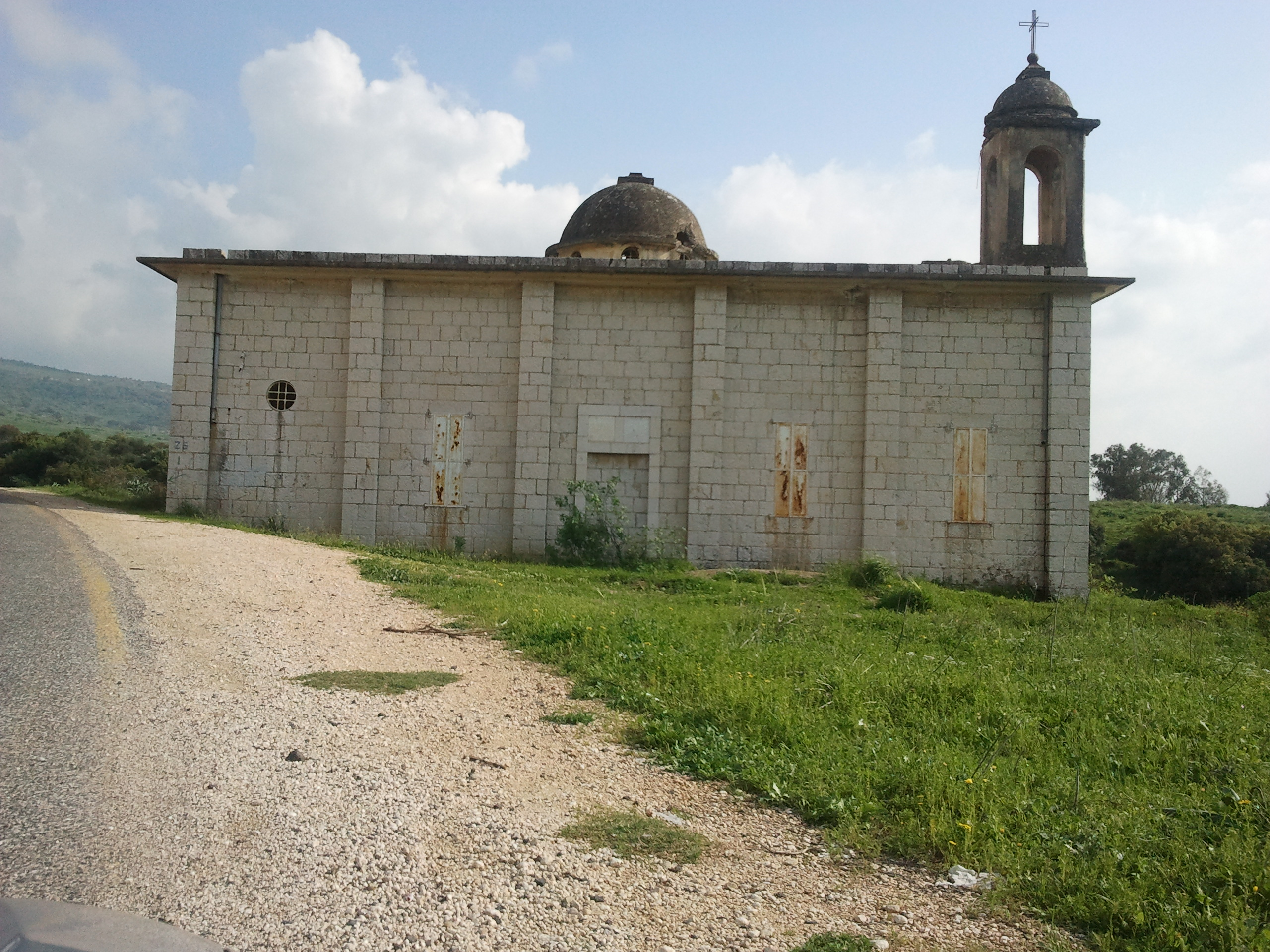
Banias church

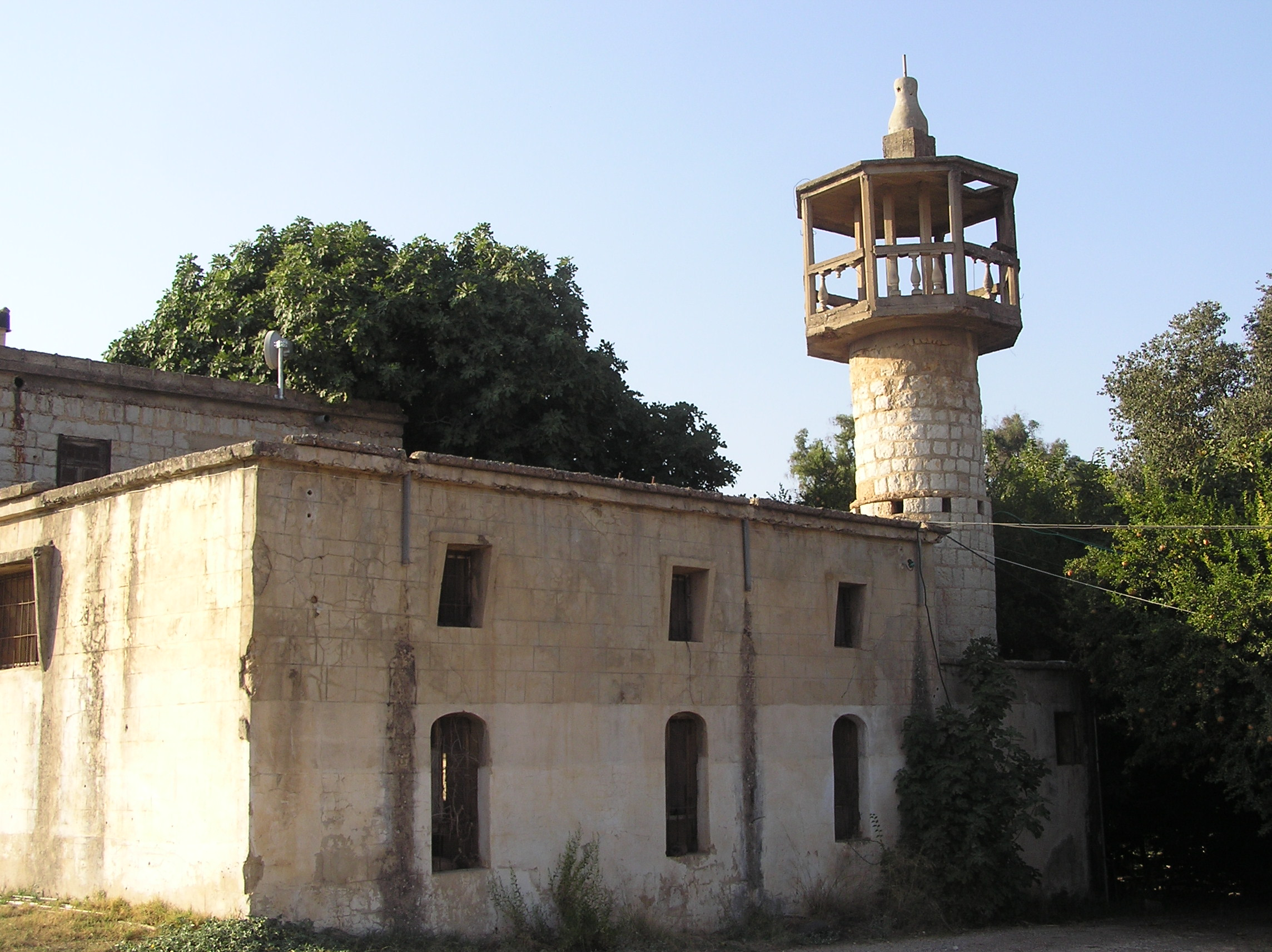
Banias mosque

The Syria-Lebanon-Palestine boundary was a product of the post-World War I Anglo-French partition of Ottoman Syria. British forces had advanced to a position at Tel Hazor against Turkish troops in 1918 and wished to incorporate all the sources of the Jordan River within the British controlled Palestine. Due to the French inability to establish administrative control, the frontier between Syria and Palestine was fluid.

Following the Paris Peace Conference of 1919, and the unratified and later annulled Treaty of Sèvres, stemming from the San Remo conference, the 1920 boundary extended the British controlled area to north of the Sykes Picot line, a straight line between the mid point of the Sea of Galilee and Nahariya. In 1920 the French managed to assert authority over the Arab nationalist movement and after the Battle of Maysalun, King Faisal was deposed.

The international boundary between Palestine and Syria was agreed by Great Britain and France in 1923 in conjunction with the Treaty of Lausanne, after Britain had been given a League of Nations mandate for Palestine in 1922. Banyas (on the Quneitra/Tyre road) was within the French Mandate of Syria. The border was set 750 metres south of the spring.

In 1941, Australian forces occupied Banias in the advance to the Litani during the Syria-Lebanon Campaign; Free French and Indian forces also invaded Syria in the Battle of Kissoué. Banias's fate in this period was left in a state of limbo since Syria had come under British military control. When Syria was granted independence in April 1946, it refused to recognize the 1923 boundary agreed between Britain and France. (Note: "Syria claimed that France's signature on the border agreement was invalid, but the British would not discuss the situation. A 'Demilitarised zone' was created at the three disputed points along the border, one of which was the territory around Banias, with Syria withdrawing troops, but continuing to lay claim to the territory within the zone. Thus from the beginning of the Syrian state to the Six Day War, there was no settled border.")

Following the 1948 Arab Israeli War, the Banias spring remained in Syrian territory, while the Banias River flowed through the Demilitarized Zone (DMZ) into Israel. In 1953, at one of a series of meetings to regularize administration of the DMZs, Syria offered to adjust the armistice lines, and cede to Israel 70% of the DMZ, in exchange for a return to the pre-1946 International border in the Jordan basin area, with Banias water resources returning to Syrian sovereignty. On 26 April, the Israeli cabinet met to consider the Syrian suggestions, with head of Israel's Water Planning Authority, Simha Blass, in attendance.

Blass noted that while the land to be ceded to Syria was not suitable for cultivation, the Syrian map did not suit Israel's water development plan. Blass explained that the movement of the International boundary in the area of Banias would affect Israel's water rights. (Note: At the eighth meeting on 13 April, the Syrian delegates seemed very anxious to move forward and offered Israel around 70% of the DMZ's. Significant results were achieved and a number of suggestions and summaries put in writing, but they required decisions by the two governments. The Israeli cabinet convened on 26 April to consider the Syrian suggestions for the division of the DMZs. Simha Blass, head of Israel's Water Planning Authority, was invited to the meeting. Dayan showed Blass the Syrian suggestions on the map. Blass told Dayan that although most of the lands that Israel was expected to relinquish were not suitable for cultivation, the map did not suit Israel's irrigation and water development plans... Although phrased in a positive manner, this decision appears to have killed the negotiations. It involved changes to the preliminary accord and new conditions that made it difficult to go forward. At the last two meetings, on 4 and 27 May Israel presented its new conditions. These were rejected by Syria, and the negotiations ended without agreement.) The Israeli cabinet rejected the Syrian proposals but decided to continue the negotiations by making changes to the accord and placing conditions on the Syrian proposals. The Israeli conditions took into account Blass's position over water rights and Syria rejected the Israeli counter-offer.

In September 1953, Israel advanced plans for its National Water Carrier to help irrigate the coastal Sharon Plain and eventually the Negev desert by launching a diversion project on a nine-mile (14 km) channel midway between the Huleh Marshes and Sea of Galilee in the central DMZ to be rapidly constructed. This prompted shelling from Syria and friction with the Eisenhower Administration; the diversion was moved to the southwest.

The Banias was included in the Jordan Valley Unified Water Plan, which allocated Syria 20 million cubic metres annually from it. The plan was rejected by the Arab League. Instead, at the 2nd Arab summit conference in Cairo of January 1964 the League decided that Syria, Lebanon and Jordan would begin a water diversion project. Syria started the construction of canal to divert the flow of the Banias river away from Israel and along the slopes of the Golan toward the Yarmouk River. Lebanon was to construct a canal from the Hasbani River to Banias and complete the scheme

The project was to divert 20 to 30 million cubic metres of water from the river Jordan tributaries to Syria and Jordan for the development of Syria and Jordan. The diversion plan for the Banias called for a 73 kilometre long canal to be dug 350 metres above sea level, that would link the Banias with the Yarmuk. The canal would carry the Banias's fixed flow plus the overflow from the Hasbani (including water from the Sarid and Wazani). This led to military intervention from Israel, first with tank fire and then, as the Syrians shifted the works further eastward, with airstrikes.

On June 10, 1967, the last day of the Six Day War, the Golani Brigade captured the village of Banias. Israel's priority on the Syrian front was to take control of the water sources. After the local residents fled to Majdal Shams, the village was destroyed by Israeli bulldozers, leaving only the mosque, church and shrines.

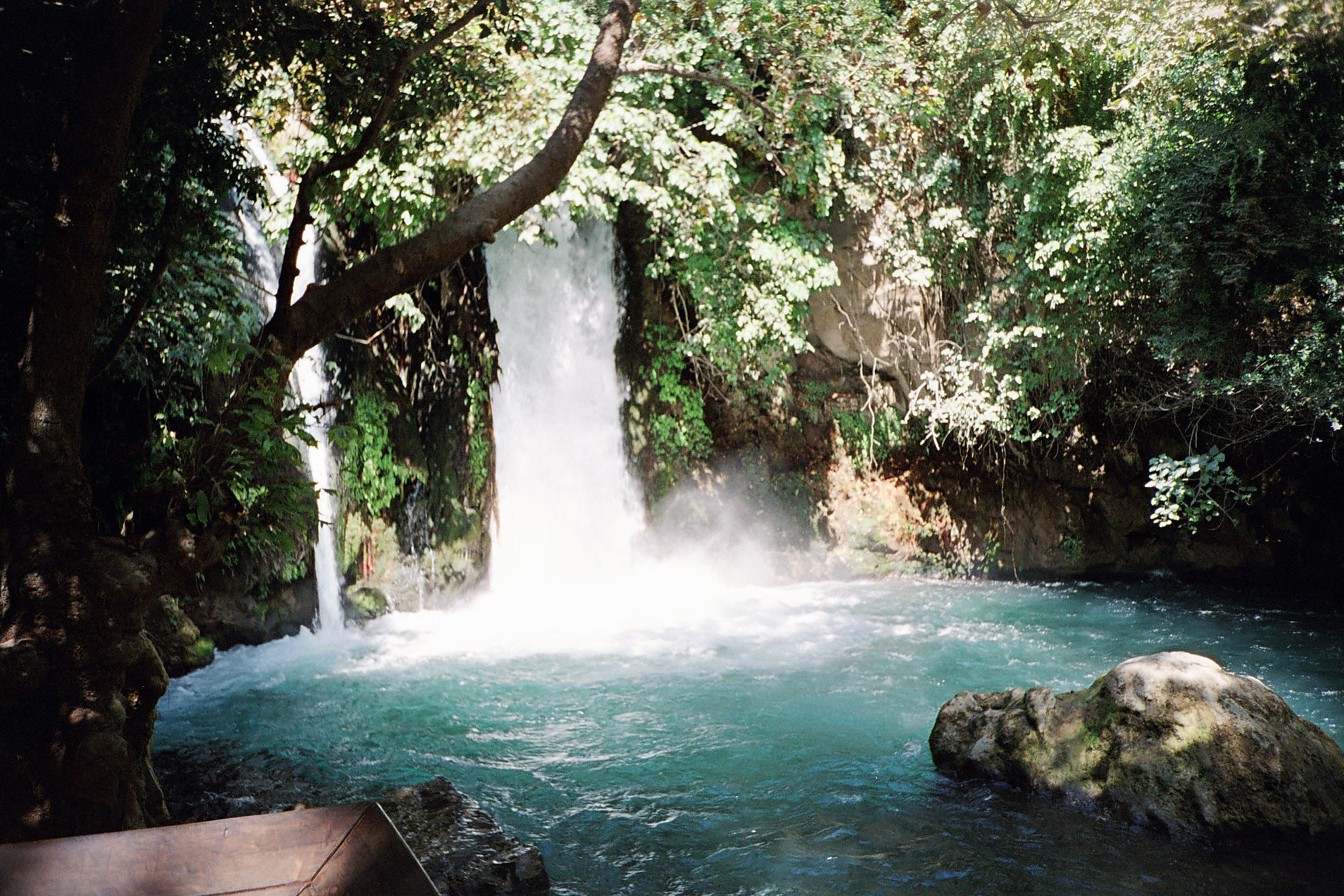
Banias Waterfall

In 1977, the Banias was declared a nature reserve by the Israel Nature and Parks Authority, named Hermon Stream (Banias) Nature Reserve. It consists of two areas – the springs and the archaeological site, and the waterfall with a hanging trail. Modern Israeli tourism signage at Banias differ from how it was presented under Syrian administration.

In 2022, a cache of 44 gold coins, approximately 1,400 years old, was discovered in the reserve during excavations by the Israel Antiquities Authority, which attest to the conquest of the Byzantine Empire by the Umayyad dynasty.

== Notables from Banias ==
- Al-Wadin ibn ‘Ata al-Dimashki (d. 764 or 766) - an Arab scholar of the Umayyad era

== See also ==
- Confession of Peter, New Testament event from the region of Caesarea Philippi (Banias)
- List of places associated with Jesus
- Vassals of the Kingdom of Jerusalem
- Water politics in the Middle East

== Bibliography ==
- al-Athīr, ʻIzz al-Dīn Ibn (Translated 2006) The Chronicle of Ibn Al-Athīr for the Crusading Period from Al-Kāmil Fīʼl-taʼrīkh: The Years AH 491-541/1097-1146, the Coming of the Franks And the Muslim Response Translated by Donald Sidney Richards Ashgate Publishing, Ltd. ISBN 0-7546-4078-7
- Berlin, A.M. (1999). "The Archaeology of Ritual: The Sanctuary of Pan at Banias/Caesrae Philippi". Bulletin of the American Schools of Oriental Research (315: 27–45): 27–45. doi:10.2307/1357531. JSTOR 1357531. S2CID 163379333.
- Bromiley, G.W. (1995). International Standard Bible Encyclopedia: A-D. Wm. B. Eerdmans Publishing. ISBN 0-8028-3781-6.
- Brown, P. (1971). The World of Late Antiquity. New York: W. W. Norton. ISBN 0-393-95803-5.
- Buckingham, J. S. (1825). Travels among the Arab Tribes inhabiting the countries east of Syria and Palestine…. London: Longman, Hurst, Rees, Orme, Brown and Green.
- Conder, C.R.; Kitchener, H.H. (1881). The Survey of Western Palestine: Memoirs of the Topography, Orography, Hydrography, and Archaeology. Vol. 1. London: Committee of the Palestine Exploration Fund.
- Fitzmyer, J.L. (1991). A Christological Catechism: New Testament Answers. Paulist Press. ISBN 0-8091-3253-2.
- Friedland, Elise A., "Roman Marble Sculpture from the Levant: The Group from the Sanctuary of Pan at Caesarea Philippi (Panias).” PhD Dissertation (University of Michigan 1997).
- Fromkin, D. (1989). A Peace to End All Peace: The Fall of the Ottoman Empire and the Creation of the Modern Middle East. New York: Owl. ISBN 0-8050-6884-8.
- Fulton, Michael S. (2018). Artillery in the Era of the Crusades: Siege Warfare and the Development of Trebuchet Technology. BRILL. ISBN 9789004376922.
- Gammer, Moshe; Kostiner, Joseph; Shemesh, Moshe (2003). Political Thought and Political History: Studies in Memory of Elie Kedourie. Routledge. ISBN 0-7146-5296-2.
- Gregorian, V. (2003). Islam: A Mosaic, Not a Monolith. Brookings Institution Press. ISBN 0-8157-3283-X.
- Guérin, V. (1880). Description Géographique Historique et Archéologique de la Palestine (in French). Vol. 3: Galilee, pt. 2. Paris: L'Imprimerie Nationale. (p. 308 ff.)
- Hartal, Moshe (2007-04-16). "Banias, the Southwestern Tower". Hadashot Arkheologiyot – Excavations and Surveys in Israel (119). doi:10.69704/jhaesi.116.2004.503.
- Hartal, Moshe (2008-03-18). "Banias". Hadashot Arkheologiyot – Excavations and Surveys in Israel (120). doi:10.69704/jhaesi.116.2004.713.
- Hartal, Moshe (2008-11-23). "Banias". Hadashot Arkheologiyot – Excavations and Surveys in Israel (120).
- Hindley, Geoffrey. (2004) The Crusades: Islam and Christianity in the Struggle for World Supremacy Carroll & Graf Publishers, ISBN 0-7867-1344-5
- Humphreys, R.S. (1977). From Saladin to the Mongols: The Ayyubids of Damascus, 1193-1260. New York: SUNY press. ISBN 0-87395-263-4.
- Jackson, Peter (2007). "The Crusades of 1239–41 and their aftermath". In Hawting, Gerald R. (ed.). Muslims, Mongols and Crusaders: An Anthology of Articles. Routledge. ISBN 978-0-203-64182-8.
- Jastrow, M (1903). A Dictionary of the Targumim, the Talmud Bavli and Yerushalmi, and the Midrashic Literature.
- Josephus The Jewish War ISBN 0-14-044420-3
- Kent, C.F. (1916). Biblical Geography and History. New York: Ch. Scribner's Sons.
- Le Strange, G. (1890). Palestine Under the Moslems: A Description of Syria and the Holy Land from A.D. 650 to 1500. London: Committee of the Palestine Exploration Fund. (pp. 15, 34, 380, 418)
- Lock, Peter (2006). The Routledge Companion to the Crusades. Routledge. ISBN 9-78-0-415-39312-6.
- Maalouf, Amin (1984). The Crusades Through Arab Eyes. SAQI. ISBN 978-0-86356-023-1.
- Madden, F.W. (1864). History of Jewish Coinage, and of Money in the Old and New Testament. London: B. Quaritch.
- Ma‘oz, Z.-U. ed., Excavations in the Sanctuary of Pan at Caesarea Philippi-Baniyas, 1988-1993 (Jerusalem, forthcoming).
- Ma‘oz, Z.-U., Baniyas: The Roman Temples (Qazrin: Archaostyle, 2009).
- Ma‘oz, Z.-U., Baniyas in the Greco-Roman Period: A History Based on the Excavations (Qazrin: Archaostyle, 2007).
- Ma‘oz, Z.-U., V. Tzaferis, and M. Hartal, “Banias,” in The New Encyclopedia of Archaeological Excavations in the Holy Land 1 and 5 (Jerusalem 1993 and 2008), 136-143, 1587-1594.
- MacMillan, M. (2001). Peacemakers: The Paris Conference of 1919 and Its Attempt to End War. J. Murray. ISBN 0-7195-5939-1.
- Murphy-O'Connor, J. (2008). The Holy Land: An Oxford Archaeological Guide from Earliest Times to 1700. Oxford University Press US. ISBN 978-0-19-923666-4.
- Negev, A.; Gibson, S. (2001). Paneas; Banias; Caesarea Philippi. New York and London: Continuum. ISBN 0-8264-1316-1.
- Norwich, J.J. (1999). Byzantium; The Early Centuries. Knopf. ISBN 0-14-011447-5.
- Polybius: The Rise of the Roman Empire, Translated by Ian Scott-Kilvert Contributor F. W. Walbank, Penguin Classics, 1979 ISBN 0-14-044362-2
- Pringle, D. (1997). Secular buildings in the Crusader Kingdom of Jerusalem: an archaeological Gazetter. Cambridge University Press. ISBN 0521-46010-7.
- Pringle, Denys (2011). Pilgrimage to Jerusalem and the Holy Land, 1187-1291. Ashgate Pub. ISBN 978-1-4094-3607-2. OCLC 785151012.
- Provan, I.W.; Long, V. P.; Longman, T. (2003). A Biblical History of Israel. Westminster John Knox Press. ISBN 0-664-22090-8.
- Richard, J. (1999). The Crusades c.1071-c.1291. Cambridge University press. ISBN 0-521-62566-1.
- Robinson, E.; Smith, E. (1841). Biblical Researches in Palestine, Mount Sinai and Arabia Petraea: A Journal of Travels in the year 1838. Vol. 3. Boston: Crocker & Brewster.
- Salibi, K.S. (1977). Syria Under Islam: Empire on Trial, 634-1097. Caravan Books. ISBN 0-88206-013-9.
- Saulcy, L.F. de (1854). Narrative of a journey round the Dead Sea, and in the Bible lands, in 1850 and 1851. Vol. 2, 2nd edition. London: R. Bentley.
- Schürer, E.; Millar, F.; Vermès, G. (1973). The History of the Jewish People in the Age of Jesus Christ (175 B.C.-A.D. 135). Continuum International Publishing Group. ISBN 0-567-02242-0.
- Shapira, A. (1999). Land and Power; The Zionist Resort to Force, 1881-1948. Stanford University Press. ISBN 0-8047-3776-2.
- Shlaim, A. (2000). The Iron Wall: Israel and the Arab World.
- Segev, T. (2007). 1967; Israel and the war that transformed the Middle East. Little, Brown. ISBN 978-1-429-91167-2.
- Smithline, Howard (2006-02-01). "Banias". Hadashot Arkheologiyot – Excavations and Surveys in Israel (118).
- Tzaferis, V., and S. Israeli, Paneas, Volume I: The Roman to Early Islamic Periods, Excavations in Areas A, B, E, F, G, and H (IAA Reports 37, Jerusalem 2008).
- Wilson, John Francis (2004). Caesarea Philippi: Banias, the Lost City of Pan. I. B. Tauris. ISBN 1-85043-440-9.
