= Iturea =

Levantine region north of Galilee during the Late Hellenistic and early Roman periods

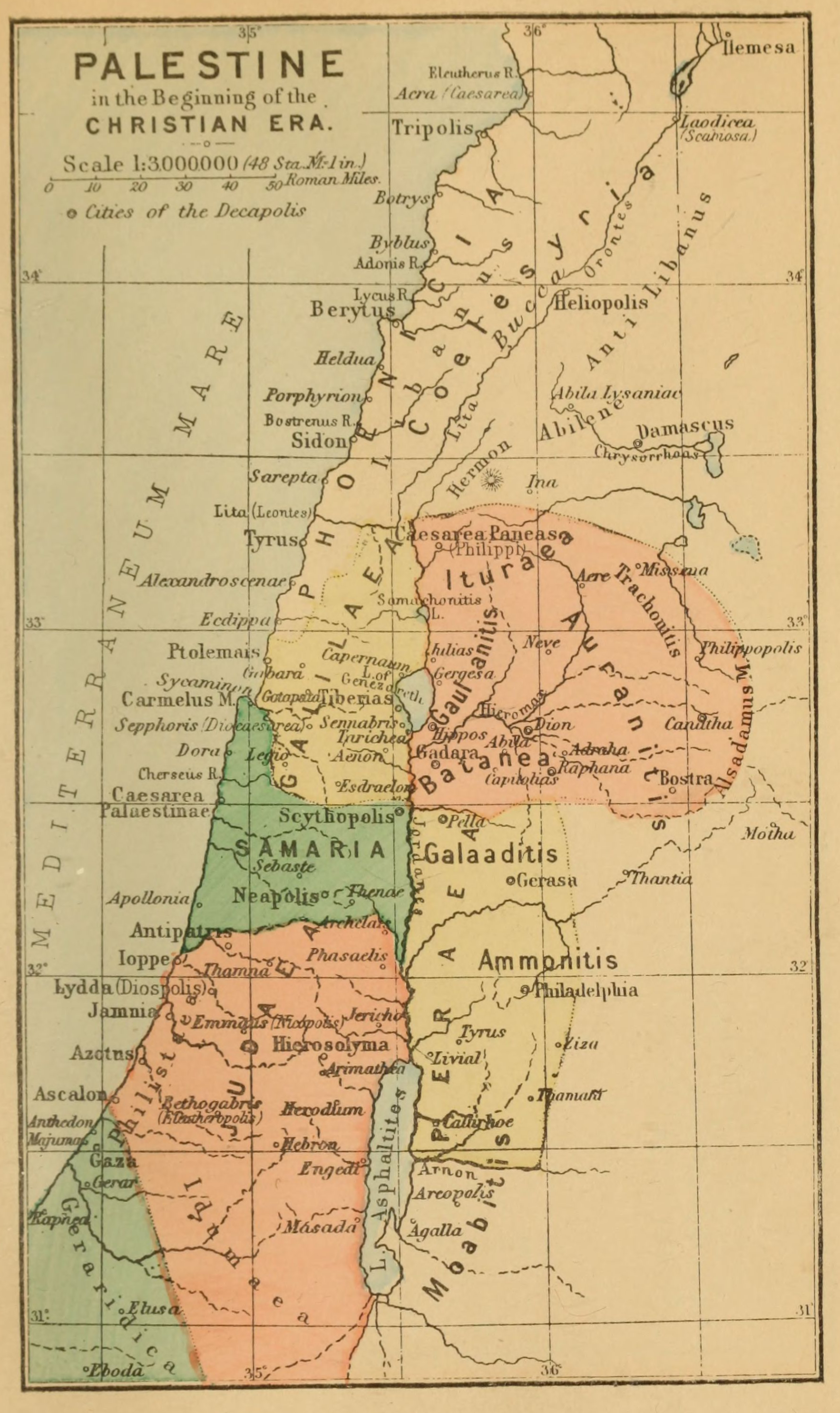
Map of Roman Judea in the first century; according to Conder (1889)

Iturea or Ituraea (Ancient Greek: Ἰτουραία, Itouraía) is the Greek name of a Levantine region north of Galilee during the Late Hellenistic and early Roman periods. It extended from Mount Lebanon across the plain of Marsyas to the Anti-Lebanon Mountains in Syria, with its capital Chalcis which remains unidentified.

== Itureans ==
The Itureans (Greek: Ἰτουραῖοι) were a Semitic-speaking tribe who lived in present-day Syria and Lebanon whose origin and linguistic identity remain disputed. Some scholars identify them as Arabs, while others believe that they were an Aramaean people, possibly the descendants of the Iron age kingdom of Sobah in the Beqaa valley.

The Itureans appear in historical sources from the first half of the 2nd century BC onwards. They rose to power in the aftermath of the decline of the Seleucids in the 2nd century BC. From their base around Mount Lebanon and the Beqaa Valley, they expanded into the northern Golan and Mount Hermon as well as the Hauran. The territory under their control possibly also included parts of northern Galilee. Many Christian theologians, among them Eusebius, place Iturea near Trachonitis. According to Josephus, the Iturean kingdom lay north of Galilee.

== Etymology ==
Several etymologies have been proposed for the name Iturea and much uncertainty still remains.

Based on the Septuagint translation of 1Ch 5:19 several commentators, including Gesenius, John Gill and William Muir, equated the Itureans with Jetur, one of the former Hagrite encampments, named after a son of Ishmael. Later scholars who propose a late origin for the Biblical texts continued to equate the names but viewed the writers of the Bible as basing the Biblical name on that of the Itureans of later centuries. More recent scholars have dismissed such direct relationships between the Biblical Jetur and the Itureans. The account of the Hagrites places Jetur east of Gilead and describes the end of that tribe which was conquered by the Israelites in the days of Saul, whereas Iturea has been confirmed to be north of Galilee and the Itureans first appear in the Hellenistic period with their location only being referred to as Iturea in the Roman period. Although Jetur is translated Itouraion (Ιτουραιων) in 1Ch 5:19, the rendering of the name is not consistent across the Septuagint with the occurrences in Ge 25:15 and 1Ch 1:31 being transliterated Ietour (Ιετουρ) and Iettour (Ιεττουρ) respectively. The translation Itouraion in 1Ch 5:19 (if not an error) would thus be a reinterpretation by the translator of the name of this ancient tribe as referring to a contemporary people. Moreover, in Josephus where both names are mentioned, Jetur (Ιετουρ-) is rendered differently in Greek to Iturea (Ιτουρ-). Similarly in the Vulgate the two localities have different Latin names (Iathur for Jetur and Itureae for Iturea) showing that writers of antiquity did not view the names as the same. Eupolemus used the term Itureans to refer to people from the Biblical region of Aram-Zobah, not Jetur, when describing the wars of King David.

Smith's Bible Dictionary attempted to equate the modern Arabic region name Jedur (جدور) with both Jetur and Iturea. However, the Arabic j (ج) corresponds to Hebrew g (ג) and not y (י), and Arabic d (د) does not correspond to Hebrew ṭ (ט) or Greek t (τ) and the mainstream view is that Jedur is instead the Biblical Gedor (גדור).

David Urquhart linked the Itureans with Aturea, a name for the region of Nineveh, a variant of Assyria, suggesting that the Itureans were originally Assyrians, also implying a connection with the Druze living in the region in his time. (The name "Druze" is however unrelated to "Iturean".)

Ernest Axel Knauf related Iturea to the Safaitic name Yaẓur (יט׳ור, يظور) which is rendered Yaṭur (יטור) in Nabatean Aramaic. Before being established as the name of a people (Al-Yaẓur or Yaṭureans), this name is found as a personal name, in particular that of a Nabatean prince with a brother Zabud, whose name may be connected with that of the Zabadaeans, another Nabatean tribe who together with the Itureans had been conquered by the Hasmoneans. Yaẓur in Safaitic inscriptions is seemingly a cognate of the Biblical name Jetur (Yeṭur, יטור) and is possibly derived from its original form. If this is the case, then Biblical Jetur would indirectly be the origin of the name Iturea although denoting a different region and people centuries before. Whether the names are indeed related hinges on their original meanings. The Gesenius' Hebrew-Chaldee Lexicon suggests that Jetur means "enclosure" related to the personal name Ṭur (טור) and the word ṭirah (טירה) denoting an encampment and explicitly used for the Ishmaelite encampments. This would contradict their being a connection with Yaẓur as in Arabic which like Safaitic preserves the distinction between the ẓ (ظ) and ṭ (ط) sounds, this root is found with ṭ and not ẓ. Thus if the Itureans derived their name from Jetur, the people known as the Yaẓur in Safaitic inscriptions would have been a different people, possibly only a small family group, while if the Itureans derived their name from Yaẓur there would be no connection with Jetur.

However, Hitchcock's Bible Names Dictionary suggests that Jetur means "order; succession; mountainous". A connection with "mountain" (more precisely "rock fortress") may refer to the Hebrew word ṣur (צור), a root which survives in Arabic ẓar (ظر) meaning "flint", the sound ẓ (ظ) having become ṣ (צ) in Hebrew. The spelling Yeṭur (יטור) would thus be the result of an Aramaic spelling convention in which the ẓ is represented by ṭet (ט) rather than its true Hebrew reflex ṣadi (צ). If this meaning is correct, then a linguistic connection between the names Jetur and Yaẓur remains a possibility; however, no occurrence of an Aramaic spelling of this nature in the Hebrew Bible is known even for names in the Aramaic and Arabic realms and the expected Hebrew spelling would be Yaṣur (יצור). The root ṭur (טור) having a basic meaning of row, line or fence (hence "order; succession"), also refers to a mountain range thus also providing a connection with "mountain".

A further phonetic complication exists in equating the name Iturea with either Jetur or Yaẓur. Yaẓur as a personal name is consistently found as Iatour- (Ιατουρ-) in Greek inscriptions. In Iatour- the initial Greek iota (Ι) is consonantal representing the initial y sound of Yaẓur. Similarly, in the transliterations Ietour- (Ιετουρ) and Iettour ((Ιεττουρ)) for Jetur in the Septuagint, the iota represents an original y - the Hebrew letter yod (י). However, in Itour- the iota is a vowel suggesting that it represents an i vowel in the original Semitic name rather than the consonant y. An initial iota may also be used for the syllable yi; however, such a reading of Itour- (Ιτουρ-) does not produce a meaningful form and no tradition of pronouncing it as such exists. As a vowel is always preceded by a consonant in Semitic words, the initial consonant would have been one of the four guttural consonants dropped in Greek transliteration (א,ה,ח,ע). This contradicts derivations from either Jetur or Yaẓur and is the basis of several alternative etymologies proposed by John Lightfoot.

Lightfoot considered a possible derivation from the root for "ten" (I.e. `-s-r, עשר) based on identification of Iturea with Decapolis ("ten cities"). However, he does not provide a grammatical form that would be vocalized as Itour- and ultimately dismisses this possibility as it involves an unattested sound change of s (ש) into t (ט). Decapolis is also a distinct region to Iturea.

Lightfoot also considered derivations from proposed terms whose meanings he gives as "wealth" (hittur, i.e. היתור) and "diggings" (chitture, i.e. חתורי). He favored the derivation from chitture noting the descriptions of the landscape. Derivations from hittur or chitture are problematic, however. The Semitic tav (ת) is normally transliterated by theta (θ) in Greek, not tau (τ). Additionally, although the consonants he (ה) and chet (ח) are dropped in Greek transliteration, they survive as a rough breathing provided to the initial vowel and are transliterated by "h" in Latin. However, no tradition of a rough breathing in the pronunciation of Itour- exists nor is Iturea ever given an initial h in Latin. A further difficulty is that while the roots of these two words are known, the forms which Lightfoot has used are conjectural.

Lightfoot also proposed a derivation from `iṭur (עטור) meaning "crowning" (or "decoration") Unlike his other proposals, this word is well attested and remains a plausible derivation as it would be transliterated as Itour- (Ιτουρ) in Greek. Regarding this possibility, Lightfoot notes familiarly of the notion of a country crowned with plenty in Talmudic writings. However, the name was first an ethnonym before becoming a toponym, and in the Josippon the Iturean nation is referred to as 'iṭuraios (איטוריאוס) in Hebrew rendered with an aleph (א) not an ayin (ע) showing that Jewish tradition, at least as preserved by the writer of the Josippon, did not view the name as being related to `iṭur (עטור) meaning "crowning".

In the Syriac Peshittas which are the texts closest in time to the period in which the tetrarchy of Iturea existed that provide a Semitic form of the name, it is called 'iṭuriya' (ܐܝܛܘܪܝܐ) rendered with an initial alap and yodh (ܐܝ). This may arise from either an initial 'i syllable or initial yi syllable in earlier Hebrew or Aramaic. As the latter does not produce a meaningful form it suggests that the original syllable is 'i indicating an initial aleph (א) in the original. This accords with the usage of aleph in the Josippon and suggests that the original Semitic form of the name was 'iṭur (איטור or אטור) or 'iẓur (איט׳ור or אט׳ור). The latter would share a common root with Hebrew ṣur (צור). However, the use of a ṭ (ט) not an ṣ (צ) in the Josippon indicates that the word was not understood as such by the author and indeed no grammatical form that would be vocalized as 'iẓur is known for this root. The former possibility 'iṭur (איטור or אטור) is the noun form of the known word 'iṭer (אטר) meaning "bound" or "shut up" in Hebrew ultimately sharing a common etymology with the word ṭirah (טירה) used for an encampment. A Nabatean personal name written 'i-ṭ-r-w (אטרו) based on one or the other of these roots is attested. In Aramaic, however, the base word ṭur (טור) is used particularly for a line of mountains rather than a boundary of an encampment and the understanding of the name Itureans in Syriac is "mountain dwellers" according with the location of their settlement being the Mount Lebanon region.

== History ==
=== Second century BCE ===
In 104 or 103 BCE, Hasmonean leader Aristobulus I campaigned against Iturea and added a part of it to the kingdom of Judea. Josephus cites a passage from Timagenes, excerpted by Strabo, which recounts that Aristobulus was "very serviceable to the Jews, for he added a country to them, and obtained a part of the nation of the Itureans for them, and bound to them by the bond of the circumcision of their genitals."

Whether the Hasmoneans in fact circumcised the Itureans and other populations against their will is uncertain. Strabo asserts that they formed a confederation with such tribes on the basis of a shared practice of circumcision, a reading that may be more plausible, though the Hasmonean policy appears to have been one of Judaizing (as noted in the case of the Idumaeans). Some earlier scholars treated Josephus/Timagenes's account as credible (e.g., Emil Schürer) or as a case of voluntary Judaization (e.g., Aryeh Kasher and Ariel Rappaport).

A number of modern scholars question the reliability of Josephus/Timagenes's report. Archaeological surveys identify Iturean material culture in the Beqaa Valley, the northern Golan, and Mount Hermon, but not in the Upper or Lower Galilee; these areas appear to have remained outside Hasmonean borders and retained a polytheistic Iturean character. Combined with evidence for Hasmonean control east of the Sea of Galilee prior to Aristobulus, this has led many to judge Josephus's account as exaggerated; Galilee's subsequent Judaization is now attributed chiefly to immigration from Judea rather than to mass conversion of Itureans.

=== First century BCE ===
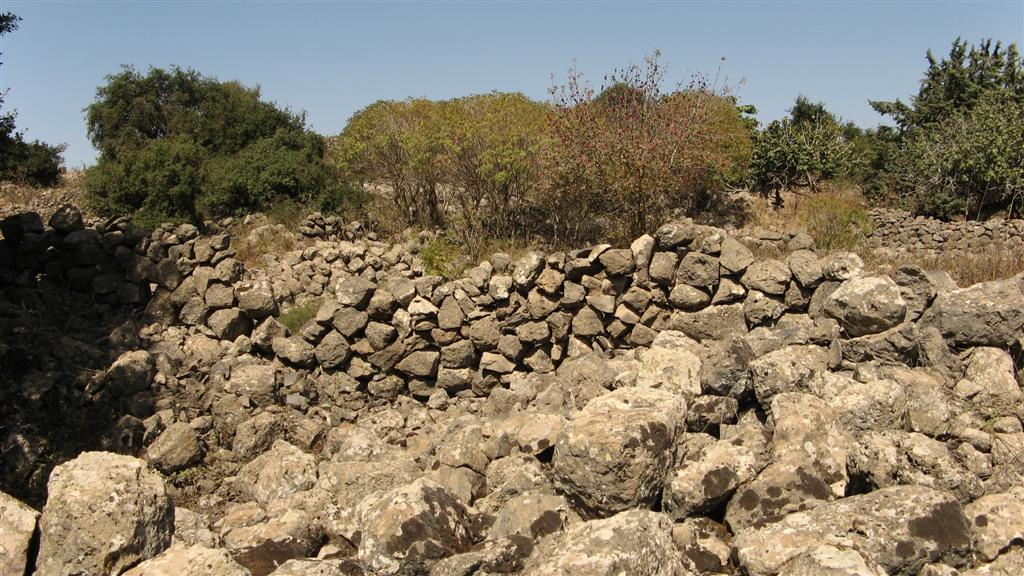
Ruins of an Iturean village in the Golan Heights

The Iturean kingdom appears to have had its centre in the kingdom of Ptolemy, son of Mennaeus (Mennæus), whose residence was at Chalcis(?) and who reigned from around 87/85 BC until around 40 BC. Ptolemy was succeeded by his son Lysanias, called by Dio Cassius (xlix. 32) "king of the Itureans." About 23 BC, Iturea with the adjacent provinces fell into the hands of a chief named Zenodorus (Josephus, l.c. xv. 10, § 1; idem, B. J. i. 20, § 4). Three years later, at the death of Zenodorus, Augustus gave Iturea to Herod the Great, who in turn bequeathed it to his son Philip (Josephus, Ant. xv. 10, § 3). The Iturean kings minted a series of bronze coins depicting mostly Greco-Roman deities.

=== First century CE ===
In 38 Caligula gave Iturea to a certain Soemus, who is called by Dio Cassius (lix. 12) and by Tacitus (Annals, xii. 23) "king of the Itureans." After the death of Soemus (49) his kingdom was incorporated into the province of Syria (Tacitus, l.c.). After this incorporation the Itureans furnished soldiers for the Roman army; and the designations Ala I Augusta Ituraeorum and Cohors I Augusta Ituraeorum are met with in the inscriptions (Ephemeris Epigraphica, 1884, p. 194).

The area and the Itureans are mentioned only once in the New Testament, in Luke 3, but are frequently described by pagan writers such as Strabo, Pliny the Elder, and Cicero. The Jewish writer Josephus also described them. They were known to the Romans as a predatory people, and were appreciated by them for their great skill in archery. They played a notable role in the defense of Jerusalem.

An inscription of about the year 6 AD (Ephemeris Epigraphica, 1881, pp. 537–542) mentions that Quintus Aemilius Secundus was sent by Quirinius against the Itureans in Mount Lebanon.
