= Zenodorus (son of Lysanias) =

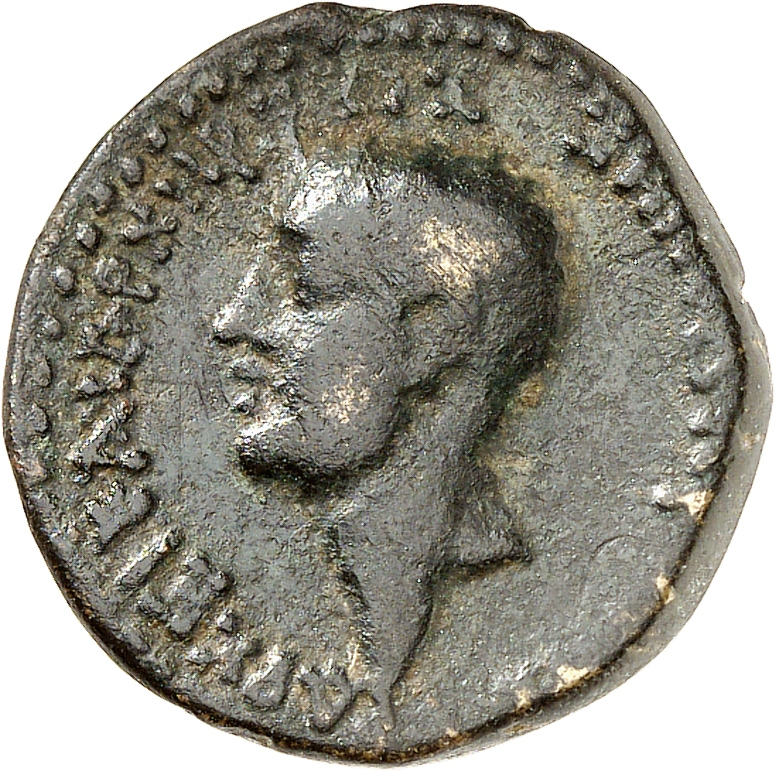
- Portrait of Zenodorus on the reverse of a coin, printed c. 32 BCE–31 BCE, held in the Münzkabinett Berlin
- Reign: c. 30 BCE–20 BCE
- Predecessor: Lysanias
- Successor: Herod the Great
- Died: 20 BCE

Zenodorus (Greek: Ζηνόδωρος) was the ruler of a small principality in the vicinity of Damascus described by Josephus as the "house of Lysanias", 23-20 BCE.

== Biography ==
Though Josephus does not seem to know it, Zenodorus was actually the son of Lysanias, for a funerary inscription found at Heliopolis (Baalbek) was dedicated to "Zenodorus the son of Lysanias the tetrarch" (of Iturea). He gained control, on lease we are told, of some of his father's territory (confiscated when his father had been executed by Mark Antony), but it is not clear exactly what his territory was for Josephus only gives us information concerning areas south of Damascus (Ulatha and Paneas, both, we are told, west of Trachonitis), while the center of Lysanias's realm was north-west of Damascus. He may in fact have held the lease on his territories as far back as the time of his father's execution (36 BCE), doing the work of administering the region while initially paying rent to Cleopatra, though we only have Josephus's indications to follow. Coins minted during his reign describe Zenodorus as "tetrarch and high priest", a phrase also used on coins by his forebears. This indicates that for most of his possession of his father's lands, he was more than a lessee of the property.

Josephus reports Zenodorus was not satisfied with his earnings so he became involved in acts of robbery in the Trachonitis region south-east of Damascus as well as against Damascus itself. The Damascenes turned to the Roman governor to relieve their sufferings, which led Augustus to give control of the Trachonitis to Herod the Great, along with the task of bringing order to the area. Zenodorus went to Rome in an attempt to bring charges against Herod for the zealousness of his efforts in the Trachonitis, but returned, not having achieved anything.

Starting to despair for his situation Zenodorus sold a part of his lands called Auranitis for fifty talents, though this land had been confiscated by Augustus and given to Herod! Next he instigated the inhabitants of Gadara to make charges against Herod before Augustus who had come to Syria, but Augustus stood by Herod and the unrest dissipated. Zenodorus's problems were finally resolved when he suffered a ruptured intestine and died soon afterwards in Antioch.

Josephus's presentation of Zenodorus is rather negative and the interpretations he places on the events he describes may simply represent the propaganda of his major source for the period, Nicolaus of Damascus, an important functionary in the court of Herod the Great, who would have looked after Herod's best interests to the loss of Zenodorus.
