= Cultural depictions of Herod the Great =

This page lists cultural depictions of Herod the Great, grouped by order and arranged by date.

== Art and literature ==
=== Plays ===
- Herod appears in some cycles of the Mystery Plays, such as the pageant Herod the Great in the Towneley Cycle, played as an over-the-top villain. Such portrayals were still in folk memory in William Shakespeare's time, for Hamlet instructs the players not to "out-Herod Herod" (Act 3, Scene 2). This line is in turn quoted in regard to Prince Prospero in Edgar Allan Poe's "The Mask of the Red Death." Medieval dramatic portrayals of Herod may also have influenced Shakespeare's portrayal of Macbeth, King of Scotland in Macbeth.
- Herod the Great is a central character in Elizabeth Cary's The Tragedy of Mariam, the Fair Queen of Jewry (1613). The play is a work of historical fiction, set in 29 B.C., revolving around Herod's second wife, Mariam, and their families, when Herod is believed to have been killed by Octavian (later Caesar Augustus).

=== Sculpture and paint ===
- The Feast of Herod (Donatello)
- The Feast of Herod (Rubens)
- The Feast of Herod

== Film, radio and television ==
=== Film ===
- From the Manger to the Cross (1912), played by George Kellog
- The Star of Bethlehem (1912), played by William Russell
- Cleopatra (1934), played by Joseph Schildkraut
- Herod the Great (1959), played by Edmund Purdom
- King of Kings (1961), played by Grégoire Aslan
- The Gospel According to St. Matthew (1964), played by Amerigo Bevilacqua
- The Greatest Story Ever Told (1965), played by Claude Rains
- The Visual Bible: Matthew (1993), played by Patrick Mynhardt
- The 3 Kings (2000), played by Ron Moody
- The Nativity Story (2006), played by Ciarán Hinds
- Joseph & Mary (2016), played by Lawrence Bayne
- The Star (2017), voiced by Christopher Plummer
- The Penitent Thief (2020), played by Kevin Sorbo
- Journey to Bethlehem (2023), played by Antonio Banderas
- Mary (2024), played by Anthony Hopkins
- The King of Kings (2025), voiced by Mark Hamill
- Zero A. D.: The Birth of Christ, (2026), played by Jim Caviezel

=== Radio ===
- He appears in the first play of Dorothy L. Sayers' radio play cycle The Man Born to Be King.

=== Television ===
- Jesus of Nazareth (1977), played by Peter Ustinov
- The Nativity (1978), played by Leo McKern
- Mary, Mother of Jesus (1999), played by Hywel Bennett
- Rome (2007, episode 19, Death Mask), played by René Zagger
- The Bible (2013, episode 3, Hope), played by Sam Douglas
- Killing Jesus (2015), played by Kelsey Grammer
