= Tifi Odasi =

Italian poet

Michele di Bartolomeo degli Odasi (c. 1450–1492), pen name Tifi (dagli) Odasi (Latinized as Tifetus or Typhis Odaxius), was an Italian poet and author of macaronic verse. Very little is known of his biography, apart that he was born and died at Padua.

Tifi Odasi is best known as the author of Macaronea, a burlesque poem mixing Latin and Italian dialects (Tuscan and Venetian of Padua).

Some scholars conjecture that Tifi Odasi was the author of Nobile Vigoncae opus ("The Work of Noble Vigonza"), another work in macaronic Latin. The attribution is not widely accepted, however.

== Macaronea ==
Macaronea or Carmen Macaronicum de Patavinisis ("Macaronic Song from Padua") is a comical poem by Tifi Odasi. The poem tells of a prank played on an apothecary by a band of university students called macaronea secta. It is written in a mix of Latin and Italian, in hexameter verse (as would befit a classical Latin poem). It reads as a satire of the bogus humanism and pedantism of doctors, scholars and bureaucrats of the time.

The year of first printing is not indicated on the book itself, but is believed to be 1488 or 1489. The author's pen name is given as "Tifi" in the frontispice, and as "Tifetus" in an acrostic that precedes the text.

The title of the poem is thought to come from maccerone, a kind of pasta or dumpling eaten by peasants at the time.

The poem was a success; it was reprinted several times, and inspired many other Macaronea in the following decades.

The following excerpt describes the preparation for a magical rite where a duck would be served:

Original text
Mercurio fuerat lux illa sacrata, sed ille
ad strigariam zobiam spectaverat aptam.
Illa etiam nocte coniunx cavalcabat Herodis
et secum strige, secum caminat et Orcus;
Hanc expectavit tamen, oca tirante la gola.

English translation
That day was sacred to Mercury,
but he waited for the Thursday, the proper day for witchcraft.
Herodes's wife was horse-riding that night,
and with her went the witches, and with her the Abyss.
So he waited that night, already savoring the duck.

== See also ==
- Sicco Polenton, Renaissance poet from Padua
- Teofilo Folengo, Italian author of macaronic verse
