= Carmen Possum =

80-line Macaronic poem

Carmen Possum is a popular 80-line macaronic poem written in a mix of Latin and English and dating to the 19th century. Its author is unknown, but the poem's theme and language enable one to surmise that he or she was from the United States of America and was either a teacher or at least a student of Latin.

The title is a multilingual pun: it could be taken to mean "I Can Sing" in Latin ("Carmen" meaning "song" and "Possum" meaning "I can"), but, as revealed in the text, it is supposed to mean "Song of the Opossum" (with "Possum" referring to the animal). However, both interpretations violate Latin grammar—"Carmen Possum" would not correctly translate to either phrase in proper Latin.

The poem humorously blends Latin declensions and conjugations with English words, creating absurd yet memorable phrases such as "turnus" (a pseudo-Latinized version of "turn") and "trunkum longum" (a nonsensical Latinized form of "long trunk"). This playful mixing of languages makes it a useful mnemonic tool for Latin students.

Beyond its educational value, Carmen Possum has been referenced in academic discussions on macaronic literature and language pedagogy. Its whimsical nature has also led to adaptations and performances in schools and Latin clubs.

The poem can be used as a pedagogical device for elementary Latin teaching. The language mix includes vocabulary, morphology (turnus) and grammar (trunkum longum).

In music, Carmen Possum is also the title of an unpublished choral work by American composer Normand Lockwood (1906–2002). Written in 1941, Lockwood's composition sets the Latin-English text to music, blending classical and humorous elements.

== Publication history ==
An early version of the poem, with different words, a couple extra lines, and divided into four sections and titled Tale of a 'Possum, appeared in a Michigan University publication dated 1867, where it is attributed to Wheaton College. That same version later appeared in an 1886 issue of the University of Virginia magazine Virginia Spectator, with the title The Tale of a 'Possum; the editors inquired of readers as to the poem's authorship.

A version closer to the modern version, attributed to a "Prof. W. W. Legare" of northern Georgia and dated to the 1850s, was featured in a 1914 periodical.

== The poem (modern version) ==
The translation on the right captures the intended reading of each verse.

Carmen Possum

The nox was lit by lux of Luna,
And 'twas a nox most opportuna
To catch a possum or a coona;
For nix was scattered o'er this mundus,
A shallow nix, et non profundus.
On sic a nox with canis unus,
Two boys went out to hunt for coonus.
The corpus of this bonus canis
Was full as long as octo span is,
But brevior legs had canis never
Quam had hic dog; et bonus clever.
Some used to say, in stultum jocum
Quod a field was too small locum
For sic a dog to make a turnus
Circum self from stem to sternus.
Unus canis, duo puer,
Nunquam braver, nunquam truer,
Quam hoc trio nunquam fuit,
If there was I never knew it.
This bonus dog had one bad habit,
Amabat much to tree a rabbit,
Amabat plus to chase a rattus,
Amabat bene tree a cattus.
But on this nixy moonlight night
This old canis did just right.
Nunquam treed a starving rattus,
Nunquam chased a starving cattus,
But sucurrit on, intentus
On the track and on the scentus,
Till he trees a possum strongum,
In a hollow trunkum longum.
Loud he barked in horrid bellum,
Seemed on terra vehit pellum. (Note: The earliest versions have "vehit hellum" instead. ("carried a hell"))
Quickly ran the duo puer
Mors of possum to secure.
Quam venerit, one began
To chop away like quisque man.
Soon the axe went through the truncum
Soon he hit it all kerchunkum;
Combat deepens, on ye braves! (Note: An allusion to the Thomas Campbell poem Hohenlinden, which features the line "Combat deepens; on ye brave"; early versions have bravus rhyming with stavus instead of braves and staves.)
Canis, pueri et staves
As his powers non longius carry,
Possum potest non pugnare.
On the nix his corpus lieth.
Down to Hades spirit flieth,
Joyful pueri, canis bonus,
Think him dead as any stonus. (Note: In the earliest versions, this line is followed by Ain't his corpus like a jelly? Quid plus proof ought hunter velle?)
Now they seek their pater's domo,
Feeling proud as any homo,
Knowing, certe, they will blossom
Into heroes, when with possum
They arrive, narrabunt story,
Plenus blood et plenior glory.
Pompey, David, Samson, Caesar,
Cyrus, Black Hawk, Shalmanezer!
Tell me where est now the gloria,
Where the honors of victoria? (Note: The earliest versions capitalize "victoria" but not "gloria", implying that this line was meant to refer to Queen Victoria.)
Nunc a domum narrent story,
Plenus sanguine, tragic, gory.
Pater praiseth, likewise mater,
Wonders greatly younger frater.
Possum leave they on the mundus, (Note: One early version had "Possum leave they, dead as Dundas" instead.)
Go themselves to sleep profundus,
Somniunt possums slain in battle,
Strong as ursae, large as cattle.
When nox gives way to lux of morning,
Albam terram much adorning,
Up they jump to see the varmin,
Of the which this is the carmen.
Lo! possum est resurrectum!
Ecce pueri dejectum,
Ne relinquit back behind him,
Et the pueri never find him.
Cruel possum! bestia vilest,
How the pueros thou beguilest!
Pueri think non plus of Caesar,
Go ad Orcum, Shalmanezer,
Take your laurels, cum the honor,
Since ista possum is a goner!

Translation:

Song of the Opossum

The night was lit by the light of the Moon,
And it was a most opportune night
To catch a possum or a coon;
For snow was scattered over this world,
A shallow snow, and not deep.
On such a night with one dog,
Two boys went out to hunt for coons.
The body of this good dog
Was as long as eight spans,
But no dog ever had shorter legs
Than this one; and he was clever.
Some used to say, in a silly joke,
That a field was too small a place
For such a dog to make a turn
Around himself from stem to stern.
One dog, two boys,
Never braver, never truer,
Than this trio ever was,
If there was, I never knew it.
This good dog had one bad habit,
He loved much to tree a rabbit,
He loved more to chase a rat,
He loved well to tree a cat.
But on this snowy moonlight night
This old dog did just right.
Never treed a starving rat,
Never chased a starving cat,
But ran on, intent
On the track and on the scent,
Until he treed a strong possum,
In a long hollow trunk.
Loud he barked in a horrible battle,
It seemed on earth he carried a skin.
Quickly ran the two boys
To secure the death of the possum.
When they arrived, one began
To chop away like every man.
Soon the axe went through the trunk,
Soon he hit it with a loud crash;
Combat deepens, on ye brave!
Dog, boys, and sticks
As his powers no longer carry,
Possum can no longer fight.
On the snow his body lies.
Down to Hades his spirit flies,
Joyful boys, good dog,
Think him dead as any stone. (Note: In the earliest versions, this line is followed by Ain't his body like a jelly? What more proof does a hunter need?)
Now they seek their father's house,
Feeling proud as any man,
Knowing, certainly, they will blossom
Into heroes, when with possum
They arrive, they will tell the story,
Full of blood and even fuller of glory.
Pompey, David, Samson, Caesar,
Cyrus, Black Hawk, Shalmanezer!
Tell me where is now the glory,
Where the honors of victory?
Now at home they tell the story,
Full of blood, tragic, gory.
Father praises, likewise mother,
Greatly wonders younger brother.
They leave the possum on the ground,
They go themselves to deep sleep,
They dream of possums slain in battle,
Strong as bears, large as cattle.
When night gives way to morning light,
White earth much adorning,
Up they jump to see the varmint,
Of which this is the song.
Lo! possum is resurrected!
Behold the boys are dejected,
He did not leave behind him,
And the boys never find him.
Cruel possum! vilest beast,
How you deceive the boys!
Boys think no more of Caesar,
Go to Hell, Shalmanezer,
Take your laurels, with the honor,
Since this possum is a goner!

== Summary in prose ==
The poem chronicles the adventures of two boys who go out hunting for an opossum or raccoon on a snowy night, with their Dachshund dog. Although the dog was often mocked for its disproportionate length ("eight spans", or seventy inches) and love of chasing rabbits, cats, and rats, it performs flawlessly on the night, chasing an opossum into a long, hollow log.

The boys run quickly to secure their prey, chopping away at the log to get hold of it. They go back home, leaving the dead opossum on the ground. They proudly tell the story, which is said by the author to dwarf the feats of Pompey, Samson, Julius Caesar, Cyrus the Great, and other great military leaders of antiquity, as well as of American Indian chief Black Hawk; winning the praise of their parents and admiration of their younger brother. They go to sleep, dreaming of opossums as strong as bears and as large as cattle. Early the next morning, the two boys go to see their catch, but cannot find it. The "vile possum" had tricked them by playing dead—as opossums do when threatened and cornered. The kids never find the opossum again, and feel dejected.

== Analysis ==
=== Title ===
While carmen possum may sound like a Latin phrase, it is grammatically incorrect. The closest interpretation, satisfying (if only barely) the requirements of syntax, would be "I am capable of song" (with "of" here constituting not a stand-alone preposition but rather a portion of an English phrasal verb).

However, as the text reveals ("Up they jump to see the varmin / Of the which this is the carmen"), the title itself is a macaronic mix of Latin and English, and should be understood as "Song of [the] Opossum". Yet, the noun "possum", if it were a Latin word, should be in the genitive case (possi) rather than the nominative (possum). Although one could assume that possum is an indeclinable noun.

=== Poem structure ===
The poem is written from a third-person omniscient perspective in a rhyming mix of trochaic tetrameter and iambic tetrameter, with turns of phrase satirising Homerian epic.

== See also ==
- The Talents (c. 1460), a play containing a macaronic Middle English/Latin text.
- The Motor Bus (1914), a macaronic English/Latin poem by Alfred Denis Godley.
- Dog Latin
