= Macaronic language =

Text using a mixture of languages

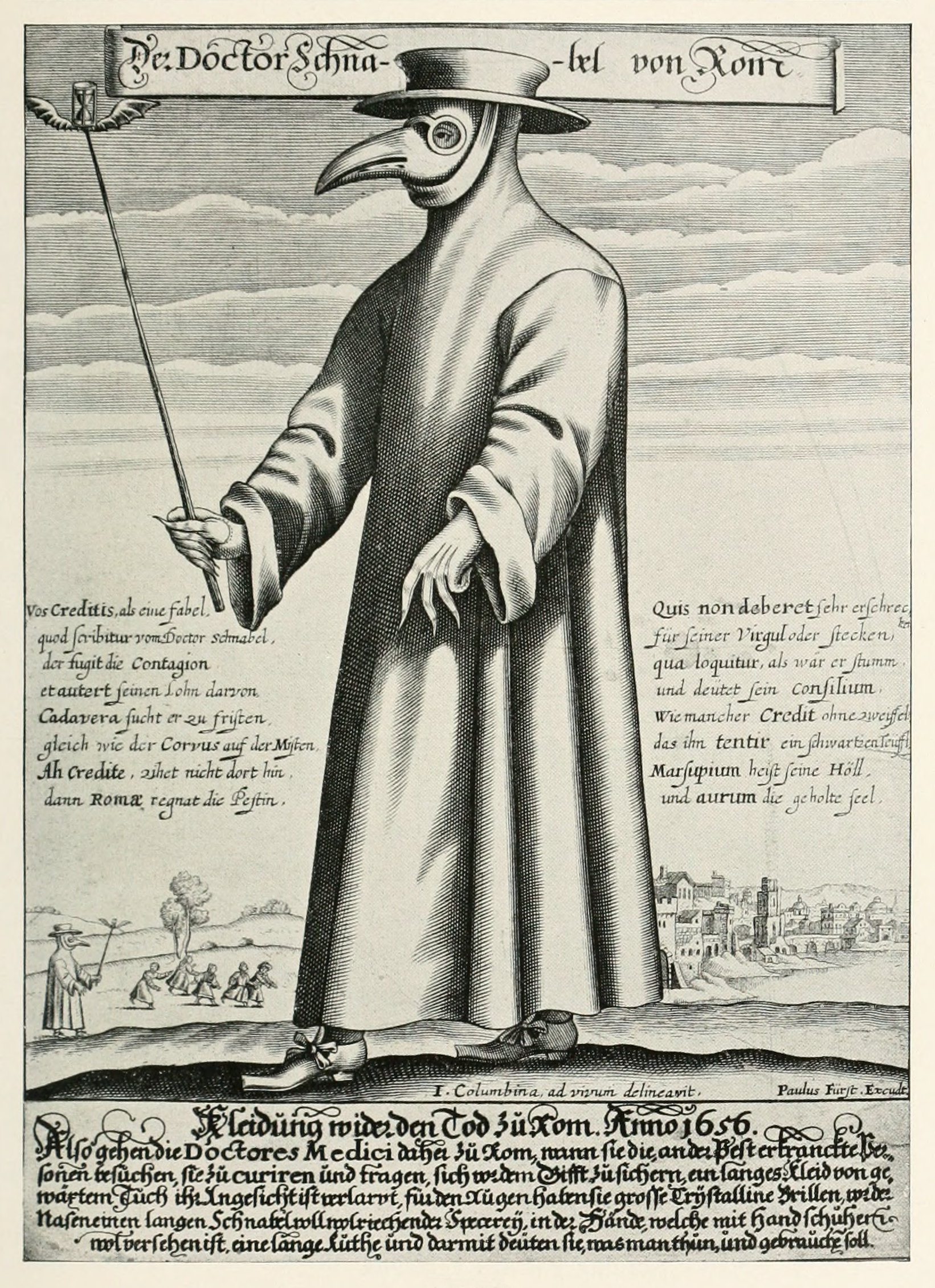
Copper engraving of Doctor Schnabel [i.e. Dr. Beak] (a caricature of a plague doctor in 17th-century Rome) with a satirical macaronic poem ("Vos Creditis, als eine Fabel, / quod scribitur vom Doctor Schnabel")

Macaronic language is any expression using a mixture of languages, particularly bilingual puns or situations in which the languages are otherwise used in the same context (rather than simply discrete segments of a text being in different languages). Hybrid words are effectively "internally macaronic". In spoken language, code-switching is using more than one language or dialect within the same conversation.

Macaronic Latin in particular is a jumbled jargon made up of vernacular words given Latin endings or of Latin words mixed with the vernacular in a pastiche (compare dog Latin).

The word macaronic comes from the Neo-Latin macaronicus, which is from the Italian maccarone, or 'dumpling', regarded as coarse peasant fare. It is generally derogatory and used when the mixing of languages has a humorous or satirical intent or effect but is sometimes applied to more serious mixed-language literature.

== History ==
=== Mixed Latin-vernacular lyrics in medieval Europe ===
Texts that mixed Latin and vernacular language apparently arose throughout Europe at the end of the Middle Ages—a time when Latin was still the working language of scholars, clerics and university students, but was losing ground to the vernacular among poets, minstrels and storytellers.

An early example is from 1130, in the Gospel book of Munsterbilzen Abbey. The following sentence mixes late Old Dutch and Latin:

Tesi samanunga was edele unde scona
et omnium virtutum pleniter plena

Translated: This community was noble and pure, and completely full of all virtues.

The Carmina Burana (collected c.1230) contains several poems mixing Latin with Medieval German or French. Another well-known example is the first stanza of the famous carol In Dulci Jubilo, whose original version (written around 1328) had Latin mixed with German, with a hint of Greek. While some of those early works had a clear humorous intent, many use the language mix for lyrical effect.

Another early example is in the Middle English recitals The Towneley Plays (c.1460). In The Talents (play 24), Pontius Pilate delivers a rhyming speech in mixed English and Latin.

A number of English political poems in the 14th century alternated (Middle) English and Latin lines, such as in MS Digby 196:

The taxe hath tened [ruined] vs alle,
Probat hoc mors tot validorum
The Kyng þerof had small
fuit in manibus cupidorum.
yt had ful hard hansell,
dans causam fine dolorum;
vengeaunce nedes most fall,
propter peccata malorum
(etc)

Several anthems also contain both Latin and English. In the case of 'Nolo mortem peccatoris' by Thomas Morley, the Latin is used as a refrain:

Nolo mortem peccatoris; Haec sunt verba Salvatoris.
Father I am thine only Son, sent down from heav’n mankind to save.
Father, all things fulfilled and done according to thy will, I have.
Father, my will now all is this: Nolo mortem peccatoris.
Father, behold my painful smart, taken for man on ev’ry side;
Ev'n from my birth to death most tart, no kind of pain I have denied,
but suffered all, and all for this: Nolo mortem peccatoris.

Translated: "'I do not wish the death of the wicked'; These are the words of the Saviour." An allusion to John 3:17 and 2 Peter 3:9.

The Scottish Chaucerian William Dunbar's Lament for the Makaris uses as a refrain for every four-line stanza the phrase from the Office of the Dead "Timor mortis conturbat me" ["The fear of death disturbs me"].

=== Latin–Italian macaronic verse ===
The term macaronic is believed to have originated in Padua in the late 15th century, apparently from maccarona, a kind of pasta or dumpling eaten by peasants at that time. (That is also the presumed origin of maccheroni.) Its association with the genre comes from the Macaronea, a comical poem by Tifi Odasi in mixed Latin and Italian, published in 1488 or 1489. Another example of the genre is Tosontea by Corrado of Padua, which was published at about the same time as Tifi's Macaronea.

Tifi and his contemporaries clearly intended to satirize the broken Latin used by many doctors, scholars and bureaucrats of their time. While this "macaronic Latin" (macaronica verba) could be due to ignorance or carelessness, it could also be the result of its speakers trying to make themselves understood by the vulgar folk without resorting to their speech.

An important and unusual example of mixed-language text is the Hypnerotomachia Poliphili of Francesco Colonna (1499), which was basically written using Italian syntax and morphology, but using a made-up vocabulary based on roots from Latin, Greek, and occasionally others. However, while the Hypnerotomachia is contemporary with Tifi's Macaronea, its mixed language is not used for plain humor, but rather as an aesthetic device to underscore the fantastic but refined nature of the book.

Tifi's Macaronea was a popular success, and the writing of humorous texts in macaronic Latin became a fad in the 16th and 17th centuries, particularly in Italian, but also in many other European languages. An important Italian example was Baldo by Teofilo Folengo, who described his own verses as "a gross, rude, and rustic mixture of flour, cheese, and butter".

=== Other mixed-language lyrics ===
Macaronic verse is especially common in cultures with widespread bilingualism or language contact, such as Ireland before the middle of the nineteenth century. Macaronic traditional songs such as Siúil A Rúin are quite common in Ireland. In Scotland, macaronic songs have been popular among Highland immigrants to Glasgow, using English and Scottish Gaelic as a device to express the alien nature of the anglophone environment. An example:

When I came down to Glasgow first,
a-mach air Tìr nan Gall.
I was like a man adrift,
air iomrall 's dol air chall.
[...]

translation:
When I came down to Glasgow first,
down to the Lowlands (lit. "out to the land of foreigners").
I was like a man adrift,
astray and lost.

Folk and popular music of the Andes frequently alternates between Spanish and the given South American language of its region of origin.

Some Classical Persian poems were written with alternating Persian and Arabic verses or hemistichs, most famously by Saadi and Hafez. Such poems were called molamma' (ملمع, literally "speckled", plural molamma‘āt ملمعات), Residing in Anatolia, in some of his poems Rumi mixed Persian with Arabic as well as the local languages of Turkish and Greek.

Macaronic verse was also common in medieval India, where the influence of the Muslim rulers led to poems being written in alternating indigenous Hindi and the Persian language. This style was used by poet Amir Khusro and played a major role in the rise of the Urdu or Hindustani language.

== Modern macaronic literature ==
=== Prose ===
Macaronic text is still used by modern Italian authors, e.g. by Carlo Emilio Gadda and Beppe Fenoglio. Other examples are provided by the character Salvatore in Umberto Eco's The Name of the Rose, and the peasant hero of his Baudolino. Dario Fo's Mistero Buffo ("Comic Mystery Play") features grammelot sketches using language with macaronic elements.

The 2001 novel The Last Samurai by Helen DeWitt includes portions of Japanese, Classical Greek, and Inuktitut, although the reader is not expected to understand the passages that are not in English.

Macaronic games are used by the literary group Oulipo in the form of interlinguistic homophonic transformation: replacing a known phrase with homophones from another language. The archetypal example is by François Le Lionnais, who transformed John Keats' "A thing of beauty is a joy forever" into "Un singe de beauté est un jouet pour l'hiver": 'A monkey of beauty is a toy for the winter'. Another example is the book Mots d'Heures: Gousses, Rames: The d'Antin Manuscript.

Macaronisms figure prominently in The Trilogy by the Polish novelist Henryk Sienkiewicz, and are one of the major compositional principles for James Joyce's novel Finnegans Wake.

In Michael Flynn's science fiction novels of the Spiral Arm series, a massive interplanetary exodus from all Earth language groups has led to star system settlements derived from random language and culture admixtures. At the time of the novels' setting, several hundred years later, each planet has developed a macaronic pidgin, several of which are used for all the dialogs in the books.

=== Poetry ===
Two well-known examples of non-humorous macaronic verse are Byron's Maid of Athens, ere we part (1810, in English with a Greek refrain); and Pearsall's translation of the carol In Dulci Jubilo (1837, in mixed English and Latin verse).

An example of modern humorous macaronic verse is the anonymous English/Latin poem Carmen Possum ("The Opossum's Song"), which is sometimes used as a teaching and motivational aid in elementary Latin language classes. Other similar examples are The Motor Bus by A. D. Godley, and the anonymous Up I arose in verno tempore.

Ezra Pound's The Cantos makes use of Chinese, Greek, Latin, and Italian, among other languages.

Recent examples are the mużajki or 'mosaics' (2007) of Maltese poet Antoine Cassar mixing English, Spanish, Maltese, Italian, and French; works of Italian writer Guido Monte; and the late poetry of Ivan Blatný combining Czech with English.

Brian P. Cleary's "What Can I C'est?" makes use of macaronic verse, as do other poems in his book Rainbow Soup: Adventures in Poetry:

My auntie Michelle is big in the BON
(As well as the hip and the thigh).
And when she exhales, OUI haul out our sails
And ride on the wind of VERSAILLES.

A whole body of comic verse exists created by John O'Mill, pseudonym of Johan van der Meulen, a teacher of English at the Rijks HBS (State Grammar School), Breda, the Netherlands. These are in a mixture of English and Dutch, often playing on common mistakes made when translating from the latter to the former.

=== Theatre ===
The finale of act 1 of Gilbert and Sullivan's Savoy Opera Iolanthe has several instances of humorous macaronic verse.

First, the three lords mix Italian and Latin phrases into their discussion of Iolanthe's age:

Lord Mountararat: This gentleman is seen, / With a maid of seventeen, / A-taking of his dolce far niente...

Lord Chancellor: Recollect yourself, I pray, / And be careful what you say- / As the ancient Romans said, festina lente...
Lord Tolloller: I have often had a use / For a thorough-bred excuse / Of a sudden (which is English for repente)...

Lord Mountararat: Now, listen, pray to me, / For this paradox will be / Carried, nobody at all contradicente...

Then, the chorus of peers sing macaronic verse as they attempt to resist the fairies' powers:

Our lordly style you shall not quench with base canaille! (That word is French.)

Distinction ebbs before a herd of vulgar plebs! (A Latin word.)
Twould fill with joy and madness stark the oι πoλλoί! (A Greek remark.)

One Latin word, one Greek remark, and one that's French.

== In popular culture ==
=== Film ===
"Macaronisms" are frequently used in films, especially comedies. In Charlie Chaplin's anti-war comedy The Great Dictator, the title character speaks English mixed with a parody of German (e.g. "Cheese-und-cracken"). This was also used by Benzino Napaloni, the parody character of Benito Mussolini, using Italian foods (such as salami and ravioli) as insults.

Other movies featuring macaronic language are the Italian historical comedies L'armata Brancaleone and Brancaleone at the Crusades (d. Mario Monicelli), which mix modern and medieval Italian as well as Latin (sometimes in rhyme, and sometimes with regional connotations, such as the Italo-Normans using words from modern Sicilian).

=== Television ===
On Saturday Night Live, the character, Opera Man, played by Adam Sandler, would often sing snippets using Macaronic language.

=== Song ===
A macaronic song is one that combines multiple languages. Macaronic songs have been particularly common in Ireland (Irish–English) and also occur for other languages, such as Yiddish–Ukrainian.

Macaronic language appearing in popular songs include Rammstein's "Amerika" (German and English), the Beatles' "Michelle", Talking Heads' "Psycho Killer" and The Weeknd's "Montreal" (French and English), The Clash's "Spanish Bombs", José Feliciano's "Feliz Navidad" (Spanish and English), Bandolero's "Paris Latino", Magazine 60's "Don Quichotte (No Están Aquí)", and JJ Lin's "只對你說 (Sarang Heyo)" (Mandarin, English, and Korean).

== See also ==
- List of macaronic languages
- Blinkenlights, a macaronic (German/English) warning sign
- "Boar's Head Carol", Christmas carol in English/Latin language
- Contemporary Latin
- Creole language
- Dog Latin
- Faux Cyrillic
- Hiberno-Latin
- Loanword
- Grammelot
- Gibberish
- Slang
- Diglossia
- Lorem ipsum, scrambled Latin used as a placeholder text in print/media
- Mater si, magistra no
- Nadsat, a fictional English/Russian language, from the novel A Clockwork Orange
- Phono-semantic matching
- Pidgin
- Surzhyk
- Timor mortis conturbat me
- UEFA Champions League Anthem
- National anthem of South Africa
- Swiss Psalm
- La Brabançonne
