= Andrew Steinmann =

American professor of theology and Hebrew

Andrew E. Steinmann
- Born: May 29, 1954 (age 72); Cincinnati, Ohio
- Occupations: Professor, author
- Title: Distinguished Professor of Theology and Hebrew Emeritus

Academic background
- Education: University of Cincinnati, Concordia Theological Seminary
- Alma mater: University of Michigan

Academic work
- Discipline: Biblical studies
- Sub-discipline: Old Testament/Hebrew Bible, Biblical Hebrew, and Biblical Aramaic
- Institutions: Concordia University Chicago

Andrew E. Steinmann was Distinguished Professor of Theology and Hebrew at Concordia University Chicago. He has authored twenty books and numerous articles relating to Old Testament/Hebrew Bible, Biblical Hebrew, and Biblical Aramaic. His publications include books on the Old Testament canon, biblical chronology, Hebrew and Aramaic grammar, and commentaries on several Old Testament books. He retired from teaching in 2023.

== Biography ==
Steinmann attended the University of Cincinnati, graduating with a B. S. in Chemical Engineering. He pursued studies to enter the ministry of the Lutheran Church – Missouri Synod, receiving a M. Div. from Concordia Theological Seminary in Ft. Wayne, Indiana. Subsequently he served as associate pastor of St. John Lutheran Church, Fraser, Michigan, and later assistant professor at Concordia University in Ann Arbor, Michigan. During this time he received a PhD in Near Eastern Studies at the University of Michigan. Steinmann was translation coordinator for the God's Word Translation of the Bible, and currently serves on the Translation Oversight Committee for the Christian Standard Bible. He also served as staff pastor at Lutheran Home in Westlake, Ohio, before he accepted a position at Concordia University Chicago. Steinmann retired from teaching in May 2023, but he remains an active scholar.

Steinmann serves as a regular guest on the radio programs "Issues, Etc." and "The Bible Study" on KFUO in St. Louis, and has also been a guest on "Our World, His View" on WLQV in Detroit and "Studio A" on KFUO.

== Major publications ==
In The Oracles of God: The Old Testament Canon, Steinmann reviewed the evidence for the history of the compilation and organization of the Hebrew Bible. Among his major conclusions were that the canon existed as a collection from before the time of Christ, that it was originally considered to be a collection of authoritative and divinely inspired books kept in the temple in Jerusalem, and that the later Jewish and Christian organizations of the canon were developments from a more simple two-part organization of Law (Pentateuch) and Prophets.

Steinmann has also published several works relating to chronology of the Bible, especially From Abraham to Paul: A Biblical Chronology. He has challenged the consensus on the date of the death of Herod the Great, arguing that Herod died in 1 BC. With Rodger Young he has also argued that the source of the information on the Parian Chronicle was most likely the city records of Athens.

== Publications ==
=== Books ===
- Steinmann, Andrew E. (1999). The Oracles of God: The Old Testament Canon. St. Louis, MO: Concordia Publishing House. ISBN 9780570042822. OCLC 41311302.
- ———; Bartelt, Andrew H. (2004). Fundamental Biblical Hebrew. St. Louis, MO: Concordia Publishing House. ISBN 9780758605283. OCLC 464194417.
- ——— (2004). Is God Listening: making prayer a part of your life. St. Louis, MO: Concordia Publishing House. ISBN 9780758606129. OCLC 54857571.
- ———; Bartelt, Andrew H. (2006). Workbook and Supplementary Exercises for Fundamental Biblical Hebrew and Fundamental Biblical Aramaic. St. Louis, MO: Concordia Academic Press. ISBN 9780758606907. OCLC 649705857.
- ——— (2008). Daniel. Concordia Commentary. St. Louis, MO: Concordia Publishing House. ISBN 9780758606952. OCLC 183609801.
- ——— (2009). Proverbs. Concordia Commentary. St. Louis, MO: Concordia Publishing House. ISBN 9780758603203. OCLC 298670833.
- ——— (2010). Intermediate Biblical Hebrew: A Reference Grammar with Charts and Exercises. St. Louis, MO: Concordia Publishing House. ISBN 9780758625168. OCLC 720027375.
- ——— (2010). Ezra and Nehemiah. Concordia Commentary. St. Louis, MO: Concordia Publishing House. ISBN 9780758615961. OCLC 434613451.
- ——— (2011). From Abraham to Paul: A Biblical Chronology. St. Louis, MO: Concordia Publishing House. ISBN 9780758627995. OCLC 701330696.
- ———; Lessing, R. Reed (2013). Prepare the Way of The Lord: An Introduction to the Old Testament. St. Louis, MO: Concordia Publishing House.
- Steinmann, Andrew E. (2016). 1 Samuel. St. Louis: Concordia Publishing House. ISBN 9780758606945.
- Steinmann, Andrew (2017). 2 Samuel. St. Louis: Concordia Publishing House. ISBN 9780758650061.
- Steinmann, Andrew E. (2019). Genesis: An Introduction and Commentary. Cambridge, UK: InterVarsity. ISBN 9780830842513.
- Lessing, R. Reed; Steinmann, Andrew E. (2023). The Messianic Message: Predictions, Patterns, and Presence in the Old Testament. St. Louis: Concordia Publishing House. ISBN 9780758670441.

=== Edited by ===
- ———, ed. (2006). Called to Be God's People: An Introduction to the Old Testament. Called by the Gospel. Vol. 1. Eugene, OR: Wipf & Stock. ISBN 9781597525534. OCLC 76693889.
- Steinmann, Andrew (2023). ESV Chronological Bible. Wheaton, IL: Crossway.

=== Journal articles ===
- ——— (1992). "The Tripartite Structure of the Sixth Seal, Trumpet and Bowl of St. John's Apocalypse". Journal of the Evangelical Theological Society. 35: 69–79.
- ——— (1992). "The Order of Amos' Oracles Against the Nations: Amos 1:3—2: 16". Journal of Biblical Literature. 11: 671–677.
- ——— (1996). "The Structure and Message of the Book of Job". Vetus Testamentum. 46: 85–100. doi:10.1163/1568533962581035.
- ——— (1997). "Jacob's Family Goes to Egypt: Varying Portraits of Unity and Disunity in the Textual Traditions of Exodus 1:1–5". TC: A Journal of Biblical Textual Criticism.
- ——— (2000). "Proverbs 1—9 As a Solomonic Composition". Journal of the Evangelical Theological Society. 43: 659–674.
- ——— (2001). "Three Things...Four Things... Seven Things: The Coherence of Proverbs 30:11–33 and the Unity of Proverbs 30". Hebrew Studies. 42: 59–66. doi:10.1353/hbr.2001.0025. S2CID 170717196.
- ——— (2002). "אחד As an Ordinal Number and the Meaning of Genesis 1:5". Journal of the Evangelical Theological Society. 45: 577–584.
- ——— (2002). "The Chicken and the Egg: A New Proposal for the Relationship Between the Prayer of Nabonidus and the Book of Daniel". Revue de Qumran. 20: 557–570.
- ——— (2005). "The Mysterious Numbers of the Book of Judges". Journal of the Evangelical Theological Society. 48: 491–500.
- ——— (2005). "Is the Anti-Christ in Daniel 11?". Bibliotheca Sacra. 162: 195–209.
- Steinmann, Andrew; Eschelbach, Michael (2006). "Walk this Way: A Theme from Proverbs Reflected and Extended in Paul's Letters". Concordia Theological Quarterly. 70: 43–62.
- Steinmann, Andrew E. (2007). "Using the English Standard Version: A Few Notes of Caution". Lutheran Education Journal. 141: 113–123.
- ——— (2008). "Letters of Kings About Votive Offerings, The God of Israel and The Aramaic Document". Journal of Hebrew Scriptures.
- ——— (2008). "A Chronological Note: The Return of the Exiles under Sheshbazzar and Zerubbabel (Ezra 1—2)". Journal of the Evangelical Theological Society. 51: 513–522.
- ——— (2009). "When did the Great Herod Reign". Novum Testamentum. 51 (1): 1–29. doi:10.1163/156853608X245953.
- ——— (2011). "Night and Day, Evening and Morning". The Bible Translator. 62: 154–160.
- Young, Rodger C.; Steinmann, Andrew E. (2012). "Correlation of Select Classical Sources Related to the Trojan War with Assyrian and Biblical Chronologies". Journal for the Evangelical Study of the Old Testament. 1 (2). Wipf and Stock: 223–248.
- Steinmann, Andrew E. (2013). "Gazelles, Does, and Flames: (De)Limiting Love in Song of Songs". Journal for the Evangelical Study of the Old Testament. 2 (1): 25–39.
- Steinmann, Andrew (2014). "What Did David Understand about the Promises in the Davidic Covenant". Bibliotheca Sacra. 171: 19–29.
- Steinmann, Andrew E. (2017). "Jesus and Possessing the Enemies' Gates (Genesis 22:17-18; 24:60)". Bibliotheca Sacra. 174: 13–21.
- Steinmann, Andrew E. (2017). "Gaps in the Genealogies in Genesis 5 and 11?". Bibliotheca Sacra. 174 (2): 141–158.
- Steinmann, Andrew E. (2016–2017). "A Note on the Refrain in Genesis 1: Evening, Morning, and Day as Chronological Summary". Journal for the Evangelical Study of the Old Testament. 5 (2): 125–140.
- ——— (2017). "Challenging the Authenticity of Cainan, Son of Arpachsad". Journal of the Evangelical Theological Society. 60: 697–711.
- Steinmann, Andrew E. (2018). "A Reply to Jeremy Sexton Regarding the Genealogies in Genesis". Journal of the Evangelical Theological Society. 61: 27–37.
- Steinmann, Andrew (2019). "The Role of the Philistines in the Establishment of the Israelite Monarchy". Journal of Biblical and Theological Studies. 4: 42–54.
- Steinmann, Andrew E. (2019). "Genesis Genealogies and the Messianic Promise". Bibliotheca Sacra. 176: 343–359.
- Steinmann, Andrew E.; Young, Rodger C. (2019). "Caligula's Statue for the Jerusalem Temple and Its Relation to the Chronology of Herod the Great". Journal of the Evangelical Theological Society. 62: 759–774.
- Steinmann, Andrew E. (2021). "A Comparison of the Text of Genesis in Three Traditions: Masoretic Text, Samaritan Pentateuch, Septuagint". Journal of the Evangelical Theological Society. 64: 25–43.
- Steinmann, Andrew E.; Young, Rodger C. (2020). "Elapsed Times for Herod the Great in Josephus". Bibliotheca Sacra. 177: 308–328.
- Steinmann, Andrew E.; Young, Rodger C. (2020). "Consular Years and Sabbatical Years in the Life of Herod the Great". Bibliotheca Sacra. 177: 442–461.
- Steinmann, Andrew E. (2021). "The D Stem in Biblical Hebrew: Meaning and Exegetical Implications". Journal for the Evangelical Study of the Old Testament. 70 (2): 113–146.
- Steinmann, Andrew E. (2021). "He Is Like a Tree: Arboreal Imagery for Humans in Biblical Wisdom Literature". Religions. 12 (10): 804. doi:10.3390/rel12100804.
- Steinmann, Andrew E. (2022). "Did It Take Forty-Six Years or More to Build the Temple in Jerusalem?". Journal of the Evangelical Theological Society. 65 (2): 319–331.
- Steinmann, Andrew E. (2022). "Reckoning Tiberius's Reign and Jesus's Baptism: First- and Second-Century Evidence Concerning Tiberius's Fifteenth Year (Luke 3:1)". Tyndale Bulletin. 73: 91–118. doi:10.53751/001c.37789.
- Steinmann, Andrew E.; Young, Rodger C. (2021). "The Case for Antedating in the Reigns of Herod's Sons". Bibliotheca Sacra. 178: 436–455.
- Steinmann, Andrew E. (2023). "Research Note: On the Numbering and Teaching of the Decalogue". Concordia Theological Quarterly. 87: 353–357.
