= The Motor Bus =

Macaronic poem written in 1914 by Alfred Denis Godley

"The Motor Bus" is a macaronic poem by Alfred Denis Godley (1856–1925) written in 1914 in response to the introduction of motor buses in the city of Oxford. The poem pokes fun at the complexities of Latin grammar, treating the words "motor" and "bus" as though they were Latin nouns and declining them accordingly. Godley, a distinguished Classical scholar, wrote the poem during his tenure as Public Orator at the University of Oxford.

The poem's rhymes rely on the Latin words being read using the traditional English pronunciations, which were taught in British (and American) schools until well into the 20th century. "Motor" is treated as a noun of the third declension, while "bus" is treated as a noun of the second declension.

== Text ==
The case and number of the Latin forms are given after each repetition of the phrase "Motor Bus".

What is this that roareth thus?
Can it be a Motor Bus?
Yes, the smell and hideous hum
Indicat Motorem Bum!
Implet in the Corn and High
Terror me Motoris Bi:
Bo Motori clamitabo
Ne Motore caedar a Bo—
Dative be or Ablative
So thou only let us live:—
Whither shall thy victims flee?
Spare us, spare us, Motor Be!
Thus I sang; and still anigh
Came in hordes Motores Bi,
Et complebat omne forum
Copia Motorum Borum.
How shall wretches live like us
Cincti Bis Motoribus?
Domine, defende nos
Contra hos Motores Bos!

Translation:

What is this that roareth thus?
Can it be a Motor Bus? (nominative singular)
Yes, the smell and hideous hum
Indicate a Motor Bus! (accusative singular)
Terror of the Motor Bus (genitive singular)
Fills me in the Corn and High:
I will shout out to the Motor Bus (dative singular)
Lest I be killed by the Motor Bus— (ablative singular)
Dative be or Ablative
So thou only let us live:—
Whither shall thy victims flee?
Spare us, spare us, O Motor Bus! (vocative singular)
Thus I sang; and still anigh
Motor Buses came in hordes (nominative plural)
And the whole square was filled
With an abundance of Motor Buses. (genitive plural)
How shall wretches live like us
Surrounded by Motor Buses? (ablative plural)
O Lord, defend us
Against these Motor Buses! (accusative plural)

== Citations ==
The poem is quoted by Dorothy L. Sayers in her essay "The greatest single defect of my own Latin education" and other texts.

Taking inspiration from "The Motor Bus", Herbert H. Huxley wrote a Latin poem entitled "Mars Bar", which he dedicated to Godley:

Est praedulcis esu Mars-Bar.
Nil est cibo tuo, Mars, par.
Tune vis beatum larem?
Habe promptum Martem-Barem.
Captus dono Martis-Baris
Helenam liquisset Paris.
Dum natabunt ponto scari,
Dentur laudes Marti-Bari!

Translation:

The Mars Bar is very sweet to eat. (nominative singular)
Nothing rivals your food, Mars. (vocative singular)
Do you want a happy household?
Have to hand a Mars Bar. (accusative singular)
If he'd been seduced by the gift of a Mars Bar, (genitive singular)
Paris would have ditched Helen.
As long as fish swim in the sea,
Let praise be given to the Mars Bar! (dative singular)

Between mid-1957 and early 1960, J.R.R. Tolkien was inspired by the poem to write The Bovadium Fragments.

== See also ==
- Carmen Possum
- Dog Latin
