= Guido Monte =

Italian writer and poet (born 1962)

- Born: 1962; Palermo, Italy
- Died: 5 December 2017 (aged 54–55); Palermo
- Occupations: writer, poet, teacher
- Writing career
- Period: 2000–2017
- Genre: Poetry

Guido Monte (born 1962 - died 2017) was an Italian writer and poet. In his mature works, he employed linguistic blending in the search for meaningful and archetypal relations between distant cultures. His works and translations have been published by international magazines (as Words Without Borders, Swans Commentary, and Ars Interpres). On his blending experiments, he uses also Japanese, Sanskrit, Sheng and languages of ethnic groups in Kenya.

== Poetry and linguistic blending ==
On the way of Jorge Luis Borges, Ezra Pound's Cantos and T. S. Eliot's The Waste Land, Monte thinks that "…if we admit that some archetypal ideas are common among our planet inhabitants, then we can state, in the sense meant by Borges, that just one "Book" has been written, as an evidence of the original and permanent cultural unity of the world and it contains all the chaotic fragments ever thought and written by people searching for the deep truth of things...". Different languages can be approached and mixed "to transmit something that apparently is far in space and time" (on what was defined as a meta-communicative way). On this thinking, a blending author can "compose" poems and works without using his own verses, but only other poets' lines (and sometimes this is Monte's peculiarity), remembering every time, in the beginning, the names of the authors. On another experiment, in fact, Monte puts together, in a common archetypal idea, lines of Virgil, Dante and Blake. If Monte translates, for instance, the first verses of Genesis or any other holy texts in two or three languages, "…we realize that the new and different sounds, irrespective of our linguistic knowledge, suggest new, universal, cosmic vibrations that the original version didn't succeed in transmitting. In any case they reveal the complexity of reading different levels": In principio diviserunt Elohim / coelum et terram / and the land was left barren / et les ombres noires / enveloppaient les profondeurs / bade korgolòdei dar ruie / oghionusoh parmisad / et aura divina / super oceani undas (Genesis, Words Without Borders, 2004)

Alison Phipps, expert in Intercultural Studies, defines this form of blending as an embroidering gossamer.
In his latest experiments, on Swans Commentary, the visual coloured arrangement of verses (one colour for each one of the poem's selected authors) is important in conveying the intended effect of his multilingual works.

The French writer Orlando de Rudder, thinks that Monte's attempts are the beginning of a new "synthèse" des langues, a form of Babel Library where all the world poets live together, syncretistically, common universal feelings. The Italian writer Claudio Magris thinks that this kind of poetry is definable as meticciato organico (organic blending).

== Selected bibliography ==
- Tremila mondi in un solo istante di vita, ed. Della Battaglia, 2000
- Ultima lettera on Sergio Quinzio – profezie di un'esistenza, Rubbettino 2000, a cura di M. Iritano – authors: Gianni Vattimo, Umberto Galimberti, Claudio Magris, Guido Ceronetti, Erri De Luca, Gino Girolomoni, Guido Monte, Sergio Givone, Nynfa Bosco (about it, see: Stefano Serafini, Corporeità e sacro... EstOvest.net 2001)
- Leuconoe, Nuova Ipsa, 2004
- Il Niente richiamato all'esistenza (with Vittorio Cozzo), iraccontidiluvi.org, 2004
- Cosmopolitan multilingualism, Happa no kofu (Kawasaki, Tokyo), 2006
- Langues et mixité (Introduction de Marie Rennard), Annecy (France), 2007
- Viage. Per una "fenomenologia" metacomunicativa (with F. Saieva), Nuova Ipsa Editore, 2008

== Translations ==
- Palermo beat, by Patrick Waites, ed. della Battaglia 2000
- Si cela un ramo... Lucidamente.com, 2007
- Xenia I (from Satura) by Eugenio Montale, LanguageandCulture.net, 2007
- Bucolica IV, (18–22, The harmony) by Virgil, LanguageandCulture.net, 2007
- Pasolini: Fragments Of 1968, Swans-Commentary, 2008 (June 2, 2008 on swans.com)

== See also ==
- Modern Macaronic literature
- Antoine Cassar
- Joseph Campbell
- Words Without Borders
- (in Italian) Poesia multilingue
- Swans Commentary
