= Cypros (daughter of Herod) =

Cypros (fl. 1st century CE) was a member of the Herodian dynasty. She was a daughter of Herod the Great, born to one of his wives, Mariamne I. Mariamne I also bore another daughter, Cypros' sister, named Salampsio.

Cypros married Antipater IV, her first cousin (he was the son of Herod the Great's sister, Salome I). She gave birth to a daughter, also named Cypros, who eventually married Alexas Selcias.
