= Pheroras =

Youngest brother of Herod the Great

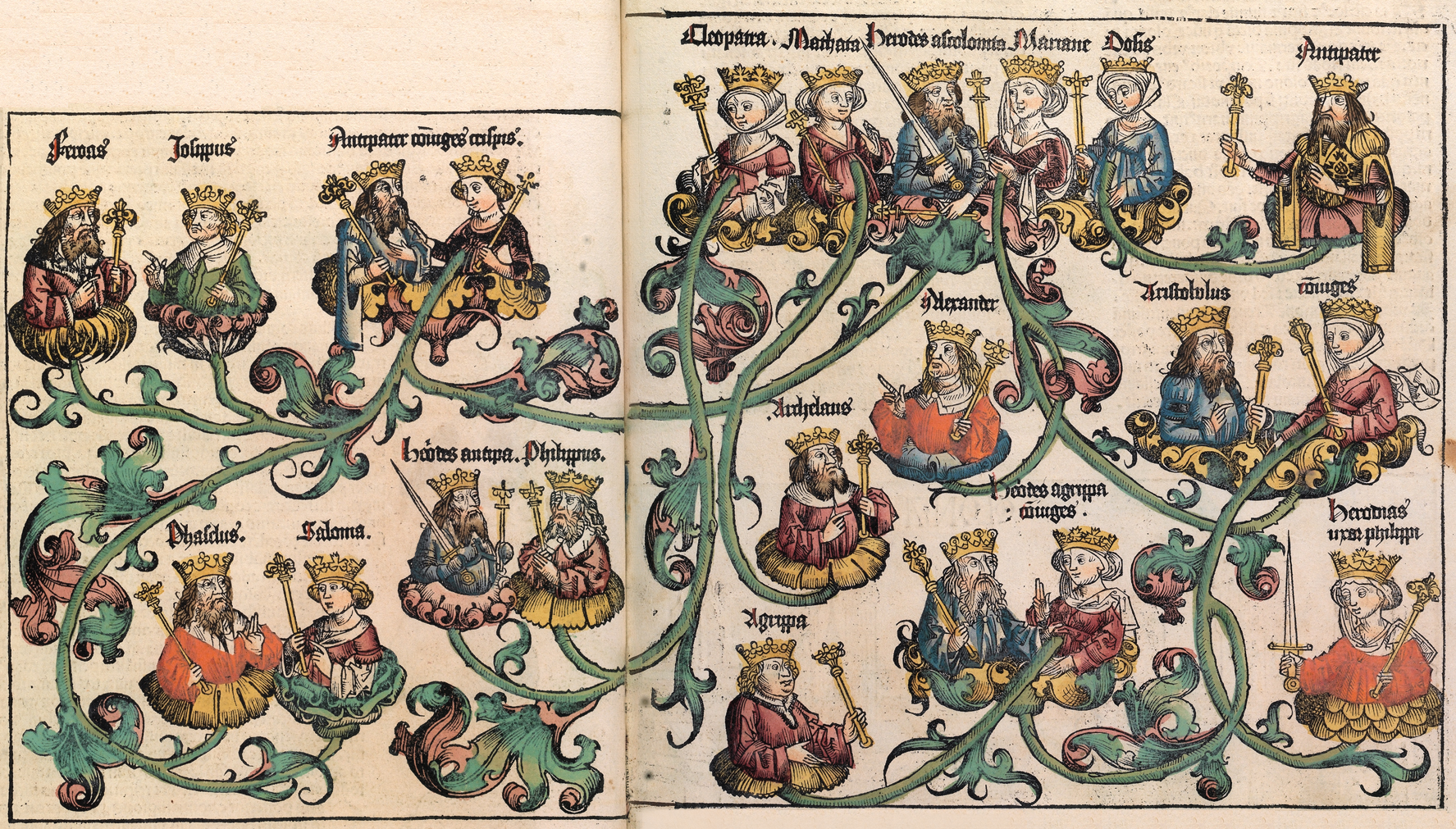
This is a part of a scan of an historical document: Schedelsche Weltchronik or Nuremberg Chronicle

Pheroras (Greek: Φερώρας; c. 68 BC–c. 5 BC), probably born in Marissa (Idumea), was the youngest son of Antipater I and his wife Cypros and younger brother of Herod the Great.

His first marriage was to a sister of Mariamne I (wife of Herod) which marriage was allegedly arranged by Herod. When this wife died, Herod betrothed him to his eldest daughter by Mariamne I, Salampsio, but because of an affection for a "slave girl", by whose "charms" he was "overcome", he rejected the marriage. Some time later Herod asked him to marry Salampsio's younger sister Cypros, and at first Pheroras agreed, but later he again refused and stayed married to his wife, who was very unpopular with Herod, and was involved in several plots against him.

Pheroras was a close comrade-in-arms of his brother Herod, on whose commission he restored the fortress of Alexandreum to the north of Jericho.
