= Herod the Great (play) =

The pageant of Magnus Herodes (Herod the Great) is the sixteenth of the pageants of the Wakefield/Towneley Cycle of medieval mystery plays. It occupies folios 55-60 of the unique manuscript of the cycle, Huntington MS HM 1. It is composed in the distinctive stanza-style rhyming associated by scholars with a putative poet known as the 'Wakefield Master'. In the assessment of Arthur Clare Cawley, 'the Wakefield playwright's skill in characterisation is nowhere better shown than in this pageant'. Like other tyrant characters in medieval drama, the protagonist of Herod the Great fictionalises the audience as his own subjects, and this pageant 'presents one of the most extended displays of this figure's interactive antics'.

== Summary ==
Herod the Great follows pageants depicting the visit of the Magi to the baby Jesus and the subsequent flight into Egypt of Mary, Joseph, and Jesus to avoid murder by King Herod the Great, who fears the prophecy that Jesus will become the King of the Jews. The play concerns the Massacre of the Innocents. After it comes the Purification of Mary, whose account of the presentation of Jesus at the Temple presents a scene of calm and joy in counterpoint to the action of Herod the Great.

Line numbering varies depending on whether editors edit the stanzas of the play as beginning with four long lines (giving a total stanza length of nine lines) or eight short lines (giving a total stanza length of thirteen lines).

| Lines (9-line stanzas) | Lines (13-line stanzas) | Events |
|---|---|---|
| 1-72 | 1-104 | At the palace of Herod, a messenger extols the power and glory of King Herod to the audience. |
| 73-144 | 105-208 | Herod rants at the audience, as though they were people in his court, about his anger that a child may become king of the Jews in his place, and that the Three Kings have not returned to his court, as they promised, to tell him where to find the child. |
| 145-96 | 209-284 | Herod converses with three soldiers. Herod blames them for letting the three kings get away and dismisses them. |
| 197-275 | 285-400 | Herod summons his counsellors, who cite Isaiah 7:14 as a prophecy of Jesus's birth, and recommend killing all infants of two years old and younger. |
| 276-324 | 401-67 | A messenger fetches the three soldiers, whom Herod instructs to kill the infants. |
| 325-414 | 468-599 | Elsewhere in Bethlehem, the three soldiers encounter three women, whose children they kill. The woman do their best to resist and lament their babies' slaughter. |
| 415-59 | 600-63 | The action returns to Herod's palace. Herod rewards the soldiers richly for their killings. |
| 460-513 | 664-741 | Herod addresses the audience, expressing his relief that through the slaughter of 144,000 children he has averted usurpation, and admonishes the audience never to speak of anyone else as king near him again. |

== Sources ==
The play was adapted from the corresponding pageant of the York Mystery Plays or a similar text.

== Interpretations ==
Peter Ramey has inferred that performances of the play demanded extensive interaction between the audience and the actors, developing the fiction that the audience are themselves characters in the play: "Herod all but begs for vocal opposition from the crowd, repeatedly daring any who are present to challenge him". Yet, in his interpretation, even heckling or opposition from the audience ultimately underlines the fact that, "since Herod controls the terms of the drama", emphasising the powerfully hierarchical structures of medieval English society.

Several commentators have read Herod the Great as developing the theatrical and comical potential of Herod, possibly at the expense of religious or moral contemplation.

The resistance of the mothers in Herod the Great and similar plays has attracted considerable commentary. As the women switch between violent resistance and lamentation, their portrayal draws on stereotypes of unruly women (like Noah's ill-behaved wife in the mystery plays' depictions of the Flood) yet also foreshadows women's lamentations at the crucifixion of Jesus as well, perhaps, as Herod's own wailing in Hell, giving the female characters depth and moral weight. Through its female characters, the play questions patriarchy, power, violence, and tyranny, yet arguably ultimately accepts their naturalness rather than presenting alternative paradigms for understand the world.

== Editions ==
- Herod the Great, in Everyman and Medieval Miracle Plays, ed. by A. C. Cawley, Everyman's Library, 381 (London: Dent, 1922) [new edn 1974], pp. 105–23.
- Herod the Great, in The Towneley Plays, ed. by Garrett P. J. Epp (Kalamazoo, MI: Medieval Institute Publications, 2018).
- Herod the Great, in The Towneley Plays, ed. by Martin Stevens and A. C. Cawley, Early English Text Society, s.s., 13–14, 2 vols (Oxford: Oxford University Press, 1994), pp. 167–81.
- https://sites.fas.harvard.edu/~chaucer/special/litsubs/drama/herod.html
