= The Talents (play) =

The Talents, or Processus Talentorum, is a play from the Middle English recitals The Towneley Plays (ca. 1460).

This play contains an early example of macaronic English-Latin verse, spoken by the character Pontius Pilate:

...
Stynt, I say! gyf men place
quia sum dominus dominorum!
he that agans me says
rapietur lux oculorum;
Therfor gyf ye me space
ne tendam vim brachiorum,
And then get ye no grace
contestor Iura polorum,
Caueatis; Rewle I the Iure,
Maxime pure,
Towne quoque rure,
Me paueatis.
Stemate regali
kyng atus gate me of pila;
Tramite legali
Am I ordand to reyn upon Iuda,
Nomine wlgari
pownce pilate, that may ye well say,
Qui bene wlt fari
shuld call me fownder of all lay.
...
