= Wakefield Mystery Plays =

Series of mystery plays

The Wakefield or Towneley Mystery Plays are a series of thirty-two mystery plays based on the Bible most likely performed around the Feast of Corpus Christi probably in the town of Wakefield, England during the Late Middle Ages until 1576. It is one of only four surviving English mystery play cycles. Some scholars argue that the Wakefield cycle is not a cycle at all, but a mid-sixteenth-century compilation, formed by a scribe bringing together three separate groups of plays.

The unique manuscript, now housed at the Huntington Library, San Marino, California, originated in the mid-fifteenth century. The Towneley family who lent their name to the manuscript, sold it at an auction in 1814, but it was probably part of their library at a much earlier date. Although almost the entire manuscript is in a fifteenth-century hand, the cycle was performed as early as the fourteenth century in an earlier form.

The Wakefield Cycle is most renowned for the inclusion of The Second Shepherds' Play, one of the jewels of medieval theatre. It also contains The Talents, a macaronic poem in Middle English and Latin.

Theatre Royal Wakefield (formerly Wakefield Theatre Royal & Opera House) produced a modern-day version of the plays in Wakefield Cathedral with a young community cast from 11 to 20 August 2016.

== Authorship ==
The cycle is the work of many authors, some sourced from the York Cycle. However, the most significant contribution has been attributed to an anonymous author known as the "Wakefield Master." It is believed that his additions include Noah, The First Shepherds' Play, The Second Shepherds' Play, Herod the Great and The Buffeting of Christ. This common authorship is suspected due to a unique nine-line rhymed stanza, which is evident in all five texts.

The term "Wakefield Master" emerged from a need to distinguish some material in the Towneley manuscript from a mass of unexceptional material, and was first coined by Charles Mills Gayley. In 1903, Gayley and Alwin Thaler published an anthology of criticism and dramatic selections entitled Representative English Comedies. It had long been believed that the Towneley Play was a mediocre work that showed extensive borrowing from other sources but containing vibrant and exciting material, apparently by one author, who was responsible for four or five complete pageants and extensive revisions. Gayley refers to this person as the "master" (with a lowercase m) in the book. Then in a 1907 article, Gayley emended this to "The Wakefield Master," the name which is still frequently used.

Within the Broadview Anthology of Medieval Drama, Christina M. Fitzgerald and John T. Sebastian find it important to note, "the quotation marks placed around the name 'Wakefield Master' are thus to be taken to indicate that the ascription of authorship is the product of convention, rather than proven fact. All that can be said with confidence is that there seems clearly to have been a common force involved in the shaping of all five of these plays."

The most obvious of these characteristics is that several of the pageants use a distinctive stanza, sometimes called the Wakefield Stanza (see below). The pageants that manifest the Wakefield Stanza are noted for comedy, social satire, and intense psychological realism. These qualities also show up throughout the Towneley Cycle, most often where it seems to depart from its presumed sources.

Some question the existence of one "Wakefield Master", and propose that multiple authors could have written in the Wakefield Stanza. Barbara Palmer suggests that the story of the Wakefield Master and the suggestion that the Second Shepherd's Play was performed as part of the Wakefield Cycle were both inventions of an amateur historian named J. M. W. Walker. However, scholars and literary critics find it useful to hypothesize a single talent behind them, due to the unique poetic qualities of the works ascribed to him.

== Staging ==
There is widespread disagreement among scholars concerning the staging of the Wakefield Cycle, and of mystery plays in general. It is known that the cycle at York was staged on wagons that moved from place to place in the city, with multiple plays staged simultaneously in different locales in the city. However, there is disagreement as to whether the Wakefield plays were performed in a similar manner.

One problem is the population of Wakefield in 1377, which is approximately the date of the first performance of the plays. It consisted of 567 people aged sixteen or older. Assuming that half were male, that leaves only about 280 men to play the 243 roles in the plays. This leaves many to believe that multiple plays were performed by the same cast during most of the lifetime of the cycle.

Another way in which the Wakefield cycle differed in its staging from other cycles is that lack of association with the guilds. In other towns York and Coventry certain plays were staged by different guilds, according to their specialty (such as the shipwrights staging the Noah play). Although the names of four guilds are found on the manuscript (the barkers, glovers, litsters, and fishers), they are found in a later hand than most of the manuscript. This has led some to believe that for its entire lifetime, the Wakefield Cycle was sponsored and produced by other associations, either governmental or religious. Either way, it was surely performed by non-professional actors from the community, as were all the cycles.

== Wakefield Stanza ==
The most notable poetic innovation in the manuscript is called the Wakefield Stanza, which is found in the Noah play, the two shepherds' plays, the Herod play, and the Buffeting of Christ pageant. This unique characteristic may be described as:

a nine-line stanza containing one quatrain with internal rhyme and a tail-rhymed cauda, rhyming AAAABCCCB; or, a thirteen-line stanza containing a cross-rhymed octet frons, a tercet cauda with tail-rhymes, the whole rhyming ABABABABCDDDC.

The former description was based upon the earliest editions of the play that reflected the space-saving habits of the medieval scribe, who often wrote two verse-lines on a single manuscript line. Thus, depending upon how one interprets the manuscript, a stanza (from the Noah pageant) might appear in either of the following forms:

The thryd tyme wille I prufe what depnes we bere
Now long shalle thou hufe, lay in thy lyne there.
I may towch with my hufe the grownd evyn here.
Then begynnys to grufe to us mery chere;
Bot, husband,
What grownd may this be?
The hyllys of Armonye.
Now blissid be he
That thus for us can ordand.

The thryd tyme wille I prufe
what depnes we bere
Now long shalle thou hufe,
lay in thy lyne there.
I may towch with my hufe
the grownd evyn here.
Then begynnys to grufe
to us mery chere;
Bot, husband,
What grownd may this be?
The hyllys of Armonye.
Now blissid be he
That thus for us can ordand.

(All the punctuation and indentations are editorial and not part of the original manuscript.)

In the first case above, the first four lines contain internal rhyme (i.e., "prufe," "hufe," "hufe," and "grufe"); but the second example arranges the same verses in shorter lines, which in the manuscript are separated from one another by apparently random use of the obelus (÷), virgules [/], double-virgules[//], and line-breaks. In the second example, it is readily seen that the poet uses a cross-rhymed octet frons with a five-line tail-rhymed cauda. It is this innovative use of the cauda that is most distinctive in the stanza.

There is some disagreement over whether the Wakefield Stanza is nine or thirteen lines long. Owing largely to A. C.Cawley's 1957 edition of five of the pageants, and to others' arrangement of the manuscript lines, this is sometimes thought to be a nine-line stanza, with the quatrain containing internal rhyme. This view predominated in the critical literature until the late twentieth century, and has fallen out of favor. When Cawley himself edited the entire cycle with Martin Stevens for publication in 1994, the two opted to present the lines as a thirteen-line stanza. In any case, the number of syllables in the lines is variable, and the number of stressed syllables can usually be counted at two or three per line in the thirteen-line version.

Since the Towneley Play was a drama and therefore spoken rather than read silently, to some degree this presentation of the poetic units in graphical form is somewhat arbitrary and inconsequential. But it does provide insights into the poetic influences and innovations of the Wakefield Master.

== Protestant alterations ==
In 1576, the Wakefield plays were altered by the Protestant authorities, before being discontinued completely. "In that year, the Diocesan Court of High Commission at York revealed their attitude to the citizens of Wakefield in no uncertain terms. Permission was granted for the performance of their Cycle provided that:

'In the said play no pageant be used or set further wherein the Ma(jest) ye of God the Father, God the Sonne, or God the Holie Goste or the administration of either the Sacrementes of baptism or of the Lordes Supper be counterfeited or represented, or anything plaid which tend to the maintenance of superstition and idolatry or which be contrary to the laws of God or of the realm.'" (Kyng Johan, Lines 413–15)

Such strictures are a Protestant form of the aniconism in Judaism, the forbidding of any depiction of God or other supernatural beings, such as angels or demons.

In addition, alterations were sometimes made in the scripts to reflect Reformed doctrine. For example, the play involving John the Baptist was altered to conform to Protestant doctrines about the sacraments. The word "pope" was excised from "Herod the Great," and twelve leaves are completely missing, which scholars suspect contained plays about the death, Assumption, and coronation as Queen of Heaven of the Virgin Mary.

== Sources of the plays ==
The majority of the plays that make up the Wakefield Cycle are based (some rather tenuously) on the Bible, while the others are taken from either Roman Catholic or folk tradition. The final play in the cycle, The Judgement, includes an excerpt from the Athanasian Creed.

1. The Creation myth
2. The Killing of Abel
3. Noah
4. Abraham
5. Isaac
6. Jacob
7. Pharaoh (the Exodus)
8. The Procession of the Prophets
9. Caesar Augustus
10. The Annunciation
11. The Salutation of Elizabeth
12. The First Shepherds' Play
13. The Second Shepherds' Play
14. The Offering of the Magi
15. The Flight into Egypt
16. Herod the Great
17. The Purification of Mary
18. The Play of the Doctors
19. John the Baptist
20. Lazarus
21. The Conspiracy
22. The Buffeting
23. The Scourging
24. The Hanging of Judas
25. The Crucifixion
26. The Talents
27. The Deliverance of Souls
28. The Resurrection
29. The Pilgrims
30. Thomas of India
31. The Ascension of the Lord
32. The Judgement

== Appearance in popular culture ==
When the Andrew Lloyd Webber–Tim Rice musical Joseph and the Amazing Technicolor Dreamcoat was in its infancy in 1972, it was so short that productions needed an added preamble to create a valid showpiece. Frank Dunlop, in the first British theatrical performances of the musical on stage, preceded his Young Vic productions of Joseph with his own adaptation of the first six Wakefield Mystery Plays, which were credited in the programme. The entire production was a double bill called Bible One: Two Looks at the Book of Genesis. Part I, entitled The Creation to Jacob (or Mediaevel Mystery Plays), was Dunlop's reworking of the first six Wakefield plays, with music by Alan Doggett. Part II was Joseph and the Amazing Technicolor Dreamcoat.

An adaptation of the plays was performed at London's National Theatre under the title of The Mysteries first in 1977. in 1985, it was filmed and broadcast for Channel 4.

As part of Wakefield's centenary celebrations in 1988, Adrian Henri was commissioned to do a modern adaptation of the Wakefield Medieval Mystery Plays. Simple vernacular speech is retained, spanning the Creation to the Resurrection. The music is by Andy Roberts.

== Sources ==
Rose, Martial. (1963). "An Introduction to the Wakefield Plays," in The Wakefield Mystery Plays, Anchor Books.
