= Herod the Great =

1st-century BCE king of Judea

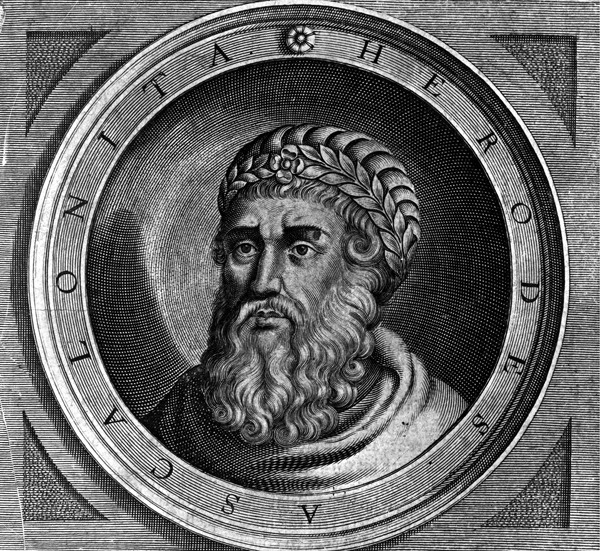

King of Judaea
- Reign: 37–4 BCE (Schürer); 36–1 BCE (Steinmann)
- Born: c. 72 BCE; Idumea, Hasmonean Judea
- Died: January–April 1 BCE (Steinmann); March–April 4 BCE (Schürer); Jericho, Herodian kingdom, Roman Empire
- Burial: Most likely the Herodium
- Spouse: Doris; Mariamne I; Mariamne II; Malthace; Cleopatra of Jerusalem
- Issue among others: Antipater II; Alexander; Herod Archelaus; Herod Antipas; Philip
- Dynasty: Herodian
- Father: Antipater the Idumaean
- Mother: Cypros
- Religion: Second Temple Judaism

Herod I (Note: /ˈhɛrəd/; Hebrew: הוֹרְדוֹס, romanized: Hōrəḏōs; Ancient Greek: Ἡρῴδης, romanized: Hērṓidēs) or Herod the Great (c. 72 – 4 or 1 BCE) was a Roman Jewish client king of the Herodian kingdom of Judea. He is known for his colossal building projects. Among these works are the rebuilding of the Second Temple in Jerusalem and the expansion of its base—the Western Wall being part of it. Many of the crucial details of his life are recorded in the works of the 1st century CE Roman–Jewish historian Josephus.

Despite Herod's successes, including forging a new aristocracy, he has been criticized by various historians. Some consider his reign to have been tyrannical.

Herod the Great is described in the Christian Bible as the coordinator of the Massacre of the Innocents. Most other New Testament references to 'Herod' are either to his son Herod Antipas (such as the events leading to the executions of John the Baptist and Jesus of Nazareth in Matthew 14), or his grandson Herod Agrippa (in Acts 12). Upon Herod's death, the Romans divided his kingdom among three of his sons and his sister: his son Herod Antipas received the tetrarchy of Galilee and Peraea.

Other family members of Herod the Great include Herod's son Herod Archelaus, who became ethnarch of Judea, Samaria, and Idumea; Herod's son Philip who became tetrarch of territories north and east of the Jordan River; and Herod's sister Salome I, who was given a toparchy including the cities of Jabneh, Ashdod, and Fasayil (Phasaelis).

== Biography ==
Herod was born around 72 BCE in Idumea, south of Judea. He was the second son of Antipater the Idumaean, a high-ranking official under ethnarch Hyrcanus II, and Cypros, a Nabatean Arab princess from Petra, in present-day Jordan. Herod's father was by descent an Edomite; his ancestors had been forcibly converted to Judaism. Herod was raised as a Jew. Strabo, a contemporary of Herod, held that the Idumaeans, whom he identified as of Nabataean origin, constituted the majority of the population of western Judea, where they commingled with the Judaeans and adopted their customs. This is a view shared also by some modern scholarly works which consider Idumaeans to be either Arab or Nabataean in origin. Thus, Herod's ethnic background was Arab on both sides of his family. This claim has been challenged by historians, however, as many also argue the Edomites not Arab through various different markers, most notably in how the Edomite language was most similar to Biblical Hebrew and Moabite than Classical or Nabataean Arabic, with the Nabataean Arabs having displaced rather than absorbed the Edomites, thus making Herod only half-Arab. According to Josephus, Herod was a descendant of Eleazar Maccabeus (Auran) of the Hasmoneans, making him half-Jewish.

Herod rose to power largely through his father's good relations with the Roman general and dictator Julius Caesar, who entrusted Antipater with the public affairs of Judea. Herod was appointed provincial governor of Galilee in c. 47 BCE, when he was about either 25 or 28 years old (Greek original: "15 years of age"). There he faithfully farmed the taxes of that region for the Roman Senate, and he met with success in ridding that region of bandits. Antipater's eldest son, Phasael, served in the same capacity as governor of Jerusalem. During this time, the young Herod cultivated a good relationship with Sextus Caesar, the acting Roman governor of Syria, who appointed Herod as general of Coelesyria and Samaria, greatly expanding his sphere of influence. He enjoyed the backing of Rome, but the Sanhedrin condemned his brutality. When yet a private man, Herod had determined to punish Hyrcanus the Hasmonean king, who had once summoned Herod to stand trial for murder, but Herod was restrained from doing so by the intervention of his father and his elder brother.

In 41 BCE, the Roman leader Mark Antony named Herod and his brother Phasael as tetrarchs. They were placed in this role to support Hyrcanus II. In 40 BCE Antigonus, Hyrcanus' nephew, took the Judean throne from his uncle with the help of the Parthians. Herod fled to Rome to plead with the Romans to restore Hyrcanus II to power. The Romans had a special interest in Judea because their general Pompey the Great had conquered Jerusalem in 63 BCE, thus placing the region in the Roman sphere of influence. In Rome, Herod was unexpectedly appointed King of the Jews by the Roman Senate. Josephus puts this in the year of the consulship of Calvinus and Pollio (40 BCE), but Appian places it in 39 BCE. Herod went back to Judea to win his kingdom from Antigonus. Toward the end of the campaign against Antigonus, Herod married the granddaughter of Hyrcanus II, Mariamne (known as Mariamne I), who was also a niece of Antigonus. Herod did this in an attempt to secure his claim to the throne and gain some Jewish favor. However, Herod already had a wife, Doris, and a young son, Antipater, and chose therefore to banish Doris and her child.

Herod and Sosius, the governor of Syria, at the behest of Mark Antony, set out with a large army in 37 or 36 BCE and captured Jerusalem, Herod then sending Antigonus for execution to Mark Antony. From this moment, Herod took the role as sole ruler of Judea and the title of basileus for himself, ushering in the Herodian dynasty and ending the Hasmonean Dynasty. Josephus reports this as being in the year of the consulship of Agrippa and Gallus (37 BCE), but also says that it was exactly 27 years after Jerusalem fell to Pompey, which would indicate 36 BCE. Cassius Dio also reports that in 37, "the Romans accomplished nothing worthy of note" in the area, implying that he did not believe Herod conquered Jerusalem in that year. According to Josephus, Herod ruled for 37 years, 34 of them after capturing Jerusalem.

As some believe Herod's family were converts to Judaism, his religious commitment was questioned by some elements of Jewish society. When John Hyrcanus conquered the region of Idumaea (the Edom of the Hebrew Bible) in 140–130 BCE, he required all Idumaeans to obey Jewish law or to leave; most Idumaeans thus converted to Judaism, which meant that they had to be circumcised, and many intermarried with the Jews and adopted their customs. While Herod publicly identified himself as a Jew and was considered as such by some, this religious identification was undermined by the decadent lifestyle of the Herodians, which would have earned them the antipathy of observant Jews.

Herod later executed several members of his own family, including his wife Mariamne I.

== Reign in Judea ==
The Herodian kingdom at its greatest extent

Herod's rule marked a new beginning in the history of Judea. Judea had been ruled autonomously by the Hasmonean kings from 140 until 63 BCE. The Hasmonean kings retained their titles, but became clients of Rome after the conquest by Pompey in 63 BCE. Herod overthrew the Hasmonean Antigonus in a three-year-long war between 37 and 34 BCE, ruled under Roman overlordship until his death, and officially passed on the throne to his sons, thus establishing his own, so-called Herodian dynasty.

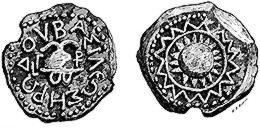
Obverse of a Herodian copper coin, bearing the legend ΒΑΣΙΛΕΩΣ ΗΡΩΔΟΥ Basileōs Hērōdou

Herod was granted the title of "King of Judea" by the Roman Senate. As such, he was a vassal of the Roman Empire, expected to support the interests of his Roman patrons. Nonetheless, just when Herod obtained leadership in Judea, his rule faced two threats. The first threat came from his mother-in-law Alexandra, who sought to regain power for her family, the Hasmoneans, whose dynasty Herod had overthrown in 37 or 36 BCE (see Siege of Jerusalem). In the same year, Cleopatra married the Roman leader Antony. Recognizing Cleopatra's influence over Antony, Alexandra asked Cleopatra for aid in making Aristobulus III the High Priest. As a member of the Hasmonean family, Aristobulus III might partially repair the fortunes of the Hasmoneans if made High Priest. Alexandra's request was made, but Cleopatra urged Alexandra to leave Judea with Aristobulus III and visit Antony. Herod received word of this plot, and feared that if Antony met Aristobolus III in person he might name Aristobulus III King of Judea. This concern induced Herod, in 35 BCE, to order the assassination of Aristobulus, ending this first threat to Herod's throne. The marriage of 37 BCE also sparked a power struggle between Roman leaders Octavian, who would later be called Augustus, and Antony. Herod, owing his throne to Rome, had to pick a side, and he chose Antony. In 31 at Actium, Antony lost to Octavian, posing a second threat to Herod's rule. Herod had to regain Octavian's support if he was to keep his throne. At Rhodes in 31 BCE, Herod, through his ability to keep Judea open to Rome as a link to the wealth of Syria and Egypt, and ability to defend the frontier, convinced Octavian that he would be loyal to him. Herod continued to rule his subjects as he saw fit. Despite the autonomy afforded to Herod in his internal reign over Judea, restrictions were placed upon him in his relations with other kingdoms.

Herod's support from the Roman Empire was a major factor in enabling him to maintain his authority over Judea. There have been mixed interpretations concerning Herod's popularity during his reign. In The Jewish War, Josephus characterizes Herod's rule in generally favorable terms, and gives Herod the benefit of the doubt for the infamous events that took place during his reign. However, in his later work, Antiquities of the Jews, Josephus emphasizes the tyrannical authority that many scholars have come to associate with Herod's reign.

Herod's despotic rule has been demonstrated by many of his security measures aimed at suppressing the contempt his people, especially Jews, had towards him. For instance, it has been suggested that Herod used secret police to monitor and report the feelings of the general populace toward him. He sought to prohibit protests, and had opponents removed by force. He had a bodyguard of 2,000 soldiers. Josephus describes various units of Herod's personal guard taking part in Herod's funeral, including the Doryphnoroi, and a Thracian, Celtic (probably Gallic) and Germanic contingent. While the term Doryphnoroi does not have an ethnic connotation, the unit was probably composed of distinguished veteran soldiers and young men from the most influential Jewish families. Thracians had served in the Jewish armies since the Hasmonean dynasty, while the Celtic contingent were former bodyguards of Cleopatra given as a gift by Augustus to Herod following the Battle of Actium. The Germanic contingent was modeled upon Augustus's personal bodyguard, the Germani Corporis Custodes, responsible for guarding the palace.

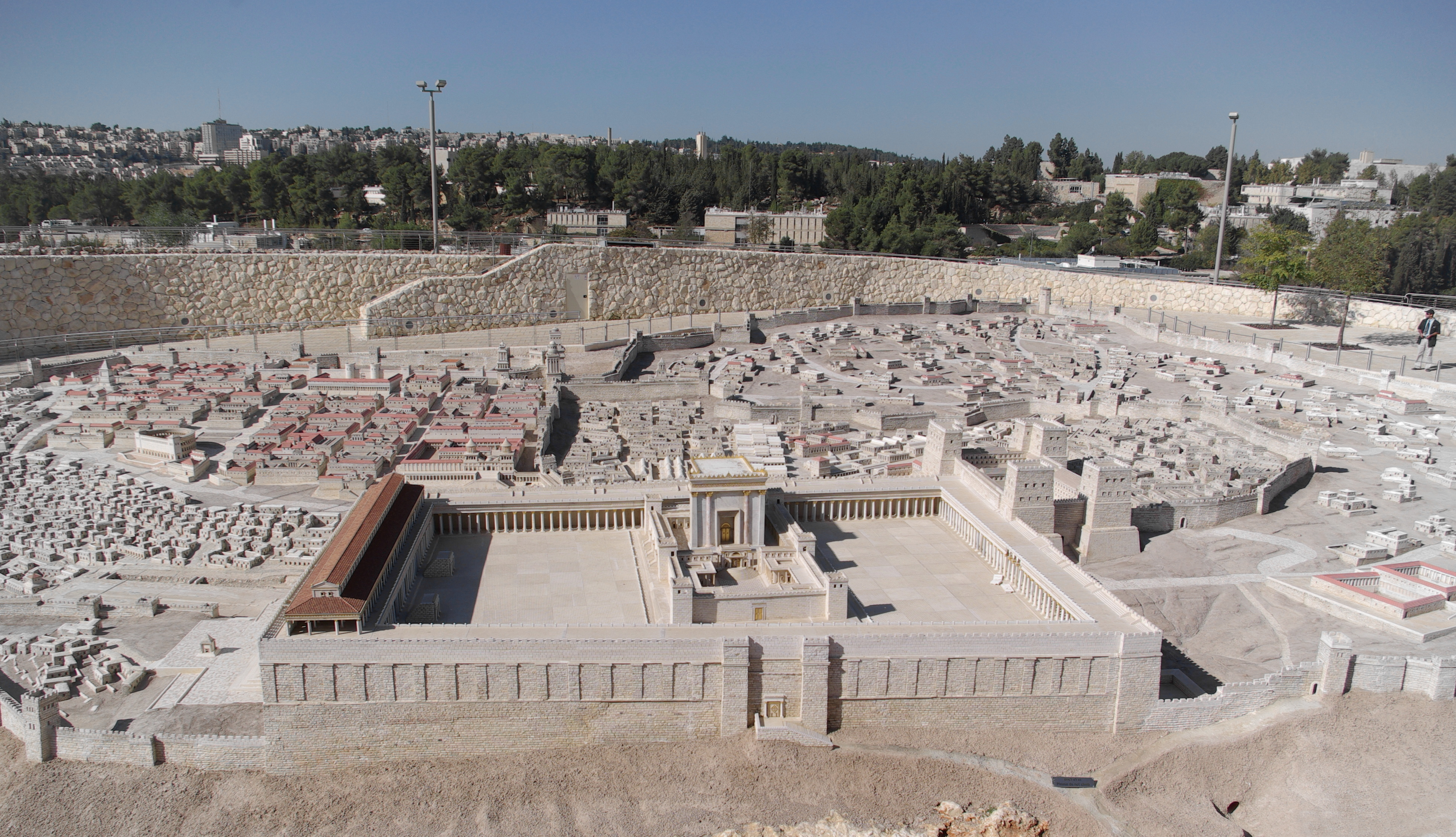
Herod's Temple as depicted on the Holyland Model of Jerusalem. The expansion of the Temple was Herod's most ambitious project.

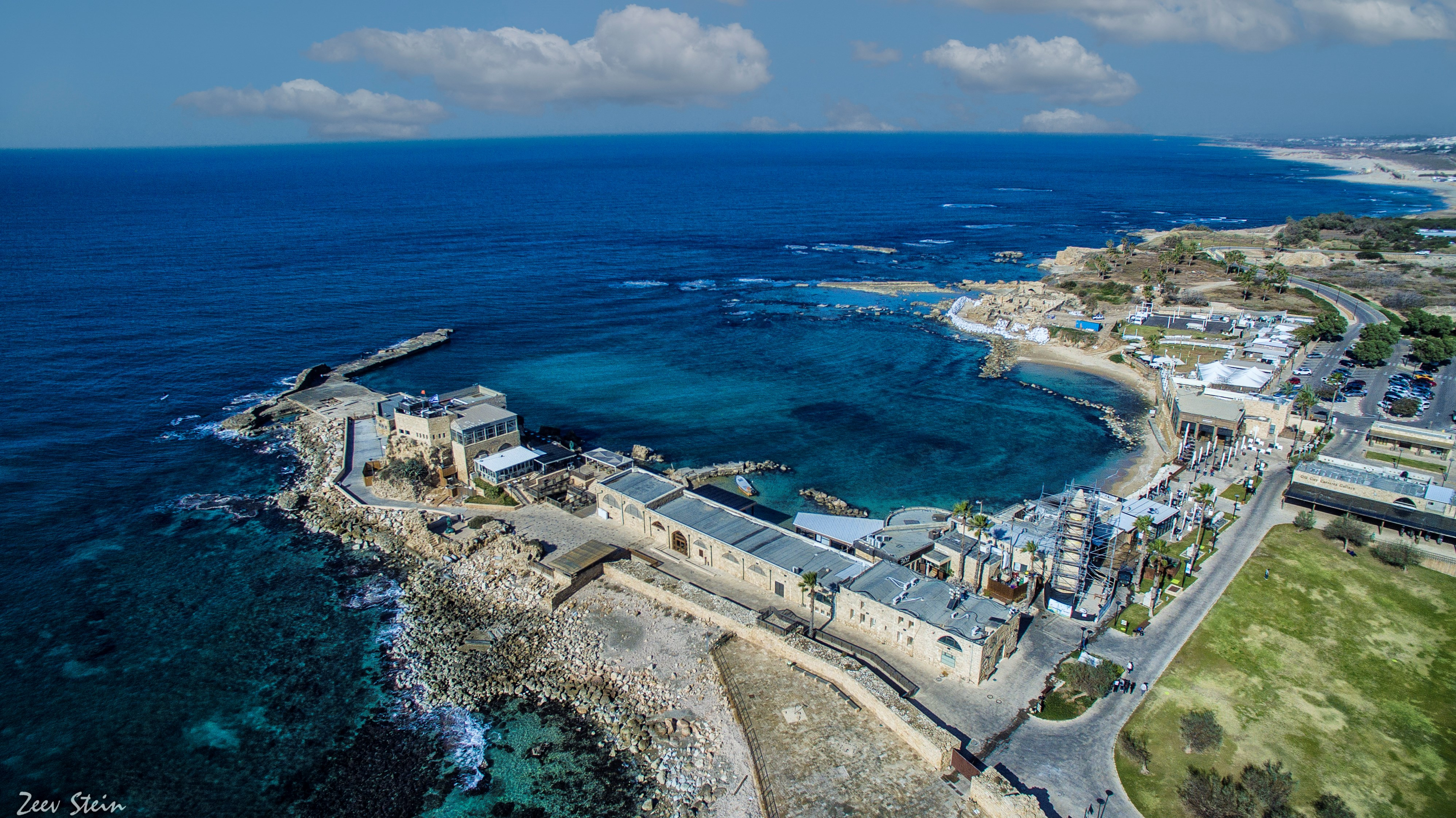
Ruins of Caesarea's harbor

Herod undertook many colossal building projects. Around 19 BCE, he began a massive expansion project on the Temple Mount. In addition to fully rebuilding and enlarging the Second Jewish Temple, he artificially expanded the platform on which it stood, doubling it in size. Today's Western Wall formed part of the retaining perimeter wall of this platform. In addition, Herod also used the latest technology in hydraulic cement and underwater construction to build the harbor at Caesarea Maritima. While Herod's zeal for building transformed Judea, his motives were not selfless. Although he built fortresses (Masada, Herodium, Alexandrium, Hyrcania, and Machaerus) in which he and his family could take refuge in case of insurrection, these vast projects were also intended to gain the support of the Jews and improve his reputation as a leader. Herod also built Sebaste and other pagan cities because he wanted to appeal to the country's substantial pagan population. In order to fund these projects, Herod utilized a Hasmonean taxation system that heavily burdened the Judean people. Nevertheless, these enterprises brought employment and opportunities for the people's provision. In some instances, Herod took it upon himself to provide for his people in times of need, such as during a severe famine that occurred in 25 BCE.

Although he made many attempts at conforming to traditional Jewish laws, there were more instances where Herod was insensitive, which constitutes one of the major Jewish complaints of Herod as highlighted in Josephus' Antiquities of the Jews. In Jerusalem, Herod introduced foreign forms of entertainment, and erected a golden eagle at the entrance of the Temple, which suggested a greater interest in the welfare of Rome than of Jews. Herod's taxes garnered a bad reputation: his constant concern for his reputation led him to make frequent, expensive gifts, increasingly emptying the kingdom's coffers, and such lavish spending upset his Jewish subjects. The two major Jewish sects of the day, the Pharisees and the Sadducees, both showed opposition to Herod. The Pharisees were discontented because Herod disregarded many of their demands with respect to the Temple's construction. The Sadducees, who were closely associated with priestly responsibilities in the Temple, opposed Herod because he replaced their high priests with outsiders from Babylonia and Alexandria, in an effort to gain support from the Jewish Diaspora. Herod's outreach efforts gained him little, and at the end of his reign anger and dissatisfaction were common amongst Jews. Heavy outbreaks of violence and riots followed Herod's death in many cities, including Jerusalem, as pent-up resentments boiled over. The scope of the disturbances sparked hopes that the Jews of Judea might some day overthrow the Roman overlords, hopes reawakened decades later in the outbreak of the First Jewish–Roman War in 66 CE.

== Herod and Augustus ==
The relationship between Herod and Augustus demonstrates the fragile politics of a deified Emperor and a King who ruled over the Jewish people and their holy lands. As they interacted, Herod's desire to satisfy both the Jewish and non-Jewish people of his kingdom had to be balanced with satisfying Augustus' aim to spread the culture, architecture and values of Rome throughout his empire. The sway of Augustus and the Roman Empire on the policy led to the use of Romanized construction throughout Herod's Kingdom. An example of Herod's architectural expansion of Judea in devotion to Rome can be seen with the third temple he commissioned, the Augusteum, a temple dedicated to Augustus.

== Architectural achievements ==
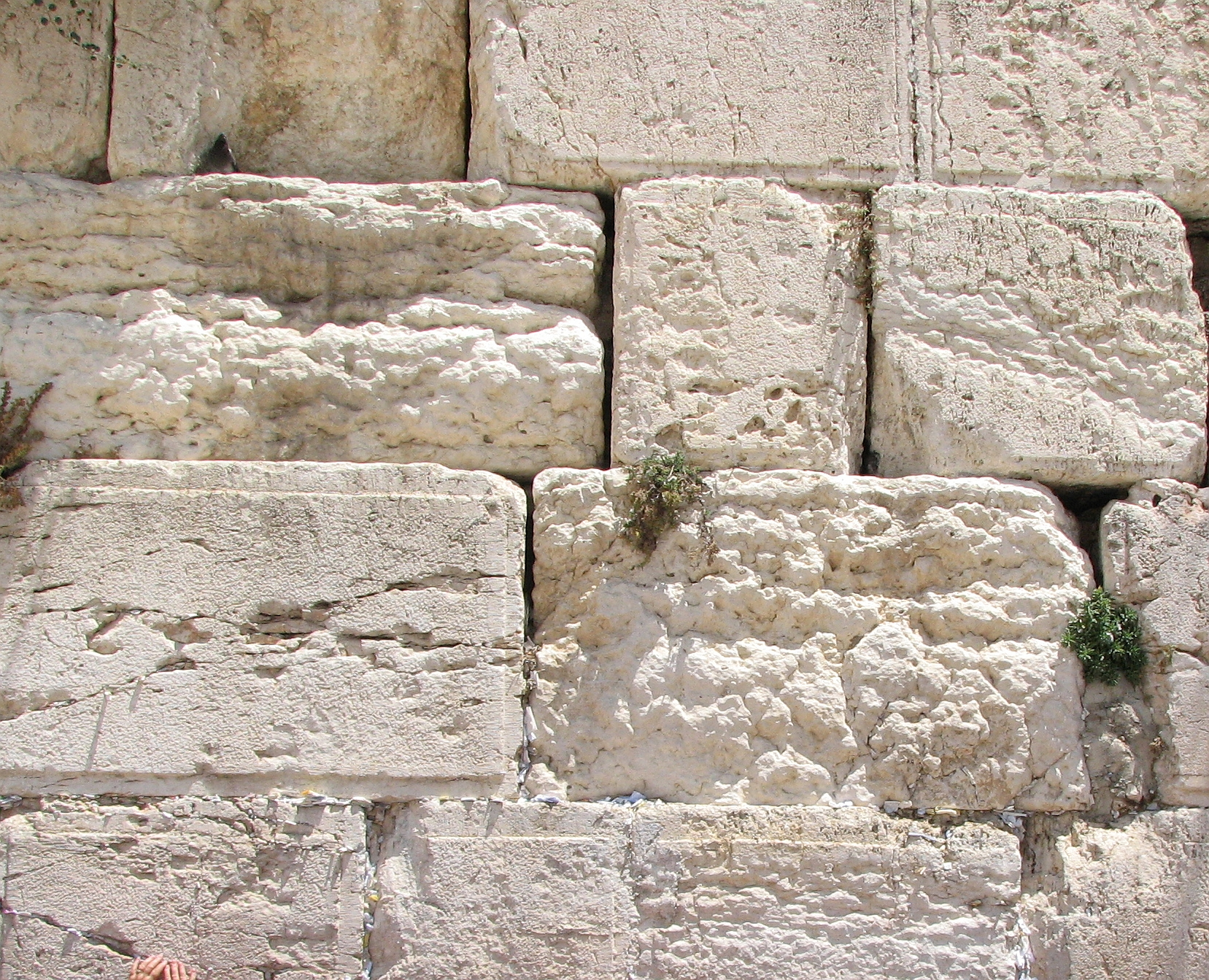
Distinctive Herodian masonry at the Western Wall in Jerusalem

Herod's most famous and ambitious project was the expansion of the Second Temple in Jerusalem which was undertaken so that he would "have a capital city worthy of his dignity and grandeur", and with this reconstruction, Herod hoped to gain more support from the Jews. Recent findings suggest that the Temple Mount walls and Robinson's Arch may not have been completed until at least 20 years after his death, during the reign of Herod Agrippa II.

In the 18th year of his reign (20–19 BCE), Herod rebuilt the Temple on "a more magnificent scale". Although work on out-buildings and courts continued for another 80 years, the new Temple was finished in a year and a half. To comply with religious law, Herod employed 1,000 priests as masons and carpenters in the rebuilding. The finished temple, which was destroyed in 70 CE, is sometimes referred to as Herod's Temple. Today, only the four retaining walls remain standing, including the Western Wall. These walls created a flat platform (the Temple Mount) upon which the Temple was then constructed.

Herod's other achievements include the development of water supplies for Jerusalem, building fortresses such as Masada and Herodium, and founding new cities such as Caesarea Maritima and the enclosures of Cave of the Patriarchs and Mamre in Hebron. He and Cleopatra owned a monopoly over the extraction of asphalt from the Dead Sea, which was used in shipbuilding. He leased copper mines on Cyprus from the Roman emperor.

== New Testament references ==
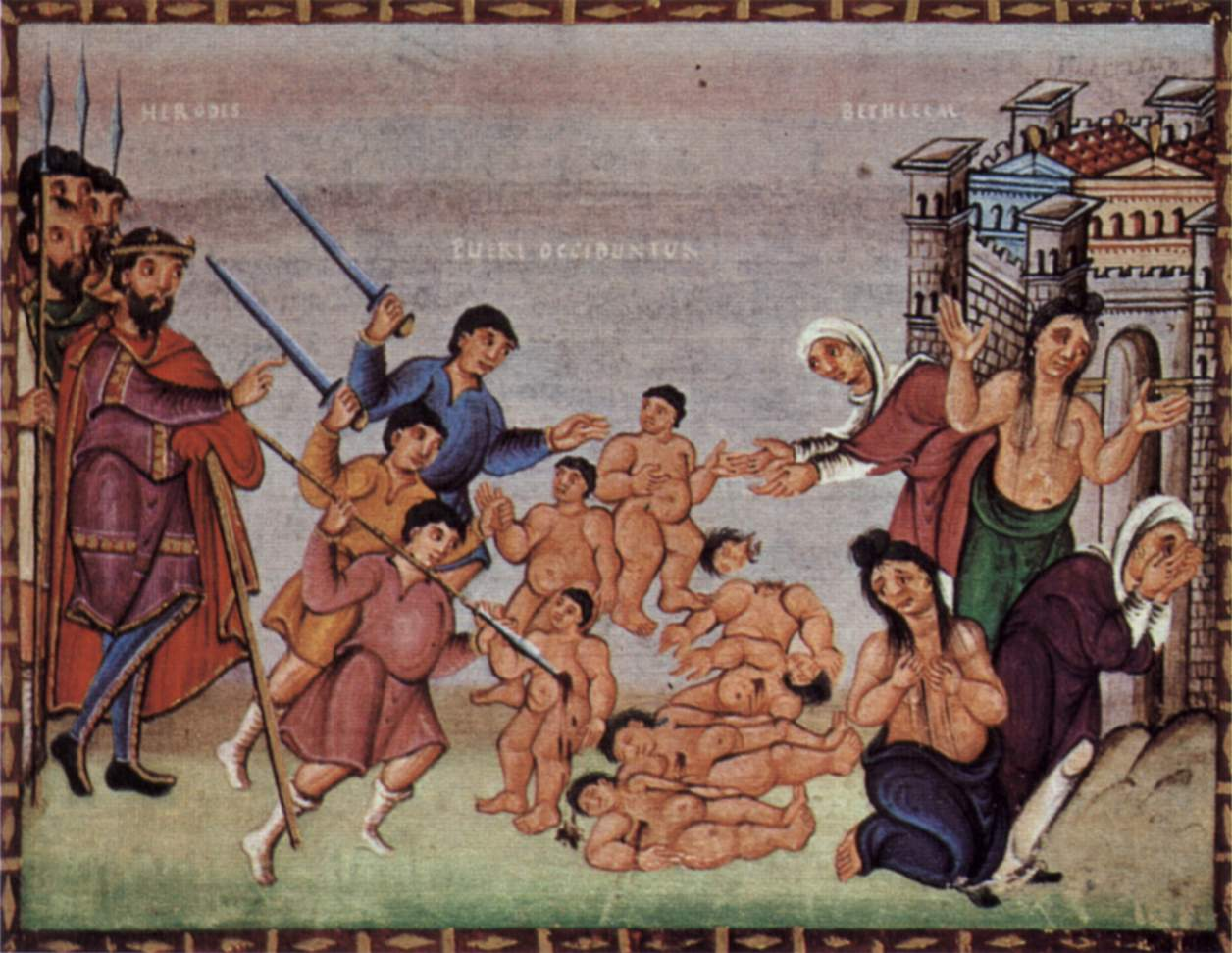
Massacre of the Innocents, 10th century Codex Egberti. Herod on the left.

Members of the Herodian dynasty mentioned in the New Testament

The Gospel of Matthew describes an episode known as the Massacre of the Innocents. According to this account, after the birth of Jesus, a group of magi from the East visited Herod to inquire the whereabouts of "the one having been born king of the Jews", because they had seen his star in the east (or, according to certain translations, at its rising) and therefore wanted to pay him homage. Herod, as King of the Jews, was alarmed at the prospect of a usurper. Herod assembled the chief priests and scribes of the people and asked them where the "Anointed One" (the Messiah, Greek: Ὁ Χριστός, romanized: ho Christos) was to be born. They answered, in Bethlehem, citing Micah 5:2. Herod therefore sent the magi to Bethlehem, instructing them to search for the child and, after they had found him, to "report to me, so that I too may go and worship him". However, after they had found Jesus, they were warned in a dream not to report back to Herod. Similarly, Joseph was warned in a dream that Herod intended to kill Jesus, so he and his family fled to Egypt. When Herod realized he had been outwitted, he gave orders to kill all boys of the age of two and under in Bethlehem and its vicinity. Joseph and his family stayed in Egypt until Herod's death, then moved to Nazareth in Galilee to avoid living under Herod's son Archelaus.

Most modern biographers of Herod, and a majority of biblical scholars, dismiss Matthew's story as a literary device. Contemporary non-biblical sources, including Josephus and the surviving writings of Nicolaus of Damascus (who knew Herod personally), provide no corroboration for Matthew's account of the massacre, and it is not mentioned in any other gospel. Classical historian Michael Grant states "[t]he tale is not history but myth or folk-lore", while Peter Richardson notes that the story's absence from the Gospel of Luke and the accounts of Josephus "work[s] against the account's accuracy". Richardson suggests that the event in Matthew's gospel was inspired by Herod's murder of his own sons. Jodi Magness has said that "many scholars believe that the massacre of the innocents never occurred, but instead was inspired by Herod's reputation". Others, such as Paul Maier, suggest that since Bethlehem was a smaller town, the slaughter of about a half dozen children would not have warranted a mention from Josephus.

== Death ==
Divisions of the Herodian kingdom: Territory under Herod Archelaus Territory under Herod Antipas Territory under Philip the Tetrarch Territory under Salome I

Herod died in Jericho, after an unidentified but excruciatingly painful, putrefying illness, known to posterity as "Herod's Evil". (Note: Based on Josephus' descriptions, one medical expert has diagnosed Herod's cause of death as chronic kidney disease complicated by Fournier's gangrene.) Josephus states that the pain of his illness led Herod to attempt suicide by stabbing, and that the attempt was thwarted by his cousin. In some much later narratives and depictions, the attempt succeeds; for example, in the 12th-century Eadwine Psalter. Other medieval dramatizations, such as the Ordo Rachelis, follow Josephus' account.

Josephus stated that Herod was so concerned that no one would mourn his death that he commanded a large group of distinguished men to come to Jericho, and he gave an order that they should be killed at the time of his death so that the displays of grief that he craved would take place; his brother-in-law Alexas and his sister Salome did not carry out this wish.

=== Dating ===
In the 20th century, most scholarship concerning the date of Herod's death followed Emil Schürer's 1896 chronology, which placed the death of Herod in 4 BCE. This is three years earlier than all previous scholarship and tradition had placed his death (1 BCE). The primary argument for the 4 BCE date is that two of Herod's sons, Archelaus and Philip the Tetrarch, reported reign lengths that imply they believed their reigns started prior to 1 BCE. Josephus says that Archelaus reigned for ten years, and also says that he was deposed in 6 CE. It is also clear that Philip reckoned the length of his reign from a date prior to 1 BCE, although the different manuscripts of Josephus report conflicting figures about how long he reigned and when he died. However, Josephus reports that Herod gave his sons royal titles before his death, and that Archelaus held royal authority during Herod's lifetime.

In recent years, some scholars have presented new arguments for the traditional date of 1 BCE for Herod's death. According to Andrew Steinmann and Robert Young, the coins minted by Herod's sons Antipas and Philip indicate that their first regnal year started on 1 Tishrei 5 BCE, after they were given royal titles while Herod was still alive. While thousands of coins survive from Herod's sons, the earliest dated coins from Antipas and Philip are from years 4 and 5 respectively. This is expected if they first gained the ability to mint coins after their father died early in 1 BCE, but officially dated the beginning of their first year to the autumn of 5 BCE. Similarly, Filmer argues that Herod's sons backdated their reigns to assert an overlapping with Herod's rule, and bolster their own legitimacy.

Schürer's chronology dates Herod's siege of Jerusalem to the summer of 37 BCE. Josephus records that there was a shortage of food during this siege because it took place at the end of a Sabbatical year, the seventh year when the fields were not sown. Steinmann and Young have argued that if the siege took place in 37 BCE, then 40-41 CE (starting in the month of Tishrei and ending in Elul) must have been a Sabbatical year, 77 years after 38-37 BCE. But the records of Josephus and Philo imply that that year was not Sabbatical. During the Caligula statue crisis in late 40 CE, Josephus reports that "the season of the year required them to sow [the land]." Steinmann and Young conclude that Herod's siege could not have occurred in 37 BCE, and must have occurred in 36 BCE, which is consistent with a 1 BCE date for Herod's death.

In Josephus' account, Herod's death was preceded by first a Jewish fast day (10 Tevet 3761/Sun 24 Dec 1 BCE), a lunar eclipse and followed by Passover (27 March 1 CE). Objections to the 4 BCE date include the assertion that there was not nearly enough time between the eclipse on March 13 and Passover on April 10 for the recorded events surrounding Herod's death to have taken place.

=== Successors ===
Augustus respected the terms of Herod's will, which stipulated the division of Herod's kingdom among three of his sons. Augustus recognised Herod's son Herod Archelaus as ethnarch of Judea, Samaria, and Idumea until 6 CE. Augustus then judged Archelaus incompetent to rule, removed him from power, and combined the provinces of Samaria, Judea proper, and Idumea into Iudaea province. This enlarged province was ruled by a prefect until the year 41 CE. As to Herod's other sons, Herod Antipas was tetrarch of Galilee and Peraea from Herod's death to 39 CE when he was deposed and exiled. Philip became tetrarch of territories north and east of the Jordan, namely Iturea, Trachonitis, Batanea, Gaulanitis, Auranitis and Paneas, and ruled until his death in 34 CE.

== Herod's tomb ==
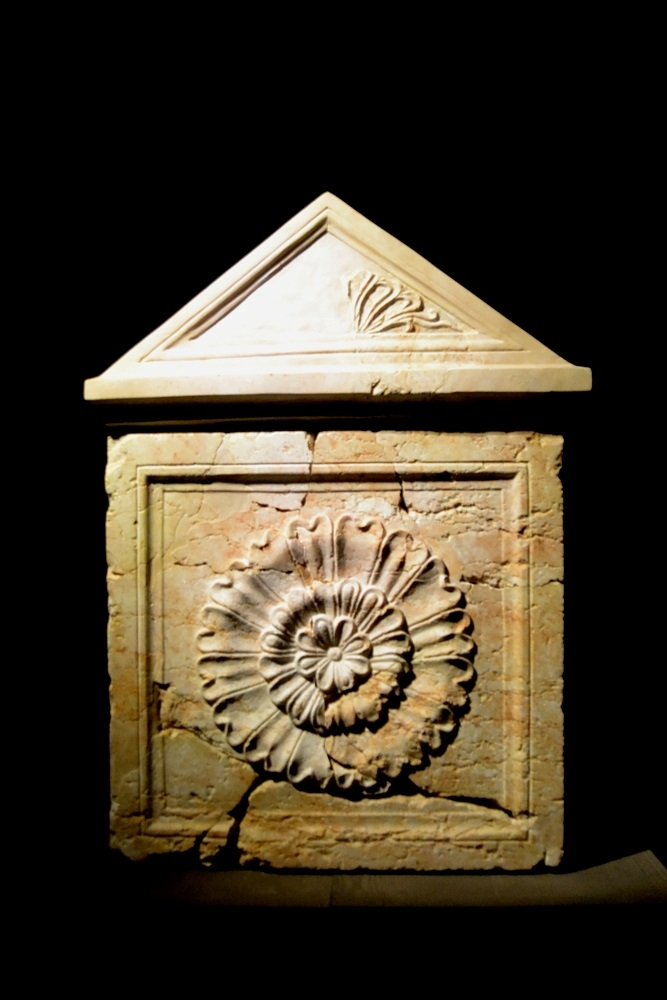
Herod's alleged sarcophagus, displayed at the Israel Museum

The location of Herod's tomb is documented by Josephus, who writes, "And the body was carried two hundred furlongs, to Herodium, where he had given order to be buried." Professor Ehud Netzer, an archaeologist from the Hebrew University, read the writings of Josephus and focused his search on the vicinity of the pool and its surroundings. An article in the New York Times states,

Lower Herodium consists of the remains of a large palace, a race track, service quarters, and a monumental building whose function is still a mystery. Perhaps, says Ehud Netzer, who excavated the site, it is Herod's mausoleum. Next to it is a pool, almost twice as large as modern Olympic-size pools.

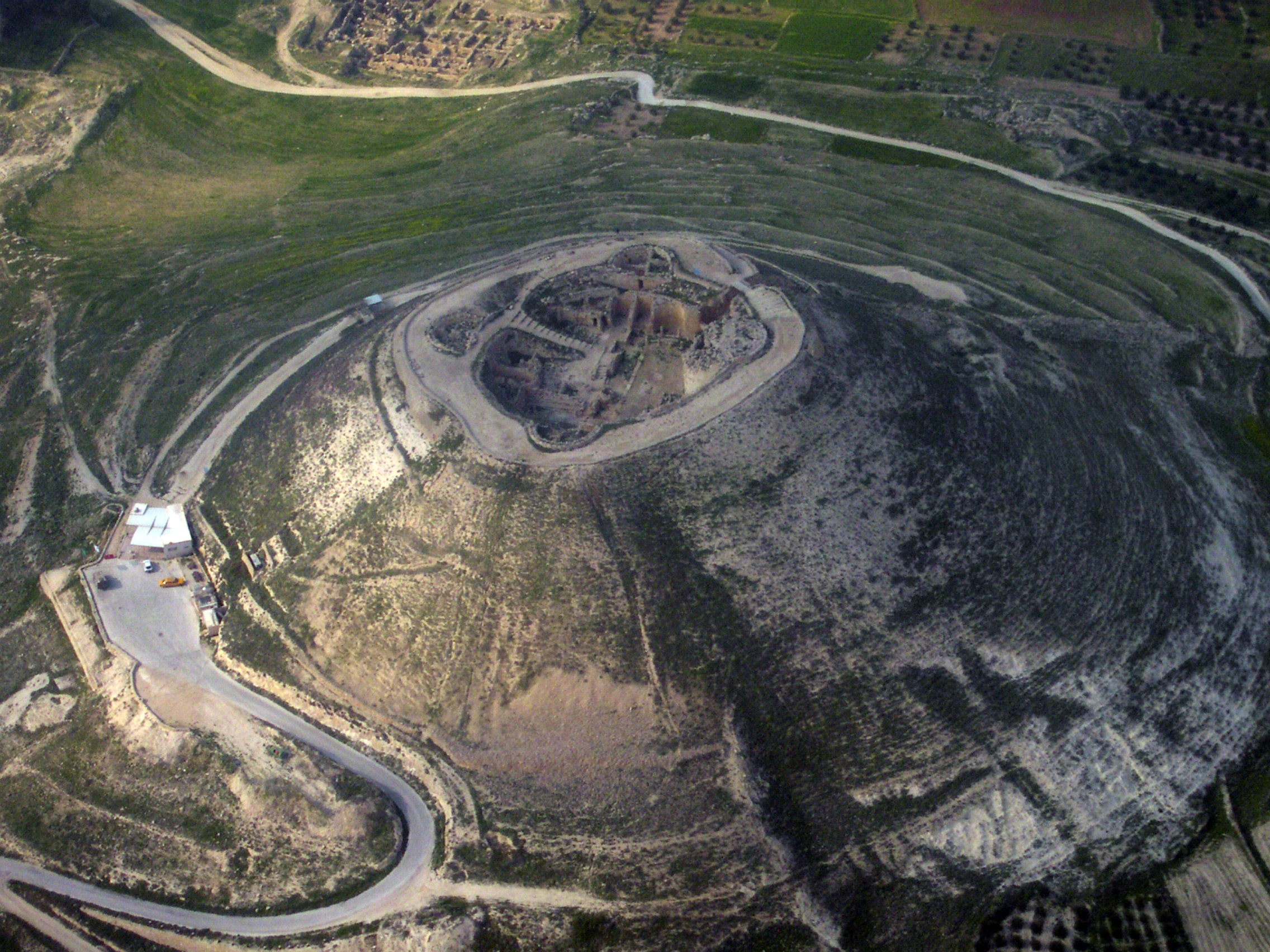
Aerial photo of Herodium from the southwest

On 7 May 2007, an Israeli team of archaeologists of Hebrew University, led by Netzer, announced they had discovered the tomb. The site is located at the exact location given by Josephus, atop tunnels and water pools, at a flattened desert site, halfway up the hill to Herodium, 12 km (7.5 mi) south of Jerusalem. The tomb contained a broken sarcophagus but no remains of a body.

Not all scholars agree with Netzer: in an article for the Palestine Exploration Quarterly, archaeologist David Jacobson (University of Oxford) wrote that "these finds are not conclusive on their own and they also raise new questions." In October 2013, archaeologists Joseph Patrich and Benjamin Arubas also challenged the identification of the tomb as that of Herod. According to Patrich and Arubas, the tomb is too modest to be Herod's and has several unlikely features. Roi Porat, who replaced Netzer as excavation leader after the latter's death, stood by the identification.

The Israel Nature and Parks Authority and the Gush Etzion Regional Council intended to recreate the tomb out of a light plastic material, a proposal that received strong criticism from major Israeli archeologists. Accordingly, the plan was later abandoned.

== Opinions of his reign ==
Macrobius (c. 400 CE), one of the last pagan writers in Rome, wrote in his book Saturnalia: "When it was heard that, as part of the slaughter of boys up to two years old, Herod, king of the Jews, had ordered his own son to be killed, [Augustus] remarked, 'It is better to be Herod's pig than his son.'" The possibly apocryphal remark employed a pun on the similarity of the Greek words for pig (hys) and son (huios), but likely referred to his (historical) slaughter of three of his sons amongst the (probably ahistorical) Massacre of the Innocents, while as a practicing Jew, he would not kill pigs.

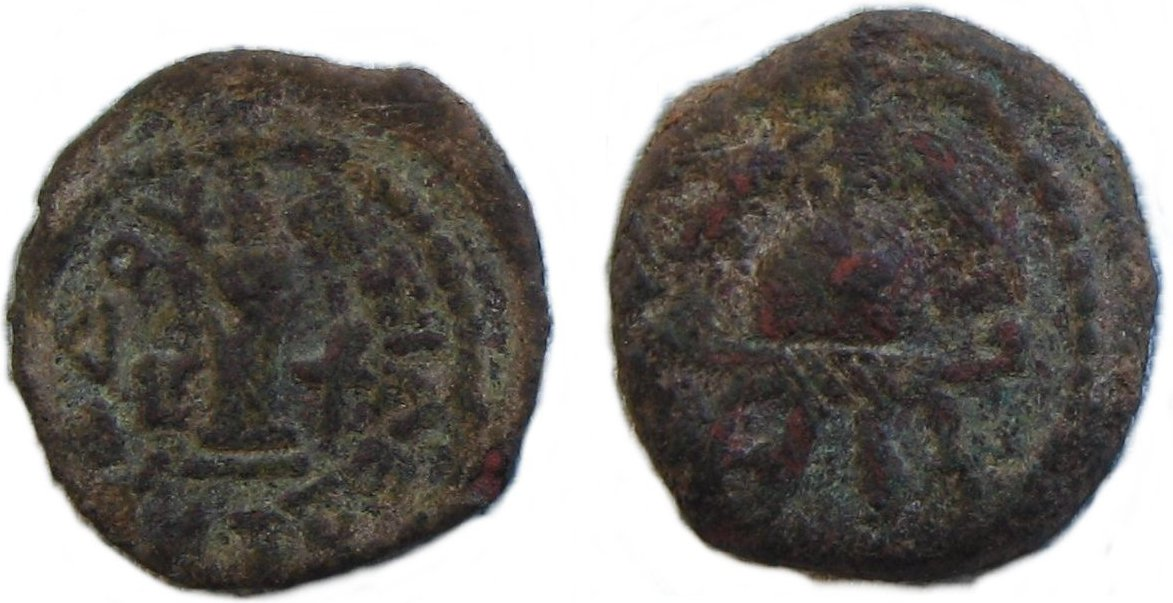
Coin of Herod the Great

According to American historian Seth Schwartz, "Herod is perhaps the only figure in ancient Jewish history who has been loathed equally by Jewish and Christian posterity," being depicted as a bloodthirsty tyrant by both Jewish and Christian leaders. The study of Herod's reign includes polarizing opinions on the man himself. Modern critics have described him as "the evil genius of the Judean nation", and as one who would be "prepared to commit any crime in order to gratify his unbounded ambition". His extraordinary spending spree is cited as one of the causes of the serious impoverishment of the people he ruled, adding to the opinion that his reign was exclusively negative. Herod's religious policies gained a mixed response from the Jewish populace. Although Herod considered himself king of the Jews, he let it be known that he also represented the non-Jews living in Judea, building temples for other religions outside of the Jewish areas of his kingdom. Many Jews questioned the authenticity of Herod's Judaism on account of his Idumean background and his infamous murders of members of his family. However, he generally respected traditional Jewish observances in his public life. For instance, he minted coins without human images to be used in Jewish areas and acknowledged the sanctity of the Second Temple by employing priests as artisans in its construction.

Along with holding some respect for the Jewish culture in his public life, there is also evidence of Herod's sensitivity toward Jewish traditions in his private life: around 40 ritual baths or mikvehs were found in several of his palaces. These mikvehs were known for being used during this time in Jewish purity rituals in which Jewish people could submerge themselves and purify their bodies without the presence of a priest. There is some speculation as to whether or not these baths were actual mikvehs as they have also been identified as stepped frigidaria or Roman cold-water baths; however, several historians have identified these baths as a combination of both types. While it has been proven that Herod showed a great amount of disrespect toward the Jewish religion, scholar Eyal Regev suggests that the presence of these ritual baths shows that Herod found ritual purity important enough in his private life to place a large number of these baths in his palaces despite his several connections to gentiles and pagan cults. These baths also show, Regev continues, that the combination of the Roman frigidaria and the Jewish mikvehs suggests that Herod sought some type of combination between the Roman and Jewish cultures, as he enjoyed the purity of Jewish tradition and the comfort of Roman luxury simultaneously.

However, he was also praised for his work, being considered the greatest builder in Jewish history, and one who "knew his place and followed [the] rules". What is left of his building ventures are now popular tourist attractions in the Middle East.

== Chronology ==
=== 39 – 20 BCE ===
- 39–37 BCE – War against Antigonus the Hasmonean begins. After the conquest of Jerusalem and victory over Antigonus, Mark Antony executes Antigonus.
- 36 BCE – Herod makes his 17-year-old brother-in-law Aristobulus III high priest, fearing that the Jews would appoint him as King of the Jews in his place.
- 35 BCE – Aristobulus III is drowned at a party on Herod's orders.
- 32 BCE – The Nabatean war begins, with victory one year later.
- 31 BCE – Judea suffers a devastating earthquake. Octavian defeats Mark Antony, and Herod switches allegiances to him.
- 30 BCE – Herod is shown great favor by Octavian, who confirms him as King of Judea at Rhodes.

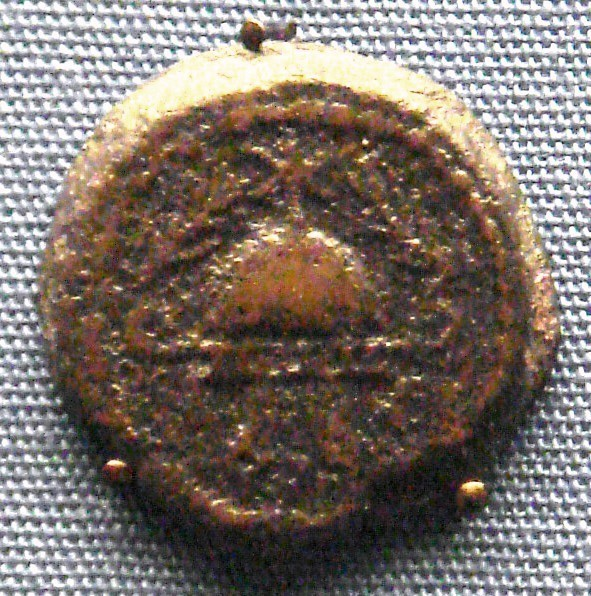
Bronze coin of Herod minted at Samaria

- 29 BCE – According to Josephus, amid Herod's great passion and jealousy concerning his wife Mariamne I, she learns of Herod's plans to murder her and stops sleeping with him. Herod charges her with adultery and puts her on trial. His sister Salome I is the primary witness against her. Mariamne's mother Alexandra makes an appearance to further incriminate her daughter. Historians speculate that Alexandra was next on Herod's list to be executed, and she only did this to save her own life. Mariamne is executed, and Alexandra declares herself Queen, stating that Herod was mentally unfit to serve. Josephus states that this is a strategic mistake, and Herod executes her without a trial.
- 28 BCE – Herod executes his brother-in-law Kostobar, husband of Salome and father to Berenice, for conspiracy. There is a large festival in Jerusalem, as Herod had built a theater and an amphitheater.
- 27 BCE – An assassination attempt on Herod is foiled. To honor now-Emperor Augustus, Herod rebuilt Samaria, and renames it Sebaste.
- 25 BCE – Herod imports grain from Egypt and starts an aid program to combat widespread hunger and disease following a massive drought. He also waives a third of taxes due. He begins construction on Caesarea Maritima and its adjoining harbor.
- 23 BCE – Herod builds a palace in Jerusalem as well as the Herodion fortress. He marries his third wife Mariamne II, the daughter of the priest Simon Boethus. Immediately, Herodes deprives Jesus, son of Fabus of the high priesthood, and confers that dignity on Simon instead.
- 22 BCE – Augustus grants Herod the regions of Trachonitis, Batanaea, and Auranitis in the northeast.
- c. 20 BCE – Expansion starts on the Temple Mount; Herod completely rebuilds the Second Temple.

=== 19 BCE – Death ===
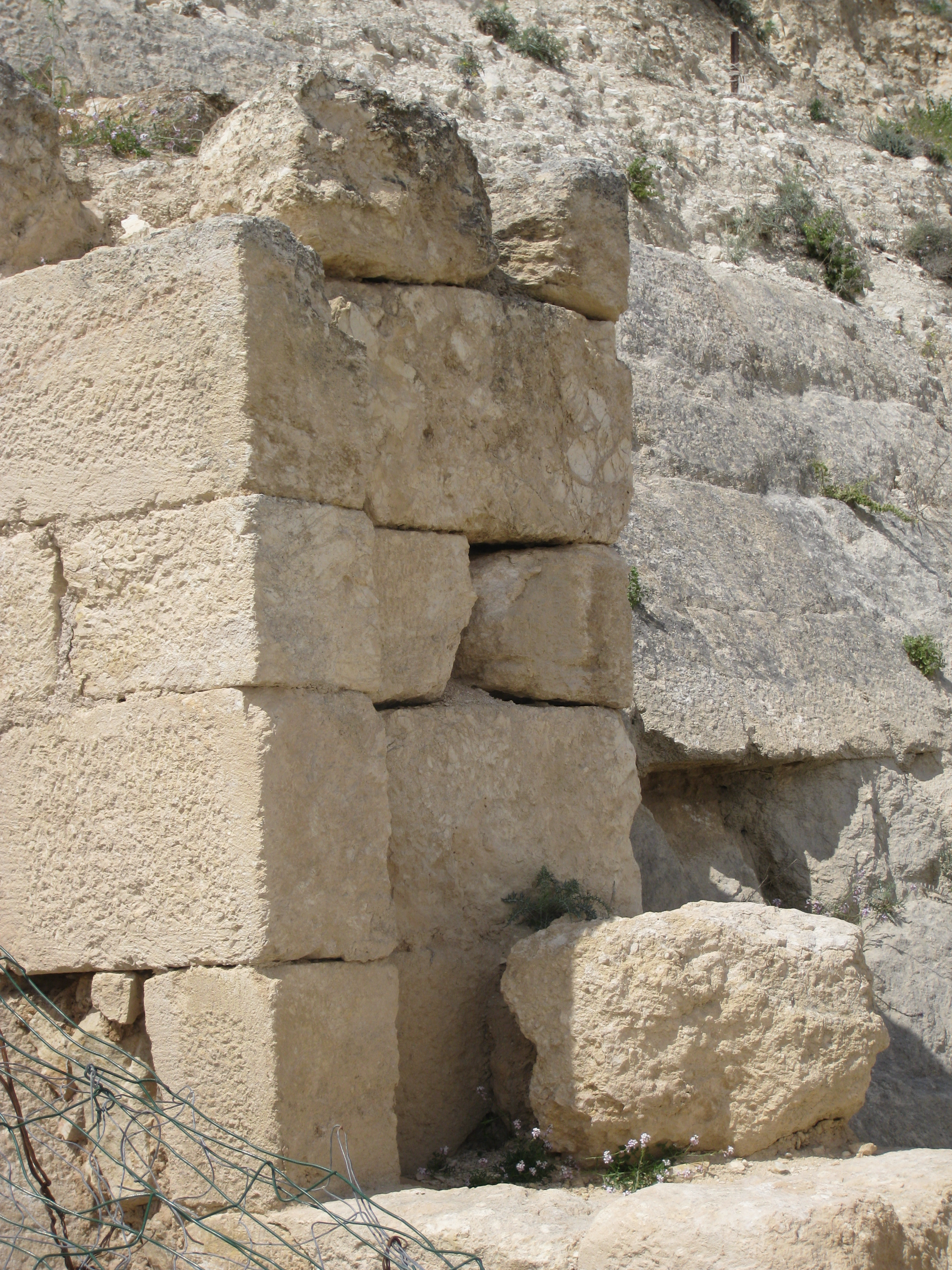
Tomb of Herod

- c. 18 BCE – Herod traveled to Rome for the second time.
- 14 BCE – Herod supports the Jews in Anatolia and Cyrene. Owing to prosperity in Judea, he waives a quarter of taxes due.
- 13 BCE – Herod makes his first-born son Antipater, by Doris, first heir in his will.
- 12 BCE – Herod suspects his sons Alexander and Aristobulus, from his marriage to Mariamne, of threatening his life. He takes them to Aquileia to be put on trial. Augustus ultimately reconciles the three. Herod supports the financially strapped Olympic Games and ensures their future. He amends his will so that Alexander and Aristobulus rise in the succession plans, but Antipater remains the primary heir.
- c. 10 BCE – The newly expanded temple in Jerusalem is inaugurated. War breaks out against the Nabateans.
- 9 BCE – Caesarea Maritima is inaugurated. Owing to the course of the Nabatean war, Herod falls out of favor with Augustus. He again suspects Alexander of plotting to kill him.
- 8 BCE – Herod accuses his sons Alexander and Aristobulus of high treason. He reconciles with Augustus, who also gives him permission to prosecute his sons.
- 7 BCE – Court hearings take place in Beirut in front of a Roman court. Alexander and Aristobulus are found guilty and executed. The succession is amended such that that Antipater becomes the exclusive successor to the throne. Herod Philip, his son by Mariamne II, is now second in the line of succession.
- 6 BCE – Herod takes action against the Pharisees.
- 5 BCE – Antipater is brought before a court, charged with plotting to murder Herod. Now seriously ill, Herod names his son Herod Antipas from his fourth marriage with Malthace as successor.
- Final year (4 or 1 BCE) – Young disciples of the Pharisees smash the golden eagle over the main entrance of the Temple after their teachers label it as an idolatrous symbol. Herod arrests them, brings them to court, and sentences them. Augustus approves the death penalty for Antipater. Herod executes his son, and changes his will again: now Herod Archelaus, from the marriage with Malthace, would rule as ethnarch over the tetrachy of Judea, while Herod Antipas by Malthace and Philip from Herod's fifth marriage with Cleopatra of Jerusalem would rule as tetrarchs over Galilee and Perea, as well as over Gaulanitis, Trachonitis, Batanaea, and Panias. Salome I was also given a small toparchy in the Gaza region. As Augustus did not confirm this revision, no one receives the title of King. However, the three sons were ultimately granted rule of the stated territories.

== Family ==
=== Wives and children ===
Herod's wives and children
Wife	Children
Doris	Son Antipater II, executed soon before Herod's death (4 or 1 BCE)
Mariamne I, daughter of Hasmonean Alexandros and Alexandra the Maccabee, executed 29 BCE	Son Alexander, executed 7 BCE; Son Aristobulus IV, executed 7 BCE; Daughter Salampsio; Daughter Cypros
Mariamne II, daughter of High-Priest Simon	Son Herod II
Malthace	Son Herod Archelaus – ethnarch; Son Herod Antipas – tetrarch; Daughter Olympias
Cleopatra of Jerusalem	Son Philip the Tetrarch; Son Herod
Pallas	Son Phasael
Phaidra	Daughter Roxanne
Elpis	Daughter Salome
A cousin (name unknown)	none known
A niece (name unknown)	none known

It is very probable that Herod had more children, especially with the last wives, and also that he had more daughters, as female births at that time were often not recorded. As polygamy (the practice of having multiple wives at once) was then permitted under Jewish law, Herod's later marriages were almost certainly polygamous.

=== Family trees ===
In part based on the tree of Rick Swartzentrover. (Note: Family Tree of Herod Rick Swartzentrover)

==== Ancestors ====
Antipater the Idumaean	Cypros (Nabatean)
Phasael	Herod the Great	Salome I	Pheroras	Joseph
Aristobulus IV	Berenice

==== Marriages and descendants ====
Herod the Great	1.Doris
Antipater II d. 4 or 1 BCE
Alexander	Alexandra
Herod the Great	2. Mariamne I; d. 29 BCE	Aristobulus III d. 35 BCE
Aristobulus IV d. 7 BCE	Berenice	Alexander d. 7 BCE	Phasael II	Salampsio	Antipater	Cypros II
Mariamne III	Herod Archelaus	Herod V	Herodias	1. Herod II; 2. Herod Antipas	Herod Agrippa I	Aristobulus Minor
Herod Agrippa II	Berenice	Mariamne	Drusilla
Simon Boethus (High Priest)
Herod the Great	3.Mariamne II
Herod II
Herod the Great	4.Malthace (Samaritan)
Aretas IV king of Arabia
1.Phasaelis	Herod Antipas	2.Herodias	Mariamne III	Herod Archelaus	Olympias	Joseph ben Joseph
Herod of Chalcis	Mariamne
Herod the Great	5.Cleopatra of Jerusalem
Philip the Tetrarch d. 34 CE	Salome

== See also ==
- Cultural depictions of Herod the Great
- Herod's Palace
- Judean date palm: Germination of 2000-year-old seed
- List of biblical figures identified in extra-biblical sources

== Notes ==
Herod the Great Herodian dynasty Born: c. 72 BCE Died: 4 or 1 BCE
Preceded by Antigonus	King of the Jews; 37 – 4 or 1 BCE	Succeeded by Herod Archelaus
Preceded by Antigonus	Ruler of Galilee; 37 – 4 or 1 BCE	Succeeded by Herod Antipas
Preceded by Antigonus	Ruler of Batanea; 37 – 4 or 1 BCE	Succeeded by Philip
Preceded by Antigonus	Ruler of Iamnia; 37 – 4 or 1 BCE	Succeeded by Salome I
