= List of wars: before 1000 =

This is a list of wars that began before 1000 AD. Other wars can be found in the historical lists of wars and the list of wars extended by diplomatic irregularity.

== Prehistoric warfare ==
Early estimate	Late estimate	Location	Associated culture
16650 BC	11450 BC	Jebel Sahaba	Qadan culture?
8550 BC	7550 BC	Nataruk	Unknown
c. 8000 BC		Arnhem Land	Aboriginal Australians
8000 BC	3500 BC	Iberian Mediterranean Basin: Morella la Vella; Les Dogue; Val del Charco del Agua Amarga	Unknown
c. 5300 BC		Els Trocs cave	Migrating Neolithic farmers / indigenous Hunter-gatherers
5207 BC	4849 BC	Schöneck-Kilianstädten	Linear Pottery culture
c. 5000 BC		Talheim	Linear Pottery culture
c. 5000 BC		Schletz	Linear Pottery culture
c. 3500 BC		Hamoukar	Uruk?
3359 BC	3105 BC	Ötztal Alps	Unknown

== c. 3400–1000 BC ==
Start	Finish	Name of Conflict	Belligerents	
Start	Finish	Name of Conflict	Victorious	Defeated
c. 3400–3100 BC		Enmerkar's campaigns against Aratta*	Uruk under Enmerkar	Aratta
c. 3250 BC		Unification of Upper Egypt*	Thinite Confederacy under Scorpion I	Rival city-states of Upper Egypt, incl. Taurus (Bull)
c. 3200 BC		Naqada III northern expansion	Naqada III	Maadi-Buto culture
c. 3100 BC		Upper Egypt annexation of Lower Egypt*	Upper Egypt under Narmer	Lower Egypt under Wash
c. 3100 BC		Burning of Arslantepe	Kura–Araxes	Arslantepe
c. 3100 BC		Hor-Aha's Nubia Campaign*	Egypt	Nubia
c. 3000 BC		Djer's campaigns into Sinai	Egypt	Setjet
c. 3000 BC		Djer's campaigns into Libya	Egypt	Tjehenu
c. 2970 BC		Den's Eastern Campaign	Egypt	Setjet
c. 2900 BC		Civil war between Horus Bird and Sneferka	Reconciliation under Hotepsekhemwy	
c. 2900 BC – 2700 BC		Kish-Elam War*	Kish under Enmebaragesi	Elam
c. 2760-2740 BC		Second Dynasty Civil War	Khasekhemwy	Lower Egypt
c. 2600 BC		Aga's Siege of Uruk	Uruk under Gilgamesh	Kish under Aga
c. 2600 BC		Campaigns of Sneferu	Egypt	Nubia; Libya; Levant
c. 2500 BC		Campaigns of Ur-Nanshe	Lagash	Ur; Umma
c. 2450 BC		Campaigns of Eannatum	Lagash	Ur; Uruk; Larsa; Nippur; Akshak; Umma and others
c. 2440 BC		Campaigns of Enshakushanna	Uruk	Hamazi; Akkad; Kish; Nippur
c. 2423 BC	c. 2300 BC	Mari-Ebla War	Mari	Ebla; Nagar; Emar; Kish; Armi
c. 2400 BC		Umma's first war of independence*	Lagash under Enannatum I	Umma under Ur-Lumma
c. 2365 BC		Lugal-Anne-Mundu's campaign on Ur	Adab	Ur
c. 2400 BC	c. 2400 BC	Umma's second war of independence	Lagash; Uruk	Umma
c. 2350 BC	c. 2350 BC	Campaigns of Lugal-zage-si	Umma	Kish; Lagash; Ur; Nippur; Larsa; Uruk
Late 24th century BC		Formation of the Akkadian Empire	Akkad; Kish (after being conquered)	Kish (before being conquered); Lagash; Uruk; Umma; Ur; Kazallu
Early 23rd century BC		Sargon's campaigns northeast of the Akkadian Empire	Akkad	Mari; Yarmuti; Ebla
Early 23rd century BC		Sargon's invasion of Elam	Akkad	Elam; Susa; Marhasi
c. 2230 BC	c. 2230 BC	Naram-Sin's campaign on the Lullubi	Akkad	Lullubi
c. 2220 BC	c. 2150 BC	Gutian raids and conquests in the Akkadian Empire	Gutium	Akkad
c. 2100 BC	c. 2100 BC	Gutian conquest of Elam	Gutium	Elam
c. 2119 BC	c. 2119 BC	Fall of the Gutian dynasty	Uruk	Gutium
c. 2112 BC	c. 2112 BC	Ur-Nammu's conquest of Lagash	Ur	Lagash
c. 2004 BC	c. 2004 BC	Fall of the Neo-Sumerian Empire	Elam; Susa	Ur
c. 2000 BC	c. 2000 BC	War in Persenbet	Segerseni	Unclear
c. 1822 BC	c. 1763 BC	Campaigns of Rim-Sin I	Larsa	Uruk; Isin; Der; Babylon; Sutum; Rapiqum
c. 1801 BC	c. 1770 BC	Elam's Invasion into Mesopotamia	Elam; Babylon Mari	Eshnunna; Minor city states
c. 1765 BC	c. 1764 BC	Elamite War	Babylon; Mari; Yamhad	Elam
c. 1763 BC	c. 1763 BC	Hammurabi's Conquest on Larsa	Babylon; Yamhad; Mari	Larsa
c. 1760 BC	c. 1760 BC	Hammurabi's Conquests in the North	Babylon	Mari; Minor city states
c. 1760 BC	c. 1760 BC	Hammurabi's War with Assyria	Babylon; Minor city states	Assyria; Minor city states
c. 1742 BC	c. 1739 BC	Babylonian Rebellion	Babylon	Babylonian rebels
c. 1740 BC	c. 1570 BC	Kassite invasions into Babylon	Kassites	Babylon; Remnants of the Babylonian Empire (after c. 1595 BC)
c. 1732 BC	c. 1732 BC	Puzur-Sin's Uprising	Assyria	Amorites; Babylon
c. 1732 BC	c. 1726 or 1720 BC	Assyrian Civil War	Troops of Adasi	Troops of Puzur-Sin; Troops of Ashur-apla-idi; Troops of Nasir-Sin; Troops of Sin-namir; Troops of Ipqi-Ishtar; Troops of Adad-salulu; Amorites; Babylon
c. 1732 BC	c. 1732 BC	Foundation of the Sealand dynasty	Troops of Ilum-ma-ili	Babylon
c. 1700 BC	c. 1700 BC	Babylonian Attack on the Sealand Dynasty	Sealand dynasty	Babylon
c. 1650 BC	c. 1620 BC	Campaigns of Hattusili I	Hittite Empire	Alalakh; Arzawa; Hurrians; Smaller Syrian city states
c. 1600 BC	c. 1600 BC	Xia–Shang War	Shang Rebel Forces	Xia dynasty
c. 1600 BC	c. 1595 BC	Campaigns of Mursili I	Hittite Empire	Yamhad; Babylon; Smaller Syrian city states
c. 1595 BC	c. 1595 BC	Sack of Babylon	Hittite Empire	Babylon
c. 1523 BC	c. 1517 BC	Conquest of the Hyksos	Egypt	Hyksos
c. 1506 BC	c. 1502 BC	Campaigns of Thutmose I	Egyptian Empire	Nubia
c. 1493 BC	before c. 1479 BC	Campaigns of Thutmose II	Egyptian Empire	Nubia; Shasu
c. 1457 BC	c. 1456 BC	Thutmose III's First Syria Campaign*	Egyptian Empire	Canaan; Kadesh; Megiddo; Mitanni
c. 1456 BC	c. 1455 BC	Thutmose III's Second Syria Campaign*	Egyptian Empire	Canaan; Retjenu
c. 1455 BC	c. 1454 BC	Thutmose III's Third Syria Campaign*	Egyptian Empire	Canaan; Retjenu
c. 1454 BC	c. 1453 BC	Thutmose III's Fourth Syria Campaign*	Egyptian Empire	Canaan; Retjenu
c. 1450 BC	c. 1449 BC	Thutmose III's Fifth Syria Campaign*	Egyptian Empire	Canaan; Retjenu; Kadesh; Tunip; Phoenicia
c. 1449 BC	c. 1448 BC	Thutmose III's Sixth Syria Campaign*	Egyptian Empire	Byblos; Retjenu; Kadesh
c. 1448 BC	c. 1447 BC	Thutmose III's Seventh Syria Campaign*	Egyptian Empire	Retjenu; Phoenicia
c. 1447 BC	c. 1446 BC	Thutmose III's Attack on Mitanni (Eighth Syria Campaign)*	Egyptian Empire	Mitanni
c. 1445 BC	c. 1444 BC	Thutmose III's Ninth Syria Campaign*	Egyptian Empire	Nuhašše
c. 1444 BC	c. 1443 BC	Thutmose III's Tenth Syria Campaign*	Egyptian Empire	Mitanni
c. 1443 BC	c. 1442 BC	Thutmose III's Eleventh Syria Campaign*	Egyptian Empire	Unknown
c. 1442 BC	c. 1441 BC	Thutmose III's Twelfth Syria Campaign*	Egyptian Empire	Unknown
c. 1441 BC	c. 1440 BC	Thutmose III's Thirteenth Syria Campaign*	Egyptian Empire	Nuhašše
c. 1440 BC	c. 1439 BC	Thutmose III's Fourteenth Syria Campaign*	Egyptian Empire	Shasu
c. 1439 BC	c. 1438 BC	Thutmose III's Fifteenth Syria Campaign*	Egyptian Empire	Unknown
c. 1438 BC	c. 1437 BC	Thutmose III's Sixteenth Syria Campaign*	Egyptian Empire	Unknown
c. 1437 BC	c. 1436 BC	Thutmose III's Seventeenth Syria Campaign*	Egyptian Empire	Mitanni; Tunip; Kadesh
c. 1430 BC	c. 1200 BC	Kaska invasions into the Hittite Empire	Hittite Empire	Kaska; Azzi-Hayasa; Mushki
c. 1429 BC	c. 1428 BC	Thutmose III's Nubian Campaign*	Egyptian Empire	Nubia
c. 14th century BC		Battle of the Ten Kings	Trtsu-Bharata	Alina; Anu; Bhrigus; Bhalanas; Dasa; Druhyus; Mātsyeyas; Persians; Puru; Panis
c. 1400 BC	c. 1350 BC	Hittite Wars of Survival	The Hittites	Kaska; Hayasa-Azzi; Isuwa; Arzawa
c. 1345 BC	c. 1345 BC	Great Syrian War	The Hittites	Mitanni
c. 1315 BC	c. 1315 BC	Arzawa Revolt	Arzawa; Ahhiyawa	Hittite Empire
c. 1276 BC	c. 1275 BC	Ramesses II's First Syrian Campaign	Egypt	Canaan; Amurru kingdom
c. 1274 BC	c. 1274 BC	Ramesses II's Second Syrian campaign	Hittite Empire	New Kingdom of Egypt
c. 1270 BC	c. 1270 BC	Ramesses II's Third Syrian Campaign	Egypt	Hittite Empire
c. 1270 BC	c. 1269 BC	Ramesses II's Later Syrian Campaigns	New Kingdom of Egypt	Hittite Empire
c. 1267 BC	c. 1267 BC	Hittite Civil War of 1267 B.C.	Hattusili III	Mursili III
c. 1260 BC	c. 1260 BC	Ramesses II's Nubian Campaigns	Egypt	Nubia
c. 1260 BC	c. 1255 BC	Piyama-Radu Revolt	Piyama-Radu; Ahhiyawa	Hittite Empire
c. 1250 BC	c. 1250 BC	Ramesses II's Libyan Campaigns	Egypt	Libya
c. 1235 BC	c. 1235 BC	Babylonian–Assyrian War of 1235 BC	Assyria	Babylonia
c. 1206 BC	c. 1150 BC	Late Bronze Age collapse	Sea peoples	Hittites; New Kingdom of Egypt; Mycenaean Greece
c. 1203 BC	c. 1187 BC	Wars of succession in 19th Dynasty Egypt	Setnakhte	Amenmesse, Seti II and Tausret
c. 1194 BC	c. 1184 BC	Trojan War	Achaeans (mainly Mycenaens and Spartans)	Troy
c. 1190 BC	c. 1190 BC	Destruction of Ugarit	Unknown (probably the Sea Peoples)	Ugarit
c. 1184–1155 BC		Elamite invasion of Babylonia	Elam	Babylonia
c. 1110 BC	c. 1110 BC	Babylonian War with Elam	Babylonia	Elam
c. 1100 BC	c. 1100 BC	Kurukshetra war	Forces of Pandavas under Yudhishthira	Forces of Kauravas under Duryodhana
c. 1046 BC	c. 1046 BC	Shang–Zhou War	Zhou rebel forces	Shang dynasty
c. 1042 BC	c. 1039 BC	Rebellion of the Three Guards	King Cheng of Zhou	Shu Du of Cai

== 999 BC – 1 BC ==
Start	Finish	Name of Conflict	Belligerents	
Start	Finish	Name of Conflict	Victorious	Defeated
854 BC	846 BC	Assyrian conquest of Aram	Assyrian Empire	Aram
757 BC	723 BC	Colchis conquer Diauehi	Colchis	Diauehi
752 BC	752 BC	Wars with the Latins and the Sabines (for the Rape of the Sabine Women)	Roman Kingdom	Sabines
During the reign of Romulus (Between 753 and 716 BC)		Conquest of Cameria	Roman Kingdom	Cameria
During the reign of Romulus (Between 753 and 716 BC)		War with Fidenae and Veii	Roman Kingdom	Fidenae; Veii
740 BC	720 BC	First Messenian War	Sparta	Messenia
736 BC	732 BC	Syro-Ephraimite War	Assyrian Empire; Kingdom of Judah	Aram; Kingdom of Israel
733 BC	733 BC	Israelite–Aramean War	Kingdom of Judah	Israel; Edom; Philistia
732 BC	Before 721 BC	Nubian Conquest of Egypt	Nubia; Upper Egypt; Hermopolis	Middle Egypt; Lower Egypt
725 BC	725 BC	Colchian–Scythian war	Colchis	Scythia; Cimmerians
722 BC	481 BC	Wars of the Chinese Spring and Autumn period	Han; Wei; Zhao; Qin; Chu; Qi; Yan; Those were the remaining major states	Smaller states (consumed by other states)
714 BC	After 706 BC	Urartu–Assyria War	Neo-Assyrian Empire	Urartu
710 BC	650 BC	Lelantine War	Eretria and allies	Chalcis and allies
703 BC	689 BC	Sennacherib's War with Babylon	Neo-Assyrian Empire	Babylonia; Chaldea; Aramaea; Elam
701 BC	701 BC	Sennacherib's campaign in Judah	Kingdom of Judah; Kushite Egypt	Neo-Assyrian Empire
685 BC	668 BC	Second Messenian War	Sparta; Corinth; Lepreo; Cretan mercenaries	Messenia; Arcadia; Sicyon; Elis; Argos
During the reign of Tullus Hostilius (Between 672 and 640 BC)		Second War with Fidenae and Veii	Roman Kingdom	Fidenae; Veii
During the reign of Tullus Hostilius (Between 672 and 640 BC)		Second Sabine War	Roman Kingdom	Sabines
676 BC	676 BC	Mannaean-Assyrian War	Neo-Assyrian Empire	Mannaea
671 BC	After 664 BC	Esarhaddon's War against Egypt	Neo-Assyrian Empire	Egypt; Kingdom of Kush
669 BC		Battle of Hysiae	Argos	Sparta
655 BC	639 BC	Assyrian conquest of Elam	Neo-Assyrian Empire	Elam
652 BC	648 or 646 BC	Shamash-shum-ukin's Civil War	Neo-Assyrian Empire	Assyrian Babylon; Mesopotamian Sealands; Elam; Chaldea; Guti; Amurru kingdom Meluhha; Arab tribes
643 BC	642 BC	War of Qi's succession	Faction of Prince Zhao	Faction of Prince Wukui; Faction of Prince Pan; Faction of Prince Shangren; Faction of Prince Yuan; Faction of Prince Yong (Qi); Supported by: Lu; Beidi
642 BC	338 BC	Roman-Latin wars	Roman Kingdom; Roman Republic	Latins
632 BC	632 BC	Cylonian Affair	Athens	Cylon of Athens; Megara
626 BC	626 BC	Revolt of Babylon	Babylonia	Neo-Assyrian Empire
625 BC	615 BC	Lydian–Milesian War	Lydia	Miletus
614 BC	614 BC	Fall of Assur	Neo-Babylonian Empire; Media	Neo-Assyrian Empire
c. 612 BC	c. 612 BC	Battle of Nineveh	Medes (including: Persians and Elamites); Scythians; Neo-Babylonian Empire; Chaldea; Cimmerians	Neo-Assyrian Empire
610 BC	609 BC	Fall of Harran	Neo-Babylonian Empire; Media	Neo-Assyrian Empire
c. 605 BC	c. 605 BC	Battle of Carchemish	Neo-Babylonian Empire	Egypt; Remnants of the Neo-Assyrian Empire
601 BC	586 BC	Jewish–Babylonian war	Neo-Babylonian Empire; Moab; Ammon; Chaldea	Kingdom of Judah
590 BC	585 BC	Median-Lydian war (Battle of the Eclipse)	Medes	Lydia
Before 588 BC		Tarquin the Elder's war with the Latins	Roman Kingdom	Latin League
595 BC	585 BC	First Sacred War	Amphictyonic League of Delphi; Sicyon	Kirrha
Before 585 BC	585 BC	Tarquin the Elder's war with the Sabines	Roman Kingdom	Sabines
Between 560 BC and 540 BC		Achaemenid Colchis war	Achaemenid Empire	Colchis
c. 570 BC		Battle of the Well of Thestis	Cyrenaica	Egypt
552 BC	539 BC	Wars of Cyrus the Great	Persis/Achaemenid Empire of Persia	Median Empire; Neo-Babylonian Empire; Lydian Empire; Gandhara Empire; Sogdiana
552 BC	550 BC	Persian Revolt; Part of the Wars of Cyrus the Great	(Achaemenid Empire) Persis	Median Empire
550 BC		Battle of the Fetters	Tegea	Sparta
547 BC	547 BC	Cyrus' Conquest of the Lydian Empire; Part of the Wars of Cyrus the Great	Achaemenid Empire	Lydia
546 BC		Battle of Pallene	Peisistratos	Athens
546 BC		Battle of the 300 Champions	Sparta	Argos
540 BC	539 BC	Cyrus' Conquest of Elam; Part of the Wars of Cyrus the Great	Achaemenid Empire	Elam
540 BC		Battle of Alalia	Carthage; Etruscans	Phocaeans
539 BC	539 BC	Cyrus' Conquest of Babylonia; Part of the Wars of Cyrus the Great	Achaemenid Empire	Neo-Babylonian Empire
Between 540 and 535 BC		Battle of Alalia	Carthage; Etruscans	Greek Phocaean; Colonies of Alalia
518 BC	518 BC	Achaemenid invasion of the Indus Valley	Achaemenid Empire	Gandhara; Kambojas
508 BC	507 BC	Athenian Revolution	Athens	Isagoras; Peloponnesian League
499 BC	494 BC	Ionian Revolt; Part of the Persian Wars	Achaemenid Empire	Ionia; Aeolis; Doris; Caria; Athens; Eretria; Cyprus
499 BC	448 BC	Greco-Persian Wars	Greek city states: Athens; Sparta; Thespians; Thebans; Other Greek Forces; Cyprus; Delian League; Other pro-Greek Forces	Achaemenid Empire; Other pro-Persian Forces
498 BC	493 BC	Latin War (498–493 BC)	Roman Republic	Latin League
492 BC	490 BC	First Persian invasion of Greece; Part of the Persian Wars	Achaemenid Empire	Ionia; Aeolis; Doris; Caria; Athens; Eretria; Cyprus
484 BC	484 BC	Babylonian revolts (484 BC)	Achaemenid Empire	Babylonian Cities
480 BC	479 BC	Second Persian invasion of Greece; Part of the Persian Wars	Greek city states led by Athens and Sparta	Persian Empire
487 BC	448 BC	Greek counterattack Part of the Persian Wars	Greek city states led by Athens and Sparta	Persian Empire
480 BC	480 BC	First Sicilian campaign (Battle of Himera); Part of the Sicilian Wars	Syracuse; Agrigentum	Carthage
478 BC	449 BC	Wars of the Delian League	Delian League; Egyptian rebels (until 454 BC)	Persian Empire
478 BC	478 BC	Siege of Byzantion (478 BC); Part of the Wars of the Delian League	Delian League	Persian Empire
477 BC	477 BC	Battle of the Cremera	Veii	Roman Republic
477 BC	463 BC	Delian campaigns in Thrace; Part of the Wars of the Delian League	Delian League; Sparta (partially)	Persian Empire
475 BC	221 BC	Wars of Warring States period in China	Seven Warring States	Seven Warring States
475 BC	475 BC	Conquest of Skyros	Delian League	Dolopian pirates
475 BC	475 BC	Subjugation of Carystus	Delian League	Carystus
474 BC	474 BC	Battle of Cumae	Syracuse; Cumae	Etruscans
472 BC	471 BC	Subjugation of Naxos	Athens	Naxos
469 BC	466 BC	Delian campaigns in Caria; Part of the Wars of the Delian League	Delian League	Persian Empire
468 BC	468 BC	Attack on Phaselis	Delian League	Phaselis
465 BC	463 BC	Siege of Thasos	Athens	Thasos
465 BC	464 BC	Campaign at the Nine Ways	Thrace	Delian League
464 BC	464 BC	Helot Revolt during the 464 BC Sparta earthquake	Sparta; Peloponnesian League	Helots; Perioeci
460 BC	445 BC	First Peloponnesian War	Delian League led by Athens, Argos	Peloponnesian League led by Sparta, Thebes
460 BC	454 BC	Rebellion of Inaros II; Part of the Wars of the Delian League	Persian Empire (Achaemenid Empire) XXVII Dynasty of Egypt	Egyptian rebels led by Inaros II; Delian League
460 BC	457 BC	Siege of Aegina; Part of the First Peloponnesian War	Athens	Aegina Supported by: Peloponnesian League
450 BC	450 BC	Cimon's Campaign in Cyprus; Part of the Wars of the Delian League	Persian Empire	Delian League led by Cimon
449 BC	448 BC	Second Sacred War; Part of the First Peloponnesian War	Phocis	Sparta; Delphi
446 BC	446 BC	Euboean Revolt of 446 BC; Part of the First Peloponnesian War	Euboea	Athens
446 BC	445 BC	Megara Revolt against the Delian League; Part of the First Peloponnesian War	Megara; Peloponnesian League	Athens
440 BC	440 BC	Samian War	Athens	Samos
431 BC	404 BC	Peloponnesian War	Peloponnesian League	Delian League
411 BC	411 BC	Athenian coup of 411 BC	The Four Hundred	Athens
410 BC	340 BC	Second Sicilian War; Part of the Sicilian Wars	Syracuse; Corinth; Sparta	Athens; Delian League; Segesta
395 BC	387 BC	Corinthian War	Athens; Argos; Corinth; Thebes; Persian Empire; Other allies	Sparta; Peloponnesian League
390 BC (traditional); 387 BC (probable)		Battle of the Allia	Gauls	Roman Republic
385 BC	385 BC	Artaxerxes' II Cadusian Campaign	Cadusii	Persian Empire
385 BC	385 BC	Dardanian invasion of Epirus	Kingdom of Dardania; Supported by: Syracuse	Molossia Sparta; Supported by: Thessaly Macedonia
382 BC	379 BC	First Olynthian War	Peloponnesian League; Macedonia	Chalcidian League
378 BC	372 BC	Boeotian War	Thebes; Athens	Sparta
372 BC	362 BC	Revolt of the Satraps	Achaemenid Empire	Rebel satrapies
371 BC	371 BC	First Spartan Revolt against the Boeotian League	Boeotian League	Sparta
362 BC	362 BC	Second Spartan Revolt against the Boeotian League	Boeotian League led by Thebes	Sparta; Athens; Elis; Mantineia
360 BC	360 BC	Perdiccas III's expedition in Upper Macedonia	Kingdom of Dardania	Macedonia
358 BC	336 BC	Wars of the Rise of Macedon	Macedon	Greek city states; Illyrians; Thracians
357 BC	355 BC	Social War	Chios; Rhodes; Kos; Byzantion	Second Athenian League
356 BC	346 BC	Third Sacred War	Amphictyonic League	Phocis; Pherae; Athens; Sparta
343 BC	341 BC	First Samnite War; Part of the Samnite Wars	Roman Republic; Sidicini; Campanians	Samnites
340 BC	338 BC	Latin War	Roman Republic; Samnites	Latin League; Campanians; Volsci; Sidicini; Aurunci
339 BC	338 BC	Philip II's campaign in Greece (Fourth Sacred War)	Macedon	Athens; Thebes; Corinth; Megara; Achaea; Chalcis; Epidaurus; Troezen
339 BC	304 BC	Second Samnite War; Part of the Samnite Wars	Roman Republic; Volsci	Samnites; Sidicini; Aurunci; Ausoni; Vestini
334 BC	323 BC	Wars of Alexander the Great	Macedon	Persian Empire; Pauravas; Greek city states Thrace; Getae; Sogdiana
332 BC	331 BC	Rebellion against Macedonian Rule	Macedon	Sparta; Thracian tribes
323 BC	322 BC	Lamian War	Macedon	Athens; Aetolian League; Achaean League; Arcadians; Corinth
321 BC	320 BC	Conquest of the Nanda Empire	Maurya Empire	Nanda Empire
315 BC	307 BC	Third Sicilian campaign Part of the Sicilian Wars	Carthage	Syracuse
312 BC	312 BC	Antigonid–Nabataean confrontations Part of the Wars of the Diadochi	Nabataean Kingdom	Antigonid dynasty
311 BC	309 BC	Babylonian War; Part of the Wars of the Diadochi	Seleucid Empire	Antigonid dynasty
311 BC	309 BC	Bosporan Civil War	The Siraceni	Bosporans; Scythians
305 BC	304 BC	Siege of Rhodes; Part of the Wars of the Diadochi	Rhodes; Ptolemaic Kingdom; Seleucid Empire	Antigonid dynasty
305 BC	303 BC	Seleucid-Mauryan War	Maurya Empire	Seleucid Empire
c. 300 BC	c. 300 BC	Gojoseon–Yan War	Yan	Gojoseon
298 BC	290 BC	Third Samnite War; Part of the Samnite Wars	Roman Republic	Samnites; Etruscans
281 BC	279 BC	Gallic invasion of the Balkans	Aetolian League; Illyrians; Macedon; Thracians; Paeonians	Gauls
280 BC	275 BC	Pyrrhic War	Roman Republic; Carthage	Epirus; Magna Graecia; Samnium
274 BC	200 BC	Syrian Wars	Seleucid Empire; Macedon	Ptolemaic Kingdom
274 BC	271 BC	First Syrian War; Part of the Syrian Wars	Ptolemaic Kingdom	Seleucid Empire
267 BC	261 BC	Chremonidean War	Macedon	Greek states, notably Athens and Sparta; Ptolemaic Egypt
265 BC	263 BC	Kalinga War	Maurya Empire	Kalinga
264 BC	146 BC	Punic Wars	Roman Republic	Carthage
264 BC	241 BC	First Punic War; Part of the Punic Wars	Roman Republic	Carthage
260 BC	255 BC	Second Syrian War; Part of the Syrian Wars	Antigonid Macedonia	Ptolemaic Egypt
245 BC	241 BC	Third Syrian War; Part of the Syrian Wars	Ptolemaic Kingdom	Seleucid Empire
240 BC	238 BC	Mercenary War	Carthage	Carthage's mercenary army of the First Punic War; Libyans; Numidians
238 BC	238 BC	Parni conquest of Parthia	Parni	Parthia
237 BC	219 BC	Barcid conquest of Hispania	Carthage	Turdetani; Bastetani; Greek colonists Germani; Tartessian tribes Celtiberian tribes
c. 230 BC	c. 220 BC	Overthrow of Diodotus II	Troops of Euthydemus I	Greco-Bactrian Kingdom
230 BC	221 BC	Qin's wars of unification	Qin	Han; Zhao; Dai; Yan; Wei; Chu; Qi
230 BC	230 BC	Conquest of Han; Part of the Qin wars of unification	Qin	Han
229 BC	228 BC	First Illyrian War	Roman Republic	Ardiaei
229 BC	222 BC	Cleomenean War	Achaean League; Macedon	Sparta; Elis
228 BC	228 BC	Conquest of Zhao; Part of the Qin wars of unification	Qin	Zhao
226 BC	226 BC	First Conquest of Yan; Part of the Qin wars of unification	Qin	Yan
225 BC	222 BC	Bella Gallica cisalpina	Roman Republic	Celts; Gauls
225 BC	225 BC	Conquest of Wei; Part of the Qin wars of unification	Qin	Wei
225 BC	223 BC	Conquest of Chu; Part of the Qin wars of unification	Qin	Chu
222 BC	222 BC	Second Conquest of Yan; Part of the Qin wars of unification	Qin	Yan
222 BC	222 BC	Conquest of Dai; Part of the Qin wars of unification	Qin	Dai
222 BC	222 BC	Conquest of Wu; Part of the Qin wars of unification	Qin	Wu
221 BC	221 BC	Conquest of Qi; Part of the Qin wars of unification	Qin	Qi
220 BC	219 BC	Second Illyrian War	Roman Republic	Illyria
220 BC	220 BC	Lyttian War	Polyrrhenia; Lyctus; Lappa; Macedonia; Achaean League	Knossos; Gortys; Kydonia; Rhodes; Aetolian League
219 BC	217 BC	Fourth Syrian War; Part of the Syrian Wars	Ptolemaic Kingdom	Seleucid Empire
218 BC	201 BC	Second Punic War; Part of the Punic Wars	Roman Republic	Carthage
215 BC	215 BC	Qin's campaign against the Xiongnu	Qin dynasty	Xiongnu
215 BC	168 BC	Macedonian Wars	Roman Republic	Macedonian Empire
215 BC	205 BC	First Macedonian War; Part of the Macedonian Wars	Roman Republic; Aetolian League; Pergamon; Sparta; Elis; Messenia	Macedonia; Achaean League
214 BC	214 BC	Qin's campaign against the Yue tribes	Qin dynasty	Baiyue
c. 210 BC	c. 206 BC	Seleucid invasion of Bactria	Greco-Bactrian Kingdom	Seleucid Empire
209 BC	206 BC	Fall of the Qin dynasty	Rebel forces of the six states	Qin dynasty
209 BC	209 BC	Dazexiang uprising Part of the Fall of the Qin dynasty	Qin dynasty	Chen Sheng's and Wu Guang's troops revived Kingdom of Chu peasants
209 BC	208 BC	Xiang Liang's Rebellion; Part of the Fall of the Qin dynasty	Qin dynasty	Xiang Liang's troops Kuaiji revived Kingdom of Chu
209 BC	206 BC	Liu Bang's Insurrection against the Qin dynasty Part of the Fall of the Qin dynasty	Liu Bang's troops Yan; Zhao; Qi; Wei	Qin dynasty
209 BC	88 BC	Seleucid–Parthian wars	Parthian Empire	Seleucid Empire
208 BC	c. 206 BC	Siege of Bactra; Part of the Seleucid invasion of Bactria	Greco-Bactrian Kingdom	Seleucid Empire
206 BC	202 BC	Chu-Han contention	Han	Western Chu
205 BC	200 BC	Cretan War	Rhodes; Pergamum; Byzantium; Cyzicus; Athens; Knossos	Macedon; Hierapytna; Olous; Aetolia; Spartan pirates Acarnania
202 BC	200 BC	Fifth Syrian War; Part of the Syrian Wars	Seleucid Empire	Ptolemaic Egypt
200 BC	196 BC	Second Macedonian War; Part of the Macedonian Wars	Roman Republic; Pergamon; Rhodes	Macedon
200 BC	198 BC	Han invasion of the Xiongnu	Xiongnu	Han dynasty
195 BC	195 BC	Roman-Spartan War	Roman Republic; Achaean League; Macedon; Pergamum; Rhodes	Sparta
191 BC	188 BC	Roman-Syrian War	Roman Republic; Achaean League; Macedon; Pergamum; Rhodes	Seleucid Empire; Aetolian League; Athamania
189 BC	189 BC	Galatian War	Roman Republic; Pergamum	Galatia
180 BC	175 BC	Bactrian Expansion into India	Shunga Empire	Greco-Bactrian Kingdom; Remnants of the Maurya Empire
179 BC	175 BC	Dardanian–Bastarnic war	Kingdom of Dardania	Bastarnae Supported by: Kingdom of Macedonia; Odrysian Kingdom; Scordisci
171 BC	168 BC	Third Macedonian War; Part of the Macedonian Wars	Roman Republic; Pergamon	Macedon
170 BC	170 BC	Usurpation of Eucratides	Troops of Eucratides I	Greco-Bactrian Kingdom
c. 167 BC	c. 167 BC	Parthian invasion into Bactria	Parthian Empire; Loyalists to the Euthydemid dynasty	Greco-Bactrian Kingdom
167 BC	160 BC	Maccabean Revolt	Judea	Seleucid Empire
162 BC	c. 70 BC	Nomadic invasions into Bactria	Yuezhi; Scythians, mainly the Saka; Wusun	Greco-Bactrian Kingdom
155 BC	139 BC	Lusitanian War	Roman Republic	Lusitanian tribes
154 BC	154 BC	Rebellion of the Seven States	Han dynasty	Wu; Chu; Zhao; Jiaoxi; Jiaodong; Zichuan; Jinan
149 BC	146 BC	Third Punic War; Part of the Punic Wars	Roman Republic	Carthage
138 BC	111 BC	Han campaigns against Minyue; Part of the Han wars against the Baiyue	Han dynasty	Minyue
135 BC	71 BC	Roman Servile Wars	Roman Republic	Revolting slaves
135 BC	132 BC	First Servile War; Part of the Roman Servile Wars	Roman Republic	Slaves of Sicily
133 BC	89 AD	Han–Xiongnu War	Han empire	Xiongnu
123 BC	121 BC	Roman conquest of the Balearic Islands	Roman Republic	Balearic pirates
122 BC	105 BC	Jugurthine War	Roman Republic	Numidia
113 BC	101 BC	Cimbrian War	Roman Republic	Cimbri, Teutons
111 BC	111 BC	Han–Nanyue War; Part of the Han wars against the Baiyue	Han dynasty	Nanyue
109 BC	109 BC	Han campaigns against Dian; Part of the Han wars against the Baiyue	Han dynasty	Dian Kingdom
109 BC	108 BC	Gojoseon–Han War	Han dynasty	Wiman Joseon
107 BC	88 BC	Civil War of Ptolemy Lathyros	Egypt (Ptolemy IX Soter); Cyprus; Phoenicia	Egypt (Cleopatra III); Judea (103–93); Nabatea (103–93)
104 BC	101 BC	War of the Heavenly Horses	Han dynasty	Dayuan
104 BC	100 BC	Second Servile War; Part of the Roman Servile Wars	Roman Republic	Slaves of Sicily
93 BC	93 BC	Battle of Gadara	Nabataean Kingdom	Hasmonean dynasty
93 BC	87 BC	Judean Civil War	Sadducees	Pharisees
91 BC	88 BC	Social War	Roman Republic	Cities of Italy under Marsi and Samnium
89 BC	63 BC	Mithridatic Wars	Roman Republic	Kingdom of Pontus
89 BC	85 BC	First Mithridatic War; Part of the Mithridatic Wars	Roman Republic; Kingdom of Bithynia	Kingdom of Pontus; Greek rebels
87 BC	87 BC	Bellum Octavianum		
87 BC	85 BC	Armenian–Parthian War	Kingdom of Armenia	Parthian Empire
84 BC	84 BC	Battle of Cana	Nabataean Kingdom	Seleucid Empire
83 BC	82 BC	Second Mithridatic War; Part of the Mithridatic Wars	Roman Republic	Kingdom of Pontus
83 BC	81 BC	Sulla's civil war	Sullans	Marians
80 BC	72 BC	Sertorian War	Sullans led by Pompey	Sertorians
73 BC	71 BC	Third Servile War or Spartacist Rebellion; Part of the Roman Servile Wars	Roman Republic	Army of escaped slaves under Spartacus
74 BC	63 BC	Third Mithridatic War; Part of the Mithridatic Wars	Roman Republic; Bithynia	Kingdom of Pontus; Kingdom of Armenia
67 BC	63 BC	Hasmonean Civil War; Part of the Mithridatic Wars	Pharisees; Roman Republic; Nabatean Kingdom	Sadducees
66 BC	217 AD	Roman–Parthian Wars	Roman Republic	Parthian Empire
65 BC	65 BC	Pompey's campaign in Iberia and Albania	Roman Republic	Iberian Kingdom; Caucasian Albania
58 BC	50 BC	Gallic Wars	Roman Republic	Gallic tribes Belgic tribes British tribes Aquitanian tribes Germanic tribes Iberian tribes
55 BC	54 BC	Caesar's invasions of Britain	Roman Republic; Trinovantes	Britons
54 BC	628 AD	Roman–Persian wars	Roman Republic (54–27 BC); Roman Empire (27 BC–224 AD); Roman Empire (224–395 AD); Byzantine Empire (395–628 AD)	Parthian Empire (54–27 BC); Parthian Empire (27 BC–224 AD); Sasanian Empire (224–395 AD); Sasanian Empire (395–628 AD)
53 BC	51 BC	Parthian War of Marcus Licinius Crassus	Parthian Empire	Roman Republic
49 BC	45 BC	Caesar's Civil War	Julius Caesar and supporters Populares	Roman Senate; Optimates
48 BC	47 BC	Pontic War	Roman Republic; Galatia; Cappadocia	Kingdom of Pontus
44 BC	30 BC	Roman civil wars	Roman Republic under Second Triumvirate	Mark Antony; Liberatores; Sextus Pompeius; Fulvia; Lucius Antonius
44 BC	44 BC	Post-Caesarian civil war Part of the Roman civil wars	Roman Senate	Mark Antony's forces
44 BC	42 BC	Liberators' civil war Part of the Roman civil wars	Second Triumvirate	Liberatores
44 BC	36 BC	Bellum Siculum; Part of the Roman civil wars	Roman Republic	Sextus Pompeius and his troops
41 BC	40 BC	Perusine War	Roman Republic	Forces of Fulvia and Lucius Antonius
41 BC	40 BC	Fulvia's civil war Part of the Roman civil wars	Roman Republic	Forces of Fulvia and Lucius Antonius
32 BC	30 BC	Final War of the Roman Republic; Part of the Roman civil wars	Roman Republic (supporters of Octavian)	Ptolemaic Egypt and the supporters of Mark Antony
40 BC	33 BC	Antony's Parthian War	Roman Republic; Armenia; Galatia; Cappadocia; Pontus	Parthian Empire; Atropatene
29 BC	19 BC	Cantabrian Wars	Roman Empire	Cantabri; Astures
19 BC	19 BC	War with the Garamantes	Roman Empire	Garamantes

== 1 AD – 1000 AD ==
Start	Finish	Name of Conflict	Belligerents	
Start	Finish	Name of Conflict	Victorious party (if applicable)	Defeated party (if applicable)
6 AD	9 AD	Bellum Batonianum	Roman Empire; Odrysian Kingdom	Daesitiates; Breuci; Dalmatae; Andizetes; Pannonians; Pirustae; Liburnians; Japodes
6 AD	21 AD	Goguryeo-Dongbuyeo Wars	Goguryeo	Dongbuyeo
9 AD	9 AD	Battle of the Teutoburg Forest	Cherusci	Roman Empire
17 AD	18 AD	Maroboduus' War with Arminius	Arminius' troops	Marcomanni
c. 17 AD	23 AD	Lülin Rebellion	Lülin	Xin dynasty
17 AD	24 AD	Tacfarinas' Rebellion	Roman Empire	Musulamii; Numidia
c. 17 AD	26 AD	Red Eyebrows Rebellion	Red Eyebrows movement	Xin dynasty Gengshi Emperor
40 AD	43 AD	Trung sisters' rebellion	Han dynasty	Lac Viet
43 AD	96 AD	Roman conquest of Britain	Roman Empire	British tribes
47 AD	47 AD	Iceni revolt against Publius Ostorius Scapula	Roman Empire	Iceni
50 AD	53 AD	War between Armenia and Iberia	Kingdom of Iberia	Kingdom of Armenia
c. 58 AD	c. 58 AD	Hermunduri-Chatti War	Hermunduri	Chatti
58 AD	63 AD	Roman–Parthian War	Roman Empire	Kingdom of Armenia; Parthian Empire
60 or 61 AD	60 or 61 AD	Roman conquest of Anglesey	Roman Empire	Celtic Britons
60 or 61 AD	60 or 61 AD	Boudica's Uprising	Roman Empire	Iceni, Trinovantes, and other British tribes.
66 AD	73 AD	First Jewish–Roman War	Roman Empire	Judean rebels: Sadducees and volunteers from Adiabene
69 AD	69 AD	Year of the Four Emperors	Vespasian	Galba; Otho; Vitellius
69 AD	70 AD	Revolt of the Batavi	Roman Empire	Batavi; Cananefates; Frisii; Lingones; Treveri
73 AD	73 AD	Battle of Yiwulu	Han dynasty	Northern Xiongnu
89 AD	93 AD	Destruction of the Xiongnu state	Han dynasty Southern Xiongnu	Northern Xiongnu
101 AD	102 AD	First Dacian War		
105 AD	106 AD	Second Dacian War	Roman Empire	Dacian Kingdom
115 AD	117 AD	Trajan's Parthian campaign	Roman Empire	Parthian Empire
115 AD	117 AD	Kitos War; Part of Trajan's Parthian Campaign	Roman Empire	Jews of Cyprus, Cyrenaica, Aegyptus, Mesopotamia and Iudaea
119 AD?	119 AD	Brigantes revolt	Roman Empire	Brigantes
2nd century AD	180s AD	Civil War of Wa	Queen Himiko	Japanese chiefdoms
132 AD	136 AD	Bar Kokhba revolt	Roman Empire	Jews of Iudaea under Simon Bar Kokhba
161 AD	166 AD	Roman–Parthian War	Roman Empire	Parthian Empire
166 AD	180 AD	Marcomannic Wars	Roman Empire	Marcomanni; Quadi; Iazyges
172 AD	175 AD	Bucolic War	Roman Empire; Marcus Aurelius; Avidius Cassius	Isidorus; Egyptian rebels
184 AD	205 AD	Yellow Turban Rebellion	Han dynasty	Yellow Turban rebels
190 AD	191 AD	Campaign against Dong Zhuo	Guangdong Coalition led by Yuan Shao And Cao Cao	Dong Zhuo
193 AD	193 AD	Year of the Five Emperors	Severan dynasty	Pertinax; Didius Julianus; Pescennius Niger; Clodius Albinus
194 AD	199 AD	Sun Ce's conquests in Jiangdong	Sun Ce	Shanyue; Various warlords
196 AD	197 AD	Clodius Albinus' Failed Usurpation	Roman Empire	Clodius Albinus' legions
202 AD	203 AD	Conquest of Garama	Roman Empire	Garamantes
208 AD	211 AD	Roman invasion of Caledonia	Roman Empire	Caledonians
216 AD	216 AD	Parthian war of Caracalla	Parthian Empire	Roman Empire
225 AD	225 AD	Zhuge Liang's Southern Campaign	Shu Han	Shu rebels Nanman
228 AD	234 AD	Zhuge Liang's Northern Expeditions	Cao Wei	Shu Han; Qiang people; Xianbei people
232 AD	c. 268 AD	Civil Wars during the Crisis of the Third Century	Illyriciani	Various Barracks emperors Various Usurpers, co-emperors, high officials and claimants to the throne Sassanid Empire
244 AD	245 AD	Goguryeo-Wei War	Cao Wei	Goguryeo; Okjeo; Ye
247 AD	262 AD	Jiang Wei's Northern Expeditions	Cao Wei	Shu Han; Di and Qiang tribes
249 AD	253 AD	Gothic War	Roman Empire	Goths; German-Sarmatian allies; Roman deserters
259 AD	260 AD	Invasion of Raetia by the Juthungi; Part of the Crisis of the Third Century	Roman Empire	Juthungi
263 AD	263 AD	Conquest of Shu by Wei	Cao Wei	Shu Han
268 or 269 AD	268 or 269 AD	Battle of Naissus; Part of the Crisis of the Third Century	Roman Empire	Goths
270 AD	271 AD	Establishment of the Palmyrene Empire; Part of the Crisis of the Third Century	Palmyrene Empire	Roman Empire; Tanukhids
270 AD	274 AD	Wars of Emperor Aurelian	Roman Empire	Vandals; Juthungi; Sarmatians; Alamanni; Rebellious mint workers Goths; Palmyrene Empire; Troops of Firmus; Province of Egypt; Sassanid Empire; Gallic Empire
270 AD	271 AD	Campaigns against Germanic tribes Part of the Wars of Emperor Aurelian	Roman Empire	Vandals; Juthungi; Sarmatians; Alamanni; Goths
271 AD	271 AD	Suppression of the Uprising led by Felicissimus; Part of the Wars of Emperor Aurelian	Roman Empire	Rebellious mint workers
272 AD	273 AD	Conquest of the Palmyrene Empire; Part of the Wars of Emperor Aurelian	Roman Empire	Palmyrene Empire; Troops of Firmus; Province of Egypt; Sassanid Empire
274 AD	274 AD	Conquest of the Gallic Empire; Part of the Wars of Emperor Aurelian	Roman Empire	Gallic Empire
279 AD	280 AD	Conquest of Wu by Jin	Jin dynasty	Eastern Wu
286 AD	296 AD	Carausian Revolt	Roman Empire	Carausius
291 AD	306 AD	War of the Eight Princes	Sima Yue	Various princes
306 AD	324 AD	Civil wars of the Tetrarchy	Constantine I's legions	Licinius's legions; Martinianus's legions; Maxentius's legions; Maximinus Daia's legions
306 AD	312 AD	War of Constantine and Maxentius; Part of the Civil wars of the Tetrarchy	Constantine I's legions	Maxentius's legions
313 AD	313 AD	War of Licinius and Maximinus Daia; Part of the Civil wars of the Tetrarchy	Licinius's legions	Maximinus Daia's legions
314 or 316 AD	324 AD	Wars of Constantine and Licinius; Part of the Civil wars of the Tetrarchy	Constantine I's legions	Licinius's legions Martinianus's legions
325 AD	325 AD	Shapur II's Arab campaign	Sasanian Empire	Banu Tamim and other Arab tribes
351 AD	352 AD	Jewish revolt against Constantius Gallus	Eastern Roman Empire	Jewish rebels
367 AD	367 AD	Great Conspiracy	Roman Empire	Picts; Scotti; Attacotti; Saxons; Franks; Roman deserters
376 AD	382 AD	Gothic War	Eastern Roman Empire	Ostrogoths; Franks
378 AD	378 AD	Tanukh revolt against Rome	Tanukhids	Eastern Roman Empire
378 AD	379 AD	Conquests of Siyaj K'ak'	Teotihuacan	Waka'; Tikal; Uaxactun; Bejucal; El Zotz
383 AD	383 AD	Battle of Fei River	Eastern Jin dynasty	Former Qin
391 AD	404 AD	Goguryeo–Wa War	Goguryeo; Silla	Baekje; Wa; Gaya
395 AD	410 AD	Conquests of Alaric I	Visigothic Kingdom	Western Roman Empire; Eastern Roman Empire
395 AD	397 AD	Visigothic Invasion of Greece; Part of the Conquests of Alaric I	Visigothic Kingdom	Eastern Roman Empire
c. 398 AD	c. 398 AD	Stilicho's Pictish War	Western Roman Empire	Picts; Saxons; Scots
398 AD	398 AD	Gildonic revolt	Western Roman Empire	Troops of Gildo
c. 401 AD	c. 403 AD	Visigothic First Invasion of Italy; Part of the Conquests of Alaric I	Western Roman Empire	Visigoths
406 AD	406 AD	Battle of Mainz	Vandals; Suevi; Alans	Franks
408 AD	410 AD	Visigothic Second Invasion of Italy; Part of the Conquests of Alaric I	Visigoths	Western Roman Empire
410 AD	410 AD	Sack of Rome; Part of the Conquests of Alaric I	Visigoths	Western Roman Empire
421 AD	422 AD	Roman–Sasanian War	Sassanid Empire; Lakhmids	Eastern Roman Empire
426 AD	426 AD	Conquest of Copán and Quiriguá	Teotihuacan	Copán; Quiriguá
432 AD	432 AD	Battle of Ravenna	Bonifacius	Flavius Aetius
434 AD	453 AD	Hunnic invasion of Europe	Hunnic Empire	Eastern Roman Empire; Western Roman Empire; Franks; Goths; Burgundians; Saxons; Alans; Minor Germanic and Gallic tribes
451 AD	451 AD	Battle of Avarayr	Sassanid Empire	Christian Armenian Rebels
before 453 AD	454 AD	Germanic-Hunnic Wars	Gepids; Ostrogoths; Heruli; Rugii; Sciri; Suebi	Huns; Alans
455 AD	455 AD	Sack of Rome	Vandals	Western Roman Empire
463 AD	463 AD	Kibi Clan Rebellion	Yamato Kingship; Emperor Yūryaku	Kibi clan; Silla
468 AD	468 AD	Battle of Cap Bon	Vandals	Western Roman Empire; Eastern Roman Empire
479 AD	479 AD	Prince Hoshikawa Rebellion	Yamato kingship; Prince Shiraka; Ōtomo clan	Prince Hoshikawa; Kibi clan
481 or 482 AD		Italian conquest of Roman Dalmatia	Kingdom of Italy	Roman Dalmatia
484 AD	484 AD	Battle of Herat	Hephthalite Empire	Sassanid Empire
484 AD	484 AD	Sukhra's Hephthalite campaign	Sassanid Empire	Hephthalite Empire
486 AD	486 AD	Battle of Soissons	Salian Franks of Tournai and Cambrai	Kingdom of Soissons
488 AD	493 AD	Conquest of Italy by Theoderic the Great	Ostrogoths; Rugians	Kingdom of Italy; Sciri; Heruli
492 AD	508 AD	Franco-Visigothic Wars	Franks	Visigoths
494 AD	534 AD	Basus War	Taghlib	Banu Bakr
502 AD	506 AD	Anastasian War	Sasanian Empire; Lakhmids	Byzantine Empire
511 AD	515 AD	Revolt of Vitalian	Byzantine Empire	Vitalian loyalists Chalcedonian Christian rebels
526 AD	532 AD	Iberian War	Sasanian Empire; Lakhmids; Sabirs	Byzantine Empire; Iberia; Ghassanids; Huns; Heruli; Aksumites; Kinda
527 AD	527 AD	Iwai Rebellion	Yamato court	Iwai clan in Tsukushi Province
c. 531 AD	c. 531 AD	Battle of Unstrut	Franks	Kingdom of Thuringia
533 AD	534 AD	Vandalic War	Byzantine Empire	Vandalic Kingdom
534 AD	537 AD	Wars against the Moors	Byzantine Empire	Moors
535 AD	554 AD	Gothic War	Byzantine Empire	Ostrogothic Kingdom; Frankish Kingdom
537 AD	572 AD	First Tikal-Calakmul War	Calakmul	Tikal
541 AD	562 AD	Lazic War	Sasanian Persian Empire; Lazica (541–548); Abasgia; Sabirs; Dailamites	Eastern Roman Empire; Lazica (after 548); Tzani; Alans; Sabirs; Armenians
after 550 AD	before 590 AD	Bhavavarman I's invasion of Funan	Chenla	Funan
551 AD	555 AD	Conquest of Spania	Byzantine Empire; Visigoths under Athanagild	Visigothic Kingdom
c. 555 AD	624 AD	Decline and Visigothic conquest of Spania	Visigothic Kingdom	Byzantine Empire
556 AD	556 AD	First Tikal-Caracol War; Part of the Tikal-Caracol Wars	Tikal	Caracol
557 AD	557 AD	Battle of Bukhara	Sassanid Empire; Western Turkic Khaganate	Hephthalite Empire
562 AD	562 AD	First "Star War" (Second Tikal-Caracol War); Part of the Tikal-Caracol Wars; Part of the "Star Wars"	Caracol; Calakmul	Tikal
567 AD	567 AD	Lombard–Gepid War	Lombards; Pannonian Avars	Gepids; Byzantine Empire
568 AD	608 AD	Dahis and al-Ghabra	Banu Abs	Banu Dhubyan
570 AD	578 AD	Aksumite–Persian wars	Sassanid Empire	Kingdom of Aksum
572 AD	591 AD	Byzantine–Sasanian War	Byzantine Empire; Ghassanids; Armenians	Sassanid Persian Empire; Lakhmids; Armenians
580 AD	584 AD	Hermenegild's revolt	Visigothic Kingdom	Hermenegild's loyalists Chalcedonian Christian rebels
581 AD	603 AD	Göktürk civil war	Western Gokturks	Eastern Gokturks
582 AD	602 AD	Maurice's Balkan campaigns	Byzantine Empire	Avar Khaganate; Antae
584 AD	589 AD	Fijar Wars	Quraysh	Hawazin
588 AD	588 AD	First Perso-Turkic War	Sassanid Persians	Hephthalite principalities Western Turkic Khaganate
598 AD	614 AD	Goguryeo–Sui Wars	Goguryeo	Sui dynasty
600 AD	793 AD	Frisian–Frankish wars	Frankish Empire	Frisian Kingdom
602 AD	602 AD	Sui–Former Lý War	Sui dynasty	Early Lý dynasty
602 AD	628 AD	Byzantine–Sasanian War	Byzantine Empire; Western Turkic Khaganate; Ghassanids	Sasanian Empire; Avars (and Slavic allies); Sasanian Iberia; Jewish and Samaritan rebels (c. 614); Lakhmids
605 AD	605 AD	Sino–Cham war	Sui dynasty	Lâm Ấp
613 AD	628 AD	Transition from Sui to Tang	Tang dynasty	Zhèng; Xǔ; Xia; Dingyang; Liang; Wu; Chu
614 AD	628 AD	Jewish revolt against Heraclius	Byzantine Empire	Sasanian Empire; Jewish rebels
619 AD	619 AD	Second Perso-Turkic War	Sasanian Empire	Western Turkic Khaganate; Hephthalites
622 AD	750 AD	Early Muslim conquests	First Islamic state Rashidun Caliphate; Umayyad Caliphate	Sasanian Empire; Byzantine Empire; Western Turkic Khaganate; Tang dynasty Chach dynasty Visigothic Kingdom; Kingdom of Asturias; Frankish Kingdom
624 AD	629 AD	Muslim–Quraysh War	Muslims	Quraysh tribe
627 AD	629 AD	Third Perso-Turkic War	Western Turkic Khaganate; Byzantine Empire	Sasanian Empire; Iberia
627 AD	627 AD	First Caracol–Naranjo War; Part of the Caracol–Naranjo Wars	Caracol	Naranjo
628 AD	628 AD	Second Caracol–Naranjo War; Part of the Caracol–Naranjo Wars	Caracol	Naranjo
628 AD	632 AD	Sasanian civil war	Parsig faction Nimruzi faction	Pahlav faction Shahrbaraz's faction
629 AD	1050s AD	Arab–Byzantine wars	Byzantine Empire; First Bulgarian Empire; Mardaites; Kingdom of Italy; Italian city-states	First Islamic state Rashidun Caliphate; Umayyad Caliphate; Abbasid Caliphate; Aghlabid Emirate; Emirate of Bari; Emirate of Crete; Zirid Emirate; Emirate of Sicily; Fatimid Caliphate; Hamdanid Emirate; Mirdasid Emirate
629 AD	630 AD	Tang campaign against the Eastern Turks	Tang dynasty	Eastern Turkic Khaganate
630 AD	630 AD	Battle of Hunayn	Muslims; Quraysh tribe	Hawazin; Thaqif
631 AD	631 AD	Battle of Wogastisburg	Samo's Empire	Francia
631 AD	631 AD	Second "Star War" (Third Caracol–Naranjo War); Part of the Caracol–Naranjo Wars and the "Star Wars"	Caracol	Naranjo
632 AD	633 AD	Ridda wars	Rashidun Caliphate	Musaylima
633 AD	644 AD	Muslim conquest of Persia; Part of the Muslim conquests	Rashidun Caliphate	Sassanid Empire; Arab Christians
634 AD	638 AD	Muslim conquest of the Levant; Part of the Byzantine–Arab Wars	Rashidun Caliphate	Byzantine Empire; Ghassanids
636 AD	636 AD	Third "Star War" (Fourth Caracol–Naranjo War); Part of the Caracol–Naranjo Wars and the "Star Wars"	Caracol	Naranjo
634 AD	635 AD	Emperor Taizong's campaign against Tuyuhun	Tang dynasty	Tuyuhun
638 AD	638 AD	Tibetan attack on Songzhou	Tang dynasty	Tibetan Empire
639 AD	661 AD	Arab invasion of Armenia	Rashidun Caliphate	Byzantine Empire; Byzantine Armenia; Sasanian Empire; Sasanian Armenia; Khazaria
639 AD	642 AD	Muslim conquest of Egypt	Rashidun Caliphate	Byzantine Empire
640 AD	657 AD	Tang campaigns against the Western Turks	Tang dynasty	Western Turkic Khaganate
640 AD	648 AD	Tang campaign against the oasis states Part of the Tang wars against the Western Turks	Tang dynasty	States of the Tarim Basin
640 AD	640 AD	Tang campaign against Karakhoja; Part of the Tang wars against the Western Turks	Tang dynasty	Gaochang
643 AD	645 AD	Muslim conquest of Azerbaijan	Rashidun Caliphate	Sasanian Empire
644 AD	644 AD	Fourth "Star War"; Part of the "Star Wars"	Tortuguero	Unknown
644 AD	644 AD	Battle of Rasil	Rashidun Caliphate	Rai dynasty
644 AD	648 AD	Tang campaigns against Karasahr; Part of the Tang wars against the Western Turks	Tang dynasty	Karasahr
644 AD	668 AD	Goguryeo–Tang War	Tang dynasty Silla	Goguryeo; Baekje; Mohe
645 AD	646 AD	Emperor Taizong's campaign against Xueyantuo	Tang dynasty	Xueyantuo
647 AD	709 AD	Muslim conquest of the Maghreb; Part of the Byzantine–Arab Wars	Rashidun Caliphate; Umayyad Caliphate	Byzantine Empire; Berbers
648 AD	648 AD	Tang campaign against Kucha; Part of the Tang wars against the Western Turks	Tang dynasty	Kucha
650 AD	695 AD	Second Tikal-Calakmul War	Tikal	Calakmul
651 AD	751 AD	Muslim conquest of Transoxiana	Umayyad Caliphate (until 748); Abbasid Caliphate (from 748)	Principalities of Tokharistan; Sogdian principalities Khwarazm; Fergana; Türgesh Kaghanate; Tang dynasty
656 AD	661 AD	First Fitna	Aisha's forces Muawiya's forces Kharijites	Rashidun Caliphate
657 AD	657 AD	Conquest of the Western Turks; Part of the Tang wars against the Western Turks	Tang dynasty	Western Turkic Khaganate
657 AD	672 AD	Fifth and Seventh "Star War" (Tikal-Dos Pilas War); Part of the "Star Wars"	Tikal	Dos Pilas
658 AD	660 AD	North expedition of Abe no Hirafu; Also called Mishihase War	Yamato	Mishihase
660 AD	663 AD	Baekje–Tang War	Tang; Silla	Baekje; Yamato; Goguryeo
670 AD	676 AD	Silla–Tang Wars	Silla; Former Goguryeo armies Former Baekje armies	Tang
672 AD	672 AD	Jinshin War	Prince Ōama's loyal warriors	Prince Ōtomo's loyal warriors
672 AD	672 AD	Sixth "Star War"; Part of the "Star Wars"	Palenque	Unknown
672 AD	672 AD	Nuun Ujol Chaak's Conquest of Dos Pilas	Tikal	Dos Pilas
677 AD	677 AD	Eighth "Star War"; Part of the "Star Wars"	La Corona	Tikal
677 AD	679 AD	War against Nuun Ujol Chaak	Calakmul; Dos Pilas	Tikal
680 AD	680 AD	Ninth "Star War" (Fifth Caracol–Naranjo War); Part of the Caracol–Naranjo Wars and the "Star Wars"	Naranjo	Caracol
680 AD	1355 AD	Byzantine–Bulgarian Wars	Bulgarian Empires	Byzantine Empire
680 AD	692 AD	Second Fitna	Umayyad Caliphate	Zubayrids; Alids
687 AD	711 AD	Palenque-Toniná Wars	Toniná	Palenque
695 AD	695 AD	Jasaw Chan K'awiil I's Campaign on Calakmul	Tikal	Calakmul
702 AD	702 AD	Battle of Varnakert	Kingdom of Armenia	Umayyad Caliphate
705 AD	705 AD	Tenth "Star War"; Part of the "Star Wars"	Dos Pilas	Caracol
711 AD	711 AD	Eleventh "Star War"; Part of the "Star Wars"	Tonina	Palenque
711 AD	718 AD	Umayyad conquest of Hispania	Umayyad Caliphate	Visigothic Kingdom
715 AD	718 AD	Frankish Civil War	Charles Martel	Neustrian nobility
717 AD	718 AD	Siege of Constantinople; Part of the Byzantine–Arab Wars	Byzantine Empire; Bulgar Khanate	Umayyad Caliphate
719 AD	759 AD	Islamic invasion of Gaul	Merovingian Franks	Umayyad Caliphate
720 AD	721 AD	Hayato Rebellion	Yamato	Hayato
720 AD	744 AD	Third Tikal-Calakmul War	Tikal	Calakmul
720 AD	832 AD	Bashmurian revolts	Umayyad Caliphate; Abbasid Caliphate	Coptic rebels
735 AD	735 AD	Twelfth "Star War"; Part of the "Star Wars"	Dos Pilas	Seibal
735 AD	737 AD	Marwan ibn Muhammad's invasion of Georgia	Byzantine Empire; Bulgar Khanate	Umayyad Caliphate
736 AD	736 AD	Yik'in Chan K'awiil's Conquest of Calakmul; Part of Yik'in Chan K'awiil's conquests	Tikal	Calakmul
738 AD	738 AD	K'ak' Tiliw Chan Yopaat's War against Copán	Quiriguá	Copán
739 AD	743 AD	Berber Revolt	Berber rebels	Umayyad Caliphate
740 AD	740 AD	Zaydi Revolt	Umayyad Caliphate	Zayd ibn Ali
740 AD	740 AD	Fujiwara no Hirotsugu Rebellion	Imperial Court	Fujiwara no Hirotsugu
743 AD	743 AD	Yik'in Chan K'awiil's Conquest of Waka'; Part of Yik'in Chan K'awiil's conquests	Tikal	Waka'
744 AD	744 AD	Yik'in Chan K'awiil's Conquest of Naranjo; Part of Yik'in Chan K'awiil's conquests	Tikal	Naranjo
746 AD	750 AD	Abbasid Revolution	Abbasid Caliphate	Umayyad Caliphate
750 AD	754 AD	Tianbao War	Nanzhao	Tang dynasty
751 AD	751 AD	Battle of Talas	Abbasid Caliphate	Tang dynasty Karluk mercenaries
755 AD	763 AD	An Lushan Rebellion	Tang Empire	Yan
762 AD	763 AD	Alid Revolt	Abbasid Caliphate	Alids
764 AD	764 AD	Fujiwara no Nakamaro Rebellion	Empress Kōken	Fujiwara no Nakamaro
770 AD	811 AD	Thirty-Eight Years' War	Imperial Court	Emishi
772 AD	804 AD	Saxon Wars	Frankish Empire	Saxons
775 AD	775 AD	Battle of Bagrevand	Abbasid Caliphate	Armenian Princes
778 AD	778 AD	Tan Te' K'inich's War	Aguateca	Unknown
781 AD	781 AD	Thirteenth "Star War"; Part of the "Star Wars"	Piedras Negras	Unknown
781 or 782 AD	781 or 782 AD	Rebellion of Elpidius	Byzantine Empire	Elpidius' loyalists Sicily
786 AD	786 AD	Battle of Fakhkh	Abbasid Caliphate	Alids
788 AD	803 AD	Avar Wars	Frankish Empire	Avar Khaganate
793 AD	796 AD	Qaysi–Yamani war	Yamani Tribal Federation; Abbasid Caliphate	Mudhari (Qaysi) Tribal Federation
793 AD	850 AD	Viking Raids on the British Isles	Vikings	Anglo-Saxons
794 AD	794 AD	Battle of Shenchuan	Nanzhao	Tibet
795 AD	902 AD	Viking Invasion of Ireland	Vikings	Irish Kingdoms
c. 795 AD	940 AD	Viking Invasion of Francia	Vikings	Frankish Kingdom
807 AD	814 AD	Khan Krum's Wars	Bulgarian Empire	Byzantine Empire
827 AD	902 AD	Muslim conquest of Sicily	Aghlabid Emirate; Abbasid Caliphate	Byzantine Empire
c. 830 AD	c. 830 AD	Paphlagonian expedition of the Rus'	Rus' Khaganate	Paphlagonia
835 AD	835 AD	Sweet Dew Incident	Eunuchs	Emperor Wenzong of Tang
839 AD	after 844 AD	Viking Raids in Spain	Kingdom of Asturias; Emirate of Córdoba	Vikings
842 AD	1247 AD	Era of Fragmentation	Yumtän	Ösung
844 AD	844 AD	Viking Raid in Portugal	Vikings	Emirate of Córdoba
854 AD	855 AD	Homs revolts	Abbasid Caliphate	Homs rebels
854 AD	866 AD	Tang–Nanzhao war	Tang Empire	Nanzhao
860 AD	860 AD	Rus'–Byzantine War	Rus' Khaganate	Byzantine Empire
862 AD	973 AD	Hungarian invasions of Europe	Magyar tribes	Kingdom of Italy; East Francia; Middle Francia; Great Moravia; Byzantine Empire; Catalan Counties; Al-Andalus; First Bulgarian Empire; Khazaria; West Francia; Principality of Lower Pannonia; Principality of Littoral Croatia; Kingdom of Croatia; Principality of Serbia
865 AD	954 AD	Viking Invasion and Occupation of the British Isles	Vikings	Anglo-Saxons
866 AD	896 AD	Kharijite Rebellion	Abbasid Caliphate	Kharijite rebels
869 AD	883 AD	Zanj Rebellion	Abbasid Caliphate	Zanj
872 or 878 AD	872 or 878 AD	Battle of Bathys Ryax	Byzantine Empire	Paulicians
Between 872 and 900 AD	Between 872 and 900 AD	Battle of Hafrsfjord	Kingdom of Vestfold	Kingdom of Hordaland; Kingdom of Agder
882 AD	884 AD	Wilhelminer War; Part of the Frankish-Moravian Wars	Great Moravia; Aribonids	East Francia; Wilhelminer Dynasty
888 AD	888 AD	Samanid Civil War of 888	Party of Ismail I	Party of Nasr I
894 AD	896 AD	Byzantine–Bulgarian war	Bulgarian Empire; Pechenegs	Byzantine Empire; Magyars
907 AD	907 AD	Rus'–Byzantine War	Kievan Rus'	Byzantine Empire
913 AD	927 AD	Byzantine–Bulgarian war	Bulgarian Empire	Byzantine Empire; Principality of Serbia
913 AD	913 AD	Caspian expedition of the Rus'	Tabaristan; Khazars; Caucasian Albania; Shirvan; Volga Bulgaria; Burtas	Rus' Khaganate
914 AD	915 AD	Fatimid invasion of Egypt	Abbasid Caliphate	Fatimid Caliphate
914 AD	980 AD	Second Viking Invasion of Ireland	Irish Kingdoms	Vikings; Kingdom of Dublin
924 AD	924 AD	Battle of Sevan	Kingdom of Armenia	Sajids
926 AD	926 AD	Croatian–Bulgarian battle	Kingdom of Croatia	Bulgarian Empire
929 AD	929 AD	Battle of Lenzen	East Francia	Veleti
938 AD	938 AD	Battle of Bạch Đằng	Tĩnh Hải quân rebels	Southern Han
939 AD	941 AD	Tengyō no Ran	Imperial Court; Taira no Sadamori; Minamoto no Tsunemoto	Taira no Masakado; Fujiwara no Sumitomo
941 AD	941 AD	Rus'–Byzantine War	Byzantine Empire	Kievan Rus'
943 AD	943 AD	Caspian expedition of the Rus'	Caucasian Albania	Rus' Khaganate
955 AD	955 AD	Battle of Lechfeld; Part of the Hungarian invasions of Europe	Kingdom of Germany; Bohemia	Magyars
963 AD	967 AD	Polish–Veletian War	Duchy of Poland; Duchy of Bohemia (967)	Confederacy of the Veleti; Wolinians (967)
965 AD	968 or 969 AD	Destruction of Khazaria	Rus' Khaganate	Khazars
966 AD	966 AD	Second Viking Raid in Portugal	Emirate of Córdoba	Vikings
967 or 968 AD	971 AD	Sviatoslav's invasion of Bulgaria	Byzantine Empire	Kievan Rus'; Pechenegs; Magyars; Bulgaria
968 AD	1018 AD	Byzantine conquest of Bulgaria	Byzantine Empire; Kievan Rus' (968–969); Kingdom of Hungary; Principality of Duklja; Kingdom of Croatia	Bulgarian Empire; Kievan Rus' (970–971); Pechenegs
974 AD	975 AD	Syrian campaigns of John Tzimiskes	Byzantine Empire	Fatimid Caliphate; Buyid dynasty Hamdanid dynasty Emirate of Damascus
977 AD	978 AD	War of the Three Henries	Holy Roman Empire	Henry II
980 AD	1012 AD	Second Viking Invasion of the British Isles	Vikings	Anglo-Saxons
981 AD	981 AD	Song–Vietnamese war	Đại Việt	Song dynasty
982 AD	982 AD	Cham–Vietnamese War	Đại Việt	Champa
985 AD	986 AD	Battle of Fýrisvellir	Sweden	Denmark Jomsvikings
987 AD	989 AD	Rebellion of Bardas Phokas the Younger	Byzantine Empire; Kievan Rus'	Phokas clan Principality of Tao-Klarjeti; Buyid dynasty Faction of Bardas Skleros
993 AD	993 AD	First conflict in the Goryeo–Khitan War	Liao dynasty	Goryeo
996 AD	996 AD	Peasants' revolt of 996	Duchy of Normandy	Peasants
996 AD	996 AD	Koppány's Revolt	Kingdom of Hungary	Somogy
999 AD	999 AD	Battle of Svolder	Denmark; Sweden; Earls of Lade	Norway
999 AD	1000 AD	Leinster revolt against Brian Ború	Kingdom of Meath; Kingdom of Munster	Kingdom of Leinster; Kingdom of Dublin
