= Qa'a =

Pharaoh of Egypt from ca. 2910 BC

- Biénechês, Óubiênthis, Víbenthis
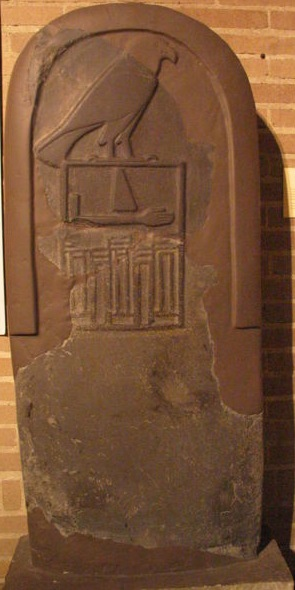
- Restored tomb stele of Qa'a at the Penn Museum, Philadelphia

Pharaoh
- Reign: c. 33 years, ca. 2910 BC
- Predecessor: Semerkhet
- Successor: Hotepsekhemwy (most likely) or Sneferka, Horus Bird
Royal titulary
Horus name
Hor-Qa'a
Ḥr-qˁ3
He with the raised arm of Horus
G5	N29 D36
Nebty name
Nebty-Sen
nb.ty-sn
The one whom the Two Ladies have kissed
G16	T22 D20 N35
Prenomen
Nisut-Bity-Qa'a
nsw.t-bty-qˁ3
King of Lower and Upper Egypt, he of the two ladies, he with the raised arm
M23 t L2 t G16 N29 D36
Abydos King List
Qebeh
qbḥ
He from the north
< N29 D58 V28 >
Saqqara Tablet
Qebehu-khenti
qbḥ.w-ḫntj
He from the cool north
< N29 D58 V28 G43 W15 >
Turin King List
...beh
...bḥ
< HASH HASH D58 V28 > G7
- Father: Semerkhet (most likely) or Anedjib
- Burial: Tomb Q, Umm el-Qa'ab
- Dynasty: 1st Dynasty

Qa'a (also Qáa or Ka'a) (literal meaning: "his arm is raised") was the last king of the First Dynasty of Egypt. He reigned for about 33 years at the end of the 30th century BC.

== Identity ==
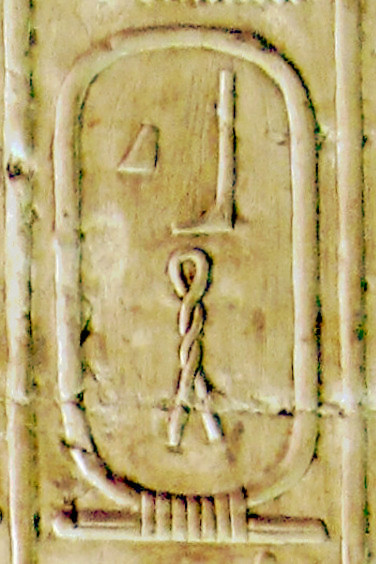
Qebeh, cartouche name of Qa'a in the Abydos king list.

Manetho calls Qa'a Biénechês and gives him a reign of 26 years according to the version preserved by Sextus Julius Africanus. Other versions of copies of Manetho's epitomes give other hellenized names such as Óubiênthis for versions by Eusebius and Víbenthis by Armenian versions of Eusebius.

== Family ==
The parents of Qa'a are unknown, but it is thought that either his predecessor Anedjib or Semerkhet was his father, since it was tradition to leave the throne to the eldest son. If Manetho suggested correctly (remembering the tradition), Semerkhet was Qa'a's father.

== Reign ==
There is not much known about Qa'a's reign, but it seems that he reigned for a long time (around 33 years). Several stone vessel inscriptions mention a second Sed festival for Qa'a, which points to at least 33 years of reign. The first festival was usually not celebrated before 30 years of reign, and subsequent festivals could be repeated every third year. However, the festival was not seemingly celebrated like this in the first dynasty, as Den celebrated his second Sed festival in his 26th year, and Anedjib's ten year reign had two as well. Various reconstructions of the Palermo Stone give Qa'a between 17 and 36 years on the throne. The Palermo Stone only mentions the year of coronation and some usual cultic events that were celebrated under every king. The numerous ivory tags dating to his reign also mention only typical arrangements, such as depicting and counting burial offerings and personal possessions of the king. Several mastaba tombs of high officials date into Qa'a's reign: Merka (S3505), Henuka (burial unknown), Neferef (burial also unknown) and Sabef (buried in the royal necropolis of Qa'a).

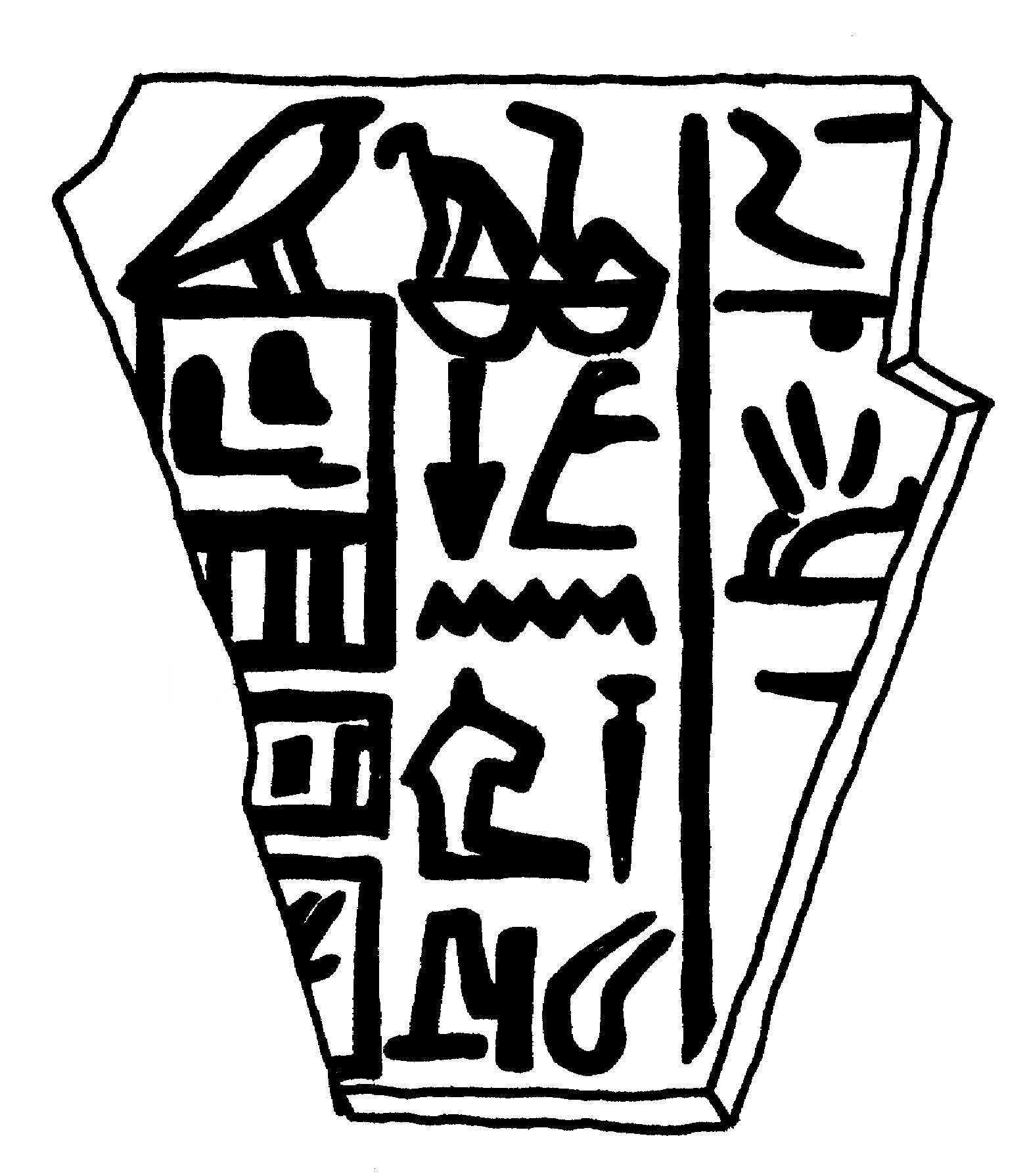
Ivory label of Qa'a with his serekh and Nebty name sn.

== End of reign ==
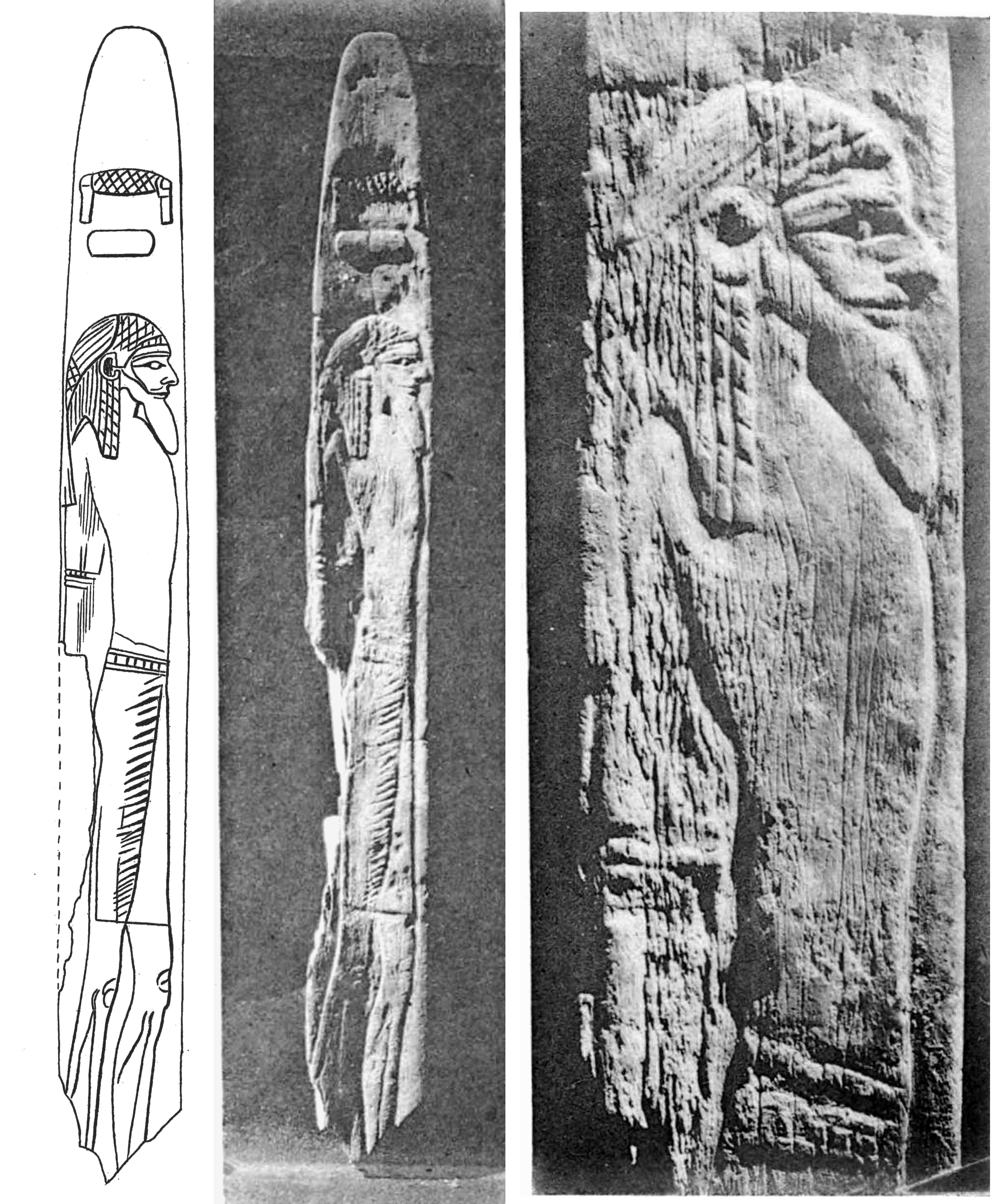
Abydos ivory tablet from the tomb of King Qa'a. Asiatic prisoner.

Despite Qa'a's long and prosperous reign, evidence shows that after his death, a dynastic war between different royal houses began over the newly empty throne. In the tomb of the high official Merka, a stone vessel with the name of a king Sneferka was found. It is unclear whether "Sneferka" was an alternate name of Qa'a or if he was a separate, ephemeral ruler. Egyptologists such as Wolfgang Helck and Toby Wilkinson point to a further mysterious ruler named "Horus Bird", whose name was found on vessel fragments dating to the end of the first dynasty. It is postulated that Sneferka and Horus Bird fought for power and that Hotepsekhemwy ended the fight and finally ascended the throne of Egypt, thus starting the Second Dynasty. Strong clues to that theory are traces of grave robberies and arsons found in the royal tombs of Abydos. Clay seals of Hotepsekhemwy found in Qa'a's tomb suggest that he restored the tomb or buried Qa'a, maybe in an attempt to legitimize his rule.

== Death ==
=== Burial ===
Map of Qa'a's tomb. Note the subsidiary burial around the main chamber.

In Abydos, the Tomb of Qa'a (Tomb Q) was a fairly large tomb, which measures 98.5 X 75.5 feet or 30 X 23 meters. A long reign is supported by the large size of this ruler's burial site at Abydos. This tomb was excavated by German archaeologists in 1993 and proved to contain 26 satellite (i.e. sacrificial) burials. The beautiful tomb stela of Qa'a is now on display at the University of Pennsylvania Museum of Archaeology and Anthropology.

A number of year labels have also been discovered dating to his reign at the First Dynasty burial site of Umm el-Qa'ab in Abydos. Qa'a is believed to have ruled Egypt around 2916 BCE. A necropolis sealing was found that lists all eight of the kings of what scholars now call the First Dynasty in the correct order, starting with Narmer.

=== High Officials ===
The tomb of one of Qa'a's state officials at Saqqara—a certain nobleman named Merka—contained a stele with many titles. There is a second Sed festival attested. This fact plus the high quality of a number of royal steles depicting the king implies that Qa'a's reign was a fairly stable and prosperous period of time.

=== Succession ===
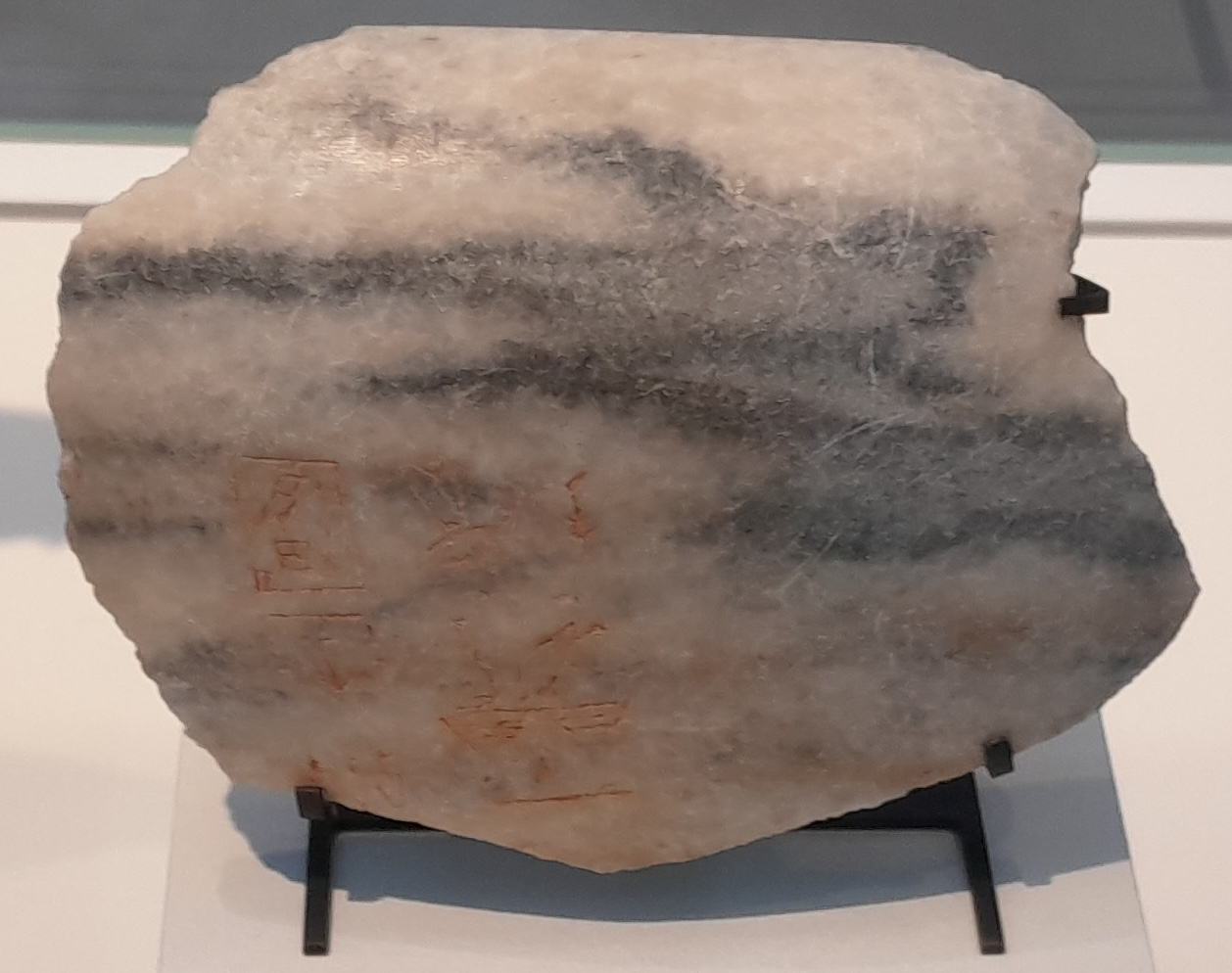
Stone vase inscribed with pharaoh Qa'a's name, from his tomb, Louvre-Lens museum

A seal impression bearing Hotepsekhemwy's name was found near the entrance of the tomb of Qa'a (Tomb Q) by the German Archaeological Institute in the mid-1990s. The discovery of the seal impression has been interpreted as evidence that Qa'a was buried, and therefore succeeded, by Hotepsekhemwy, the founder of the second dynasty of Egypt, as Manetho states.

A dish inscribed with the name and titles of Qa'a was discovered in the tomb of second dynasty pharaoh Seth-Peribsen (Tomb P of Petrie).

== See also ==
- List of pharaohs

Preceded by Semerkhet	Pharaoh of Egypt	Succeeded by Sneferka
