= Sabef =

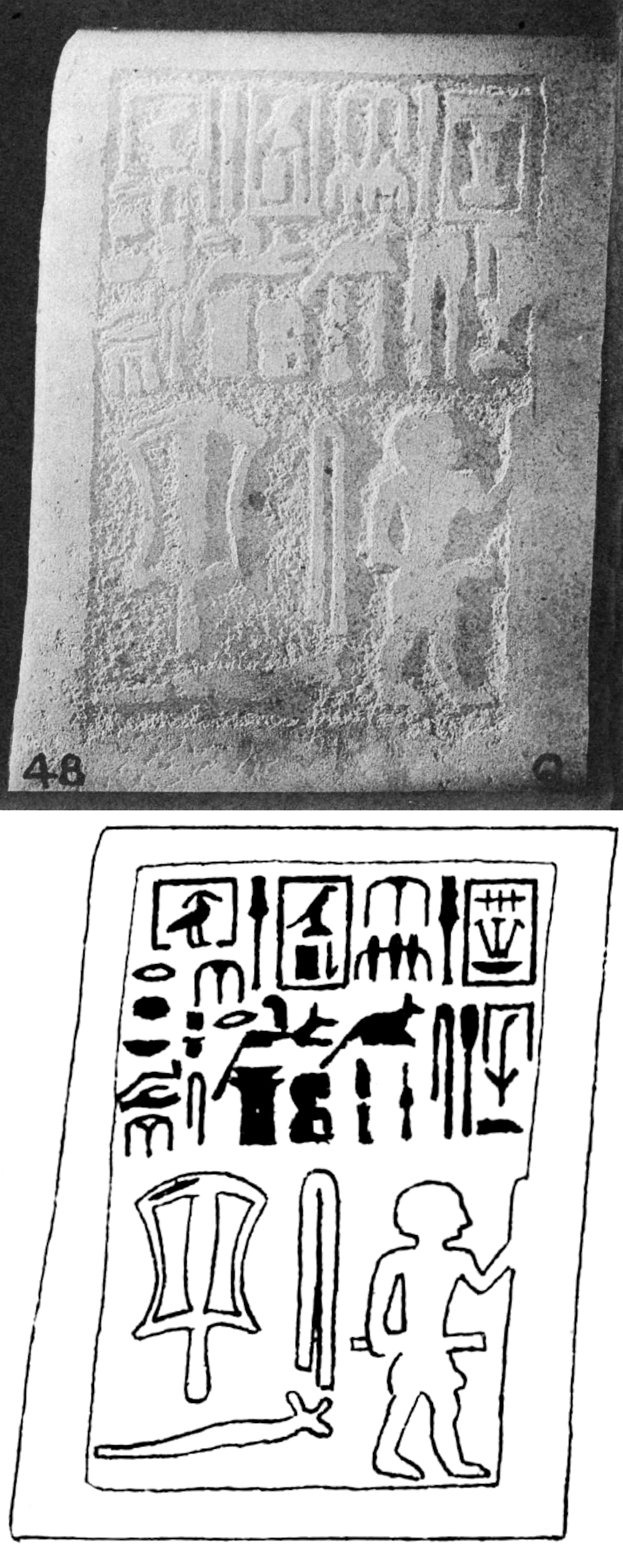
Sabef stela in incipient hieroglyphs. Reign of Qa'a, 1st Dynasty, ca. 2910 BC

s F28 f
Sabef
in hieroglyphs
Era: Early Dynastic Period
(3150–2686 BC)

Sabef (s3b.f) was an ancient Egyptian official under king Qa'a in the First Dynasty, around 2900 BC.

Sabef is known from a stela found next to the tomb of the king at Abydos.

The stela, now in the Egyptian Museum of Cairo is made of limestone and is inscribed with a long list of titles. However, the reading and translation of his titles is highly problematic, given that the earliest hieroglyphic inscriptions are still difficult to translate. On his stela Sabef is standing and looking to the right with a scepter in one hand and a staff in his other hand. His titles include:

- Director of the dining-hall and of the wine-cellar of the estate all protection behind (him)
- Director of the domain: seat of the Horus with a harpoon and of the red house
- Friend of the king's domain
- The [one] responsible for every seat which is bespoken in the hall

== Bibliography ==
- Michael Rice, Who-is-who in ancient Egypt. Routledge, London 1999, ISBN 0-415-15448-0, page 173
