= Perneb =

- Son of the king, Priest of Sopdu
Egyptian name
O1 V30pr-nb
Lord of (his) house

Perneb is the name of an ancient Egyptian prince and priest, who lived at the beginning of the 2nd Dynasty.

== Identity ==
Perneb's name is preserved on several clay seals found in the gallery tomb A at Saqqara, which is attributed to two kings (pharaohs) at the same time (king Hotepsekhemwy and king Nebra). This circumstance lead to disputes about the family origin of Perneb; it cannot be said for sure whose son he exactly was.

Perneb became known for a very rare and unusual title: he was priest of Sopdu, a deity which was rarely named in early Egypt. His cult center was somewhere in the eastern Nile Delta at a city called Iptjw. The exact geographical position of this town is not known. It is also unknown where Perneb was interred.
