= Ba (pharaoh) =

Early ancient Egyptian king

Horus-Ba
- Ba, Hor-Ba
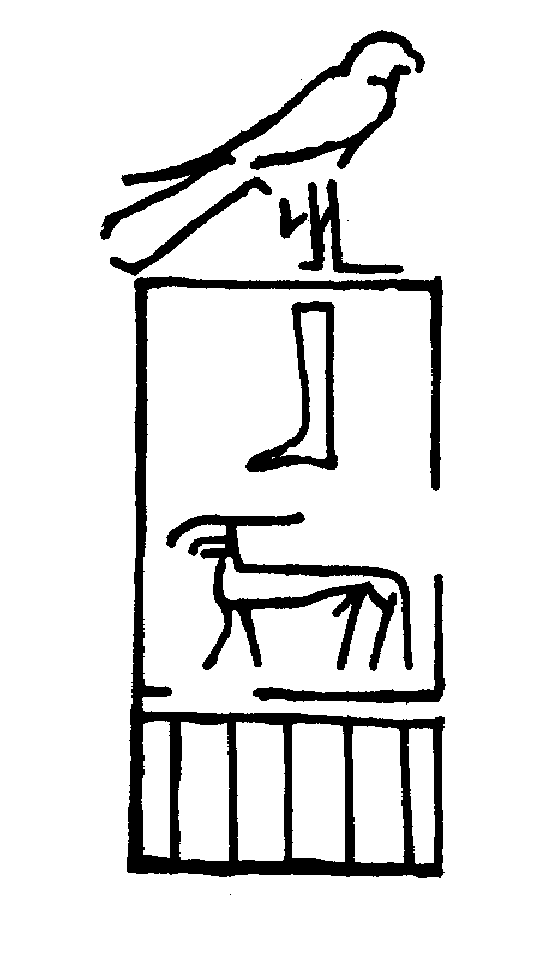
- Serekh of Horus-Ba

Pharaoh
- Predecessor: Nynetjer?
- Successor: Unknown
Royal titulary
Horus name
Hor-Ba
Hr-b3
Soul of Horus
G5	b E11
- Dynasty: Uncertain, possibly the First, Second or Third Dynasty

Ba, also known as Horus Ba, is the serekh-name of an early Egyptian or ancient Egyptian king who may have ruled at the end of the 1st Dynasty, the latter part of 2nd Dynasty or during the 3rd Dynasty. Neither the exact length of his reign nor his chronological position is known.

== Name sources ==
The only sure name sources for a king "Ba" are a fragment of green schist, found in the underground galleries beneath the Pyramid of Djoser at Sakkara, and the (6th Dynasty) mastaba tomb of the high official Ny-Ankh-Ba.

== Identity ==
Very little is known about king Ba. The few archaeological evidences only assure the existence of such a ruler, but they give no further information.

In 1899 the scientist Alessandro Ricci published a drawing of a serekh with a single leg (Gardiner-sign D58) as hieroglyph inside. The picture was seen in Volume No. 35 of the Zeitschrift für Ägyptische Sprache und Altertumskunde series. According to Ricci the serekh was found in a rock inscription at Wadi Maghareh, Sinai. The Egyptologists Jaroslav Černý and Michel Baude found out, that Ricci was referring to the rock inscription of the 3rd Dynasty king Sanakht. Ricci simply had misinterpreted the signs used for Sanakht's name – an upright sign of a rope loop, the zig-zag shaped sign for water and a branch-sign below – as a single leg-symbol.

Egyptologists such as Černý and Peter Kaplony think that king Ba might be identical to the likewise sparsely attested king Horus Bird. This ruler wrote his name with the sign of a goose-like bird, but since the depiction of the bird-sign in question lacks artistic details allowing any identification, Egyptologists are disputing the correct reading and meaning of Horus Bird's name. Černý and Kaplony think that both king's names have the same transcription: "Ba". In this case Horus Ba and Horus Bird would be the same historical figure. Černý and Kaplony's theory is not commonly accepted.

In contrast, Egyptologists such as Nabil Swelim think that Horus Ba was an immediate successor of the 2nd Dynasty king Nynetjer. He points to the name form of Nynetjer in the Abydos kinglist, which begins with the same hieroglyphic sign (a ram; Gardiner-sign E11) like the serekh name of Horus Ba. Swelim therefore believes that the Horus name of Ba was erroneously intermingled with the birth name of Nynetjer.

Ba's burial site is unknown.

== See also ==
- List of pharaohs
