= Star war =

Type of Maya conflict

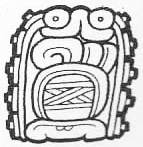
Glyph from Naranjo Hieroglyphic Stairway (AD 631)

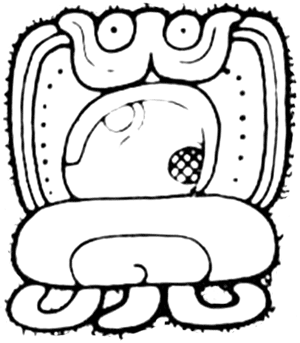
Glyph from Tortuguero Monument 6 (AD 669)

Examples of 'star war' glyphs

A star war was a decisive conflict between rival polities of the Maya civilization during the first millennium AD. The term comes from a specific type of glyph used in the Maya script, which depicts a star showering the earth with liquid droplets, or a star over a shell. It represents a verb but its phonemic value and specific meaning have not yet been deciphered. The name "star war" was coined by the epigrapher Linda Schele to refer to the glyph, and by extension to the type of conflict that it indicates.

== Examples ==
Maya inscriptions assign episodes of Maya warfare to four distinct categories, each represented by its own glyph. Those accorded the greatest significance by the Maya were described with the "star war" glyph, representing a major war resulting in the defeat of one polity by another. This represents the installation of a new dynastic line of rulers, complete dominion of one polity over another, or a successful war of independence by a formerly dominated polity.

Losing a star war could be disastrous for the defeated party. The first recorded star war in 562, between Caracol and Tikal, resulted in a 120-year hiatus for the latter city. It saw a decline in Tikal's population, a cessation of monument erection, and the destruction of certain monuments in the Great Plaza. When Calakmul defeated Naranjo in a star war on 25 December 631, it resulted in Naranjo's ruler being tortured to death and possibly eaten. Another star war in February 744 resulted in Tikal sacking Caracol and capturing a personal god effigy of its ruler. An inscription from a monument found at Tortuguero (dating from 669) describes the aftermath of a star war: "the blood was pooled, the skulls were piled".

== Astronomical connections ==
Mayanists have noted that the dates of recorded star wars often coincide with astronomical events involving the planet Venus, either when it was first visible in the morning or night sky or during its absence at inferior conjunction. Venus was known to Mesoamerican civilizations as the bringer of war (in contrast to the equivalent European belief assigning that characteristic to Mars). The Maya called it Chak Ek' or "Great Star" and made it the focus of detailed astronomical observation and calculation. The Dresden Codex, one of only four surviving Maya books, includes astronomical tables for calculating the position of Venus, which the codex depicts as spearing people as it passes overhead.

Seventy percent of recorded star war dates are reported to correspond with Venus's evening phase, while 84 percent (of the 70 percent) match the first appearance of the evening star. Star wars also appear to have had a seasonal bias, clustering in the dry season from November through January. Few were recorded to have happened during the planting season and none at all during harvest time, between mid-September and late October. There may also have been a correlation between star wars and solar eclipses; some star wars at Tikal seem to have taken place shortly after eclipses, in one case in July 743 only one day after a solar eclipse.

The precise nature of the proposed link between star wars and astronomical events is unclear. It is possible that events such as eclipses may have stimulated star wars, prompting the Maya to launch star wars in the belief that they had received a favorable omen for military endeavors. They may also have had astronomical connections with planets other than Venus; many star wars appear to be correlated with the retrograde periods of Mars, Jupiter and Saturn.

== Recorded star wars ==
A number of star wars are recorded in Mayan inscriptions dating from between 562 and 781. These include:

Date (Gregorian calendar)	Date (Maya calendar)	Winner	Loser
29 April 562	9.6.8.4.2	Caracol/Calakmul	Tikal
25 December 631	9.9.18.16.3	Calakmul/Caracol	Naranjo
2 March 636	9.10.3.2.12	Caracol	Naranjo
2 June 644	9.10.11.9.6	Tortuguero	unnamed polity
10 January 670	9.11.17.8.19	Dos Pilas	Tikal
29 June 672	9.12.0.0.0	Palenque	unnamed polity
9 December 672	9.12.0.8.3	Tikal	Dos Pilas
21 December 677	9.12.5.10.1	La Corona	Tikal
29 February 680	9.12.7.14.1	Naranjo	Caracol
30 May 705	9.13.13.7.2	Dos Pilas	Tikal
28 August 711	9.13.19.13.3	Tonina	Palenque
1 December 735	9.15.4.6.4	Dos Pilas	Seibal
31 March 781	9.17.10.6.1	Piedras Negras	unnamed polity

== See also ==
- Flower war
