= Samanid Civil War of 888 =

Samanid civil war

The Samanid Civil War of 888 was a conflict between the Samanid brothers, Nasr I, ruler of Samarkand and amir of all of the Samanid territories, and Ismail I, who was ruler of Bukhara and Khwarazm. The war took place three years after the Samanid Civil War of 885, which ended with a status quo ante bellum. This time, however, the war ended with a decisive victory for Ismail I. In the aftermath of the war, the victorious brother showed a great deal of respect to his elder and defeated brother and, according to a legend, Ismail even kissed Nasr's hand as a sign of apology. Apparently, Nasr lost much of his power, but he wasn't removed from the Samanid throne; instead, Ismail became de facto ruler of the empire and after death of his brother, he became the amir.
