= Sneferka =

Egyptian pharaoh

- Neferseka, Sekanefer, Neferkaes
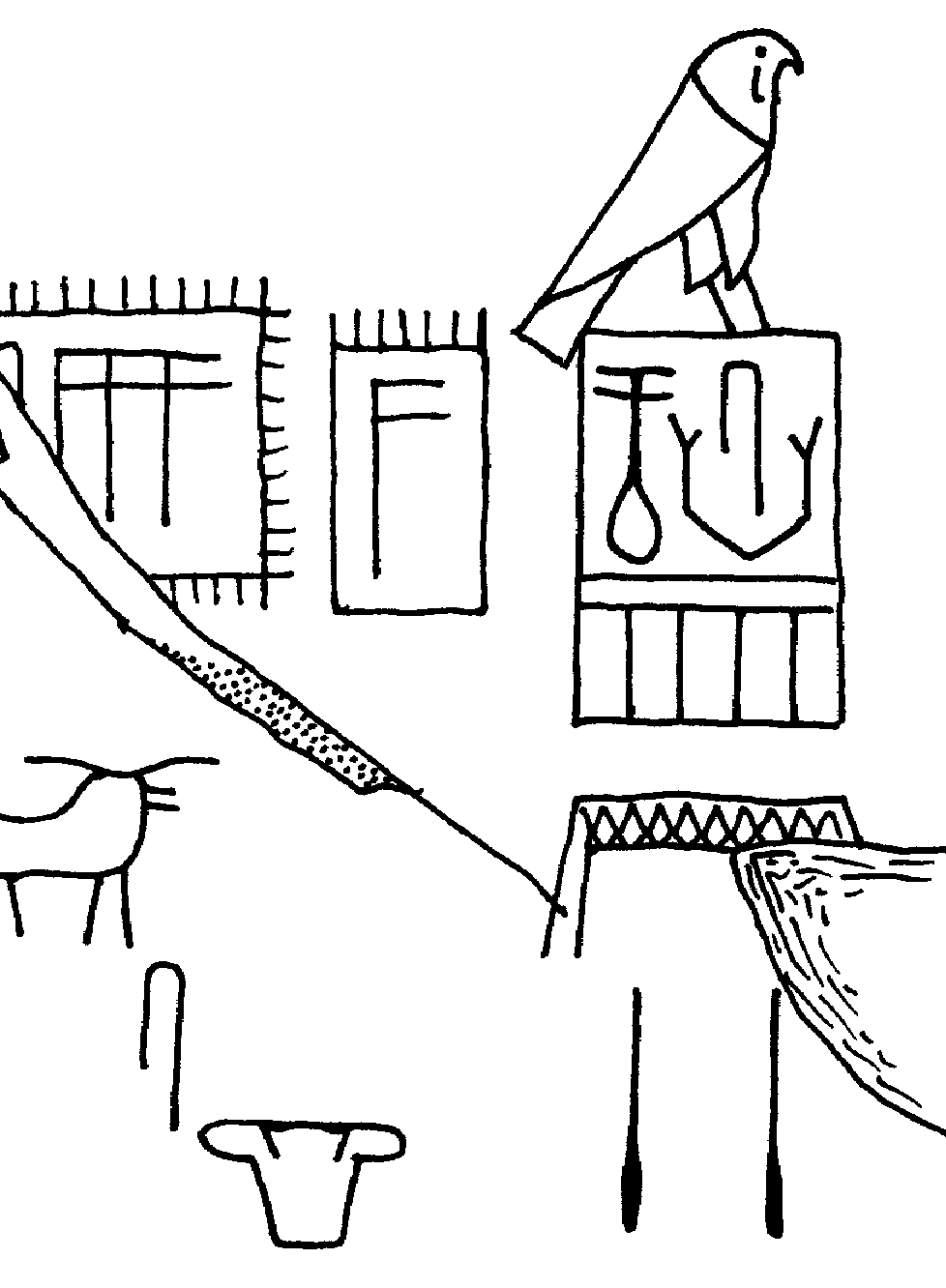
- Slate fragment bearing Sneferka's serekh from Saqqara

Pharaoh
- Reign: short, ca. 2900 BC
- Predecessor: unclear, possibly Qa'a or Horus Bird
- Successor: unclear, possibly Hotepsekhemwy or Horus Bird
Royal titulary
Horus name
Hor-Sneferka
Ḥr.-snfr-k3
My Ka is perfect/He has perfected my Ka
G5	F35 S29 D28
- Dynasty: end of 1st Dynasty

Sneferka was an early Egyptian king who may have ruled at the end of the 1st Dynasty. The exact length of his reign is unknown, but thought to have been very short and his chronological position is unclear.

== Name sources ==
Sneferka's serekh-name is the object of current investigations, because of the unusual typographical order of the hieroglyphic signs within the serekh. This led to several different readings: his name is read as Seneferka, Sneferka, Neferkas, Neferseka and Sekanefer. The serekh-name "Sneferka" appears on several schist- and alabaster vessels. One was found in the mastaba of the high official Merka who served under king Qa'a; a second one in the underground galleries of the step pyramid of king Djoser (3rd Dynasty) and the third was found in an anonymous mastaba, also at Sakkara. A fourth artifact with Sneferka's name is found in the private Georges-Michailidis-Collection (Note: It is the collection of Cairo born collector George Anastase Michaelides(born 1900, death 1973).) but its authenticity is questioned by archaeologists and Egyptologists, since its origin is unknown. Additionally, the inscription on the Michailidis-object is a serekh with no Horus-falcon, which is highly unusual for any Egyptian artifact of that time period.

== Identity ==
Beside Sneferka's serekh, the inscriptions mention several institutions and places already known thanks to finds dating to Qa'a's reign. They are called Qau-Netjeru ("Elevations of the gods") and Ah-Netjer ("Divine palace") and appear in several stone vessel inscriptions from Qa'a's tomb at Abydos. Egyptologists such as Peter Kaplony conclude that the inscriptions prove a chronological adjacency to king Qa'a or that the name "Sneferka" was an alternative name that Qa'a bore for a short time.

Egyptologist Kim Ryholt believes that Sneferka ruled during the midst of 2nd Dynasty and was to be identified with Neferkara I, attested in Ramesside sources. He points to the circumstance that Ramesside scribes often added the symbol of the sun to the names of early dynastic kings, ignoring the fact that the sun was not yet an object of divine adoration at that early time. To support his view, Ryholt points to cartouche names such as Neferkare II and Nebka, which represent early kings and contradictorily have a sun-symbol in their names. Egyptologist Aidan Dodson thinks alike and points to the fact that nearly all serekhs of Sneferka are made "on erasures", thus leading to the conclusion that Sneferka usurped Qa'a's vessels. This behavior was typical for kings who ruled somewhat later than the original owner of the re-used artefacts and who ruled for a very short time only.

== Possible battle with Horus Bird ==
Two artifacts of different origins show the serekh of a king, whose name is highly disputed, for the hieroglyphic sign used to write the king's name is almost illegible. Since at least the depiction of a bird was recognised, the king in question is called "Horus Bird". Egyptologists such as Wolfgang Helck and Peter Kaplony believe that Sneferka and "Horus Bird" fought each other to gain the throne of Egypt. The struggles peaked in the plundering of the royal cemetery of Abydos, which was therefore abandoned. The struggle for the throne was possibly brought to an end by the founder of the 2nd Dynasty, king Hotepsekhemwy. A piece of evidence supporting this theory is the Horus name of Hotepsekhemwy which means "The two powers are reconciled", and could relate to a re-unification of the Egyptian realm after a period of discord.

== Notes ==
Preceded by Qa'a	Pharaoh of Egypt	Succeeded by Horus Bird
