= Tortuguero (Maya site) =

Ruined Maya city in Tabasco, Mexico

Coordinates: 17°41′13″N 92°34′05″W

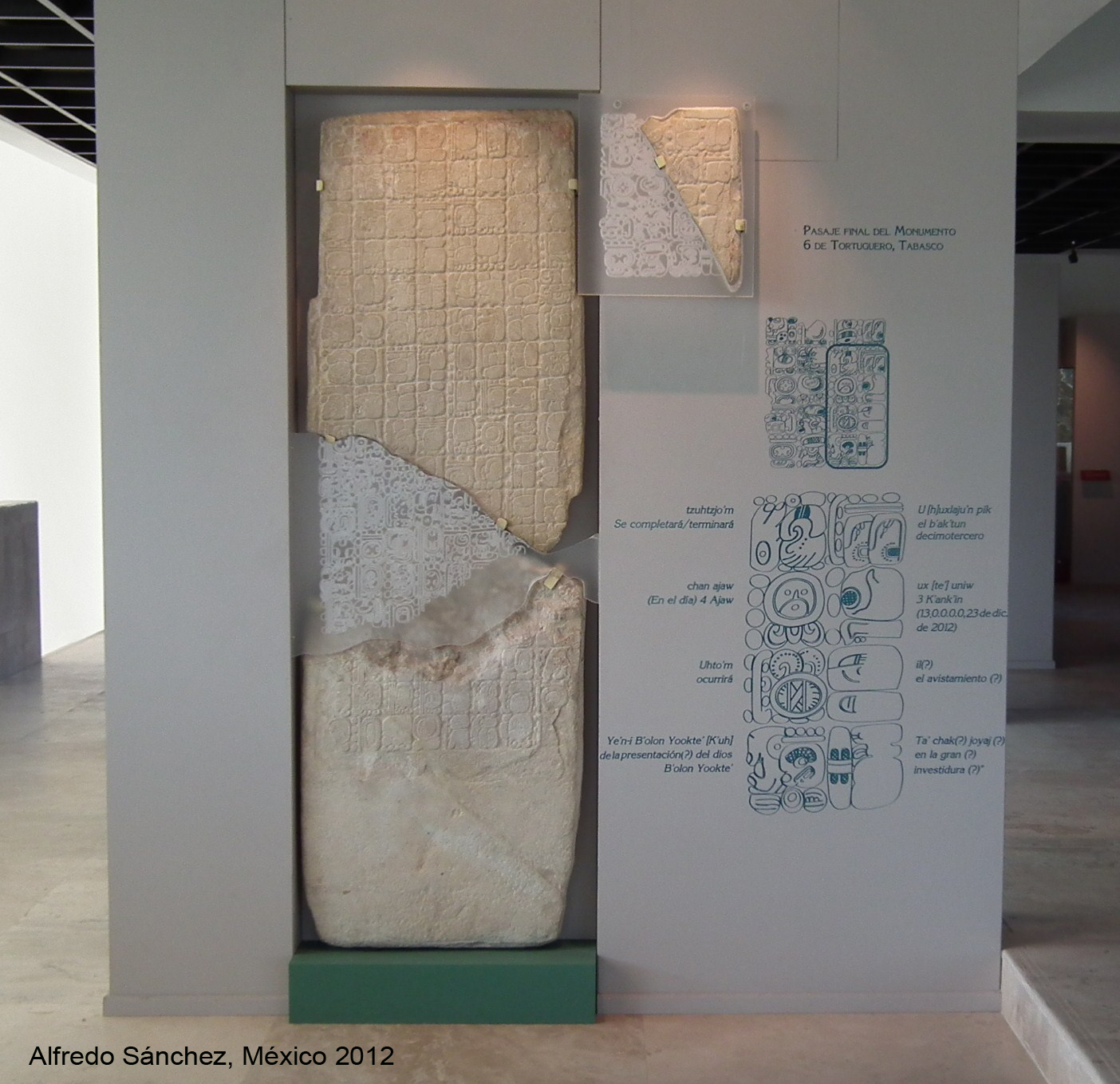
Monument 6 from Tortuguero, today in Carlos Pellicer Museum, in Villahermosa. Tabasco.

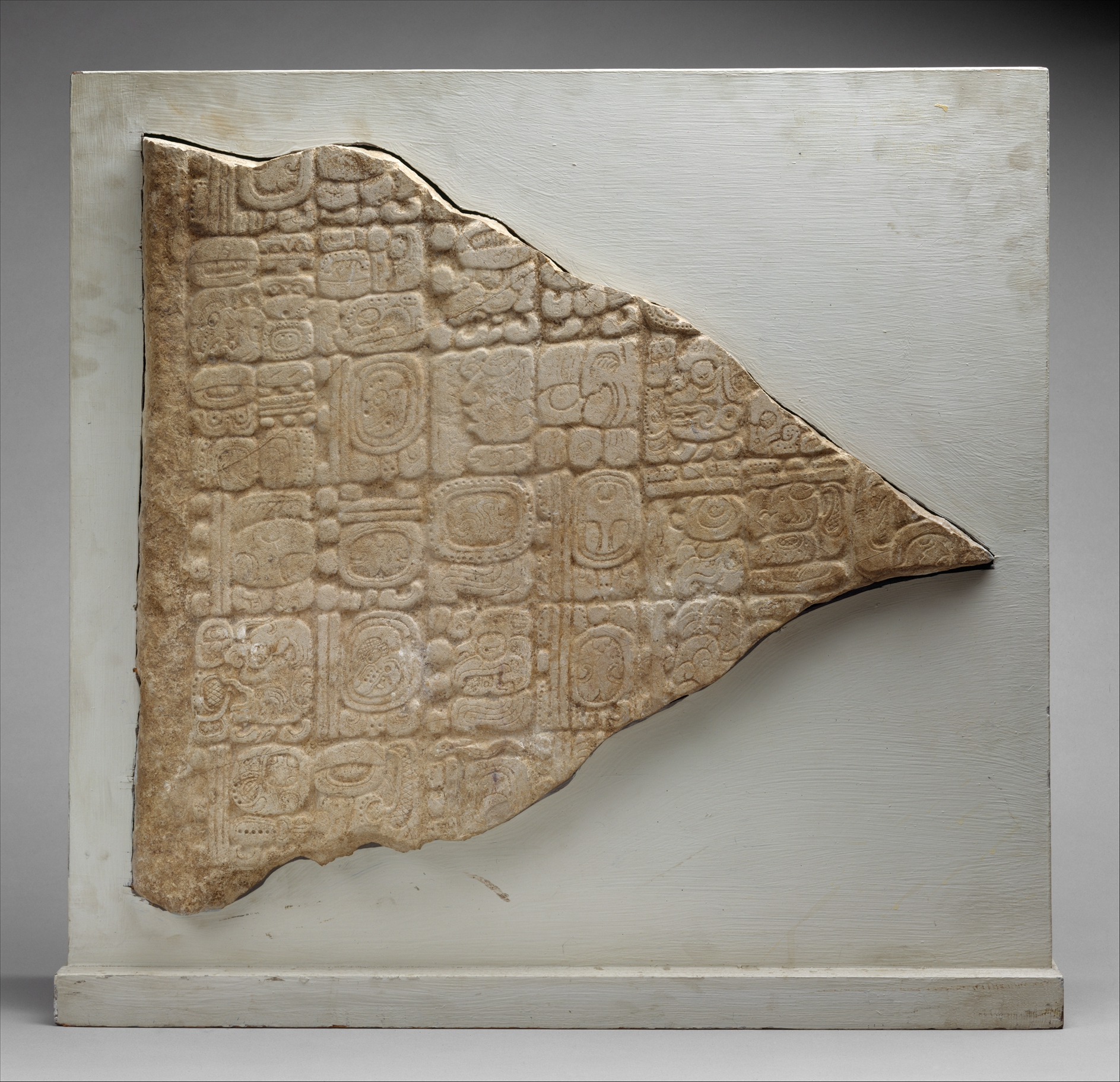
Fragment of Monument 6 from Tortuguero, today in Metropolitan Museum of Art in New York.

Tortuguero (or El Tortuguero) is an archaeological site in southernmost Tabasco, Mexico which supported a Maya city during the Classic period. The site is noteworthy for its use of the B'aakal emblem glyph also found as the primary title at Palenque. The site has been heavily damaged by looting and modern development; in the 1960s, a cement factory was built directly on top of the site.

== History ==
Because of its mid-20th century destruction, little is known about the dynastic lineage of this site. Its history is linked to that of the kingdom of Palenque, as the rulers of Tortuguero used the same emblem glyph as Palenque. Known is that Bahlam Ajaw ruled from 644-679 CE, achieving a victory in a star war against an unknown polity in 644. The result of this war was poetically and tragically commemorated with the sentence "the blood was pooled, the skulls were piled." In 649 CE Bahlam Ajaw conquered Comalcalco, one of the westernmost sites in the Maya world.

== Monument 6: End of the Thirteenth Baktun ==
Monument 6 from Tortuguero has recently generated discussion as it includes the only known inscription depicting the end of the current 13-Bak'tun era in 2012. Grube, Martin and Zender have stated it refers to “the end of the 13th b’ahktun which we will see in the year 2012” and as to what will happen, they say, “...utom, 'it will happen' (O4) followed by something that we cannot read (P4) and he 'will descend' yem (O5). The last glyph begins with ta followed by something. However, this is not the end of the world.”

This happy interpretation is supported by Markus Eberl and Christian Prager. They identify the fragmentary word translated above as "descent" seems to be the same one used during building dedications. They also point to a panel on Temple XIV at Palenque, which shows that a positive event took place on July 29, 931,449 BCE involving a vision serpent named Sak Baak Na' Chapat and his deity K'awiil, which was overseen by B'olon Yokte' K'uh.

Gillespie and Joyce and also Houston and Stuart have concurred that the inscription on Monument 6 concerns the god(s) Bolon Yokte’ K’uh - specifically “…a calendrical event in the early 21st century AD, at which time, apparently, the god may 'descend'.” Stuart has given a more complete translation: “"The Thirteenth Bak'tun" will be finished (on) Four Ahaw, the Third of K'ank'in. ? will occur. (It will be) the descent(?) of the Nine Support (?) God(s) to the ?." All prophecy seekers may be warned that he later explained in his Blog that monument 6 is not stating a prophecy and never featured the 2012 period ending, except to refer to the future Bak’tun ending in order to temporally orient a more significant here-and-now happening of Tortuguero’s local history. Gronemeyer gives an epigraphic analysis and calendrical reconstruction of Monument 6 in his Master’s thesis, with illustrations. It has been indicated that 'Bolon Yokte' K'Uh' could refer to the 9 Lords of the Night who featured in both Aztec and Mayan calendars yet remained unnamed in the latter, as the Nine Lords of the Underworld were known as 'Bolon ti ku'.

Gronemeyer and MacLeod have scrutinized Monument 6 again and offer a new interpretation of the passage dealing with the 13-Bak'tun ending. According to them, the inscription announces the witnessing of the deity Bolon Yokte' K'uh who will be publicly displayed by the occasion of his investiture. By applying several linguistic and ethnographic parallels, this may happen by the enrobing and/or parading of an effigy of the said deity.

== See also ==
- Lords of the Night
