= Hotepsekhemwy =

Ancient Egyptian king

- Bedjatau, Bedjau, Boethos, Bochus
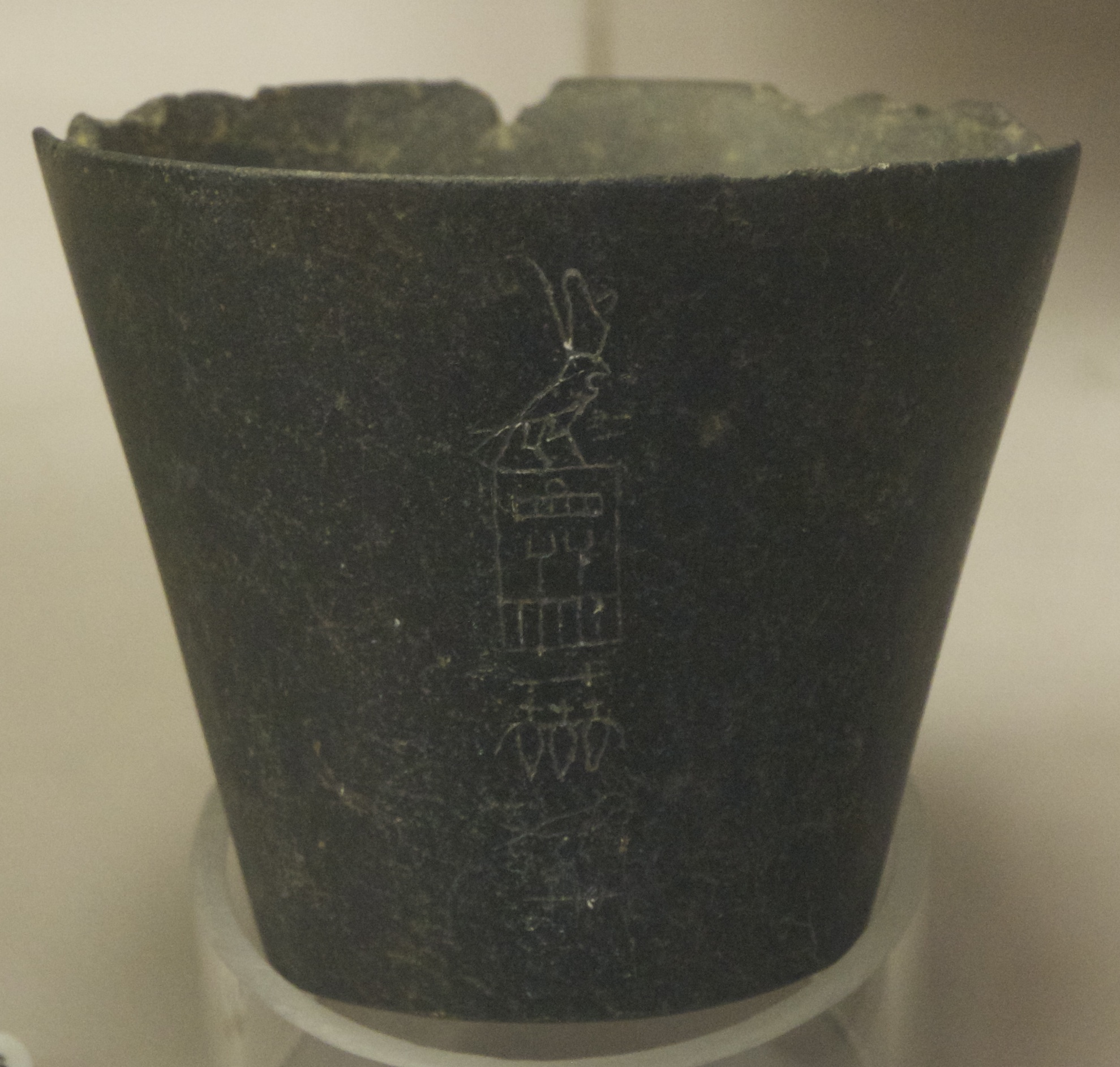
- Stone vase bearing Hotepsekhemwy's serekh, National Archaeological Museum (France)

Pharaoh
- Reign: 25–29, 38 years c. 29th century BC
- Predecessor: Qa'a (most likely) or Sneferka, Horus Bird
- Successor: Nebra
Royal titulary
Horus name
Hor-Hotepsekhemwy
Hr.-htp-sxm.wj
Horus, he who has reconciled the two powers
G5	R4 S42 S42
Nebty name
Sehotep-Nebty
S.htp-nbt.j
He who has reconciled the Two Ladies
G16 S29 R4
Prenomen
Nisut-bitj-Nebty-Hotep
Nsw.t-btj-nbt.j-htp
King of Upper and Lower Egypt, he of the Two Ladies, the satisfied
M23 X1 L2 X1 G16 R4
Giza Writing Board (6th dynasty)
Bedjatau
Bḏ3-t3.w
The smelter
< D58 U28 U30 G43 >
Abydos King List
Bedjau
Bḏ3.w
The smelter
< D58 U28 G43 P11 >
Saqqara King List
Netjerbau
Nṯr-b3.w
Divine of Bas
< R8 G30 >
Turin Canon
...Bau-hetepju
...b3.w-htp.w
...Bas are satisfied
< HASH G30 R4 Z2 > G7
- Children: Perneb, Nebra?
- Burial: Gallery Tomb A, Saqqara (?)
- Dynasty: 2nd Dynasty; starting c. 2890 BC

Hotepsekhemwy is the Horus name of an early Egyptian king who was the founder of the Second Dynasty of Egypt. The exact length of his reign is not known; the Turin canon suggests an improbable 95 years while the ancient Egyptian historian Manetho reports that the reign of "Boëthôs" lasted for 38 years. Egyptologists consider both statements to be misinterpretations or exaggerations. They credit Hotepsekhemwy with either a 25- or a 29-year rule.

== Name sources ==
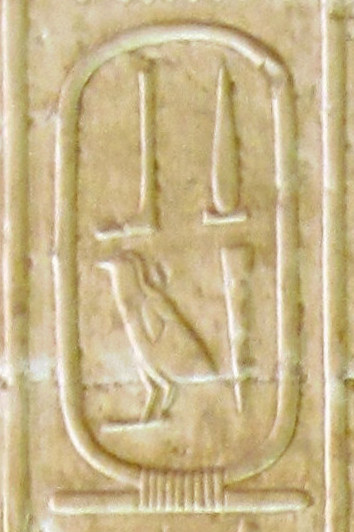
Bedjau, cartouche name of Hotepsekhemwy in the Abydos King List (cartouche no. 9)

Hotepsekhemwy's name has been identified by archaeologists at Saqqara, Giza, Badari and Abydos from clay seal impressions, stone vessels and bone cylinders. Several stone vessel inscriptions mention Hotepsekhemwy along with the name of his successor Nebra.

The Horus name of Hotepsekhemwy is the subject of particular interest to Egyptologists and historians, as it may hint at the turbulent politics of the time. The Egyptian word "Hotep" means "peaceful" and "to be pleased" though it can also mean "conciliation" or "to be reconciled". So Hotepsekhemwy's full name may be read as "the two powers are reconciled" or "pleasing in powers", which suggests a significant political meaning. In this sense, "the two powers" could be a reference to Upper Egypt and Lower Egypt as well as to the major deities Horus and Seth.

From the reign of Hotepsekhemwy onward it became a tradition to write the Horus name and the Nebty name in the same way. It is thought that some kind of philosophic background affected that choice, since the Horus name reveals a clearly defined, symbolic meaning in its translation. Horus- and nebty names being the same might also indicate, that the Horus name was adopted after ascending the throne.

== Family ==
The name of Hotepsekhemwy's wife is unknown. A "son of the king" and "priest of Sopdu" named Perneb might have been his son, but since the clay seals providing his name and titles were found in a gallery tomb which is attributed to two kings equally (Hotepsekhemwy and his successor, Nebra), it is uncertain whose son Perneb really was.

== Identity and possible misreadings ==
Hotepsekhemwy is commonly identified with the Ramesside cartouche names Bedjau from the Abydos King List, Bedjatau from Giza, Netjer-Bau from the Saqqara King List and the name Bau-hetepju from the royal canon of Turin. Egyptologist Wolfgang Helck points to the similar name Bedjatau, which appears in a short king list found on a writing board from the mastaba tomb G1001 of the high official Mesdjeru. "Bedjatau" means "the foundryman" and is thought to be a misreading of the name "Hotepsekhemwy", since the hieroglyphic signs used to write "Hotep" in its full form are very similar to the signs of a pottery kiln and a chick in hieratic writings. The signs of two Sekhem sceptres were misread as a leg and a drill. A similar phenomenon might have occurred in the case of King Khasekhemwy, where the two sceptres in the Horus name were misread as two leg-symbols or two drill-signs. The Abydos king list imitates this Old Kingdom name form of "Bedjatau". The names "Netjerbau" and "Bau-hetepju" are problematic, since Egyptologists can't find any name source from Hotepsekhemwy's time that could have been used to form them.

== Reign ==
=== Possible pacification of strife ===
Little is known about Hotepsekhemwy's reign. Contemporary sources show that he may have gained the throne after a period of political strife, including ephemeral rulers such as Horus Bird and Sneferka (the latter is also thought to be an alternate name used by king Qa'a for a short time). As evidence of this, Egyptologists Wolfgang Helck, Dietrich Wildung and George Reisner point to the tomb of king Qa'a, which was plundered at the end of 1st Dynasty and was restored during the reign of Hotepsekhemwy. The plundering of the cemetery and the unusually conciliatory meaning of the name Hotepsekhemwy may be clues of a dynastic struggle. Additionally, Helck assumes that the kings Sneferka and Horus Bird were omitted from later king lists because their struggles for the Egyptian throne were factors in the collapse of the first dynasty.

=== Constructions ===
Seal impressions provide evidence of a new royal residence called "Horus the shining star" that was constructed by Hotepsekhemwy. He also built a temple near Buto for the little-known deity Netjer-Achty and founded the "Chapel of the White Crown". The white crown is a symbol of Upper Egypt. This is thought to be another clue to the origin of Hotepsekhemwy's dynasty, indicating a likely source of political power. Egyptologists such as Nabil Swelim point out that there is no inscription from Hotepsekhemwy's reign mentioning a Sed festival, indicating the ruler cannot have ruled longer than 30 years (the Sed festival was celebrated as the anniversary marking a reign of 30 years).

=== Chasm ===
The ancient Egyptian historian Manetho called Hotepsekhemwy Boëthôs (apparently altered from the name Bedjau) and reported that during this ruler's reign "a chasm opened near Bubastis and many perished". Although Manetho wrote in the 3rd century BC—over two millennia after the king's actual reign—some Egyptologists think it possible that this anecdote may have been based on fact, since the region near Bubastis is known to be seismically active.

== Tomb ==
The location of Hotepsekhemwy's tomb is uncertain. Egyptologists such as Flinders Petrie, Alessandro Barsanti and Toby Wilkinson believe it could be the giant underground Gallery Tomb A beneath the funeral passage of the Fifth-dynasty-king- Unas-necropolis at Saqqara. Many seal impressions of king Hotepsekhemwy have been found in these galleries.

Egyptologists such as Wolfgang Helck and Peter Munro are not convinced and think that Gallery Tomb B is instead the burial site of king Nebra, as several seal impressions of this ruler were also found there.

The more accepted theory is that Hotepsekhemwy and his son Nebra shared Tomb A.

== Gallery ==
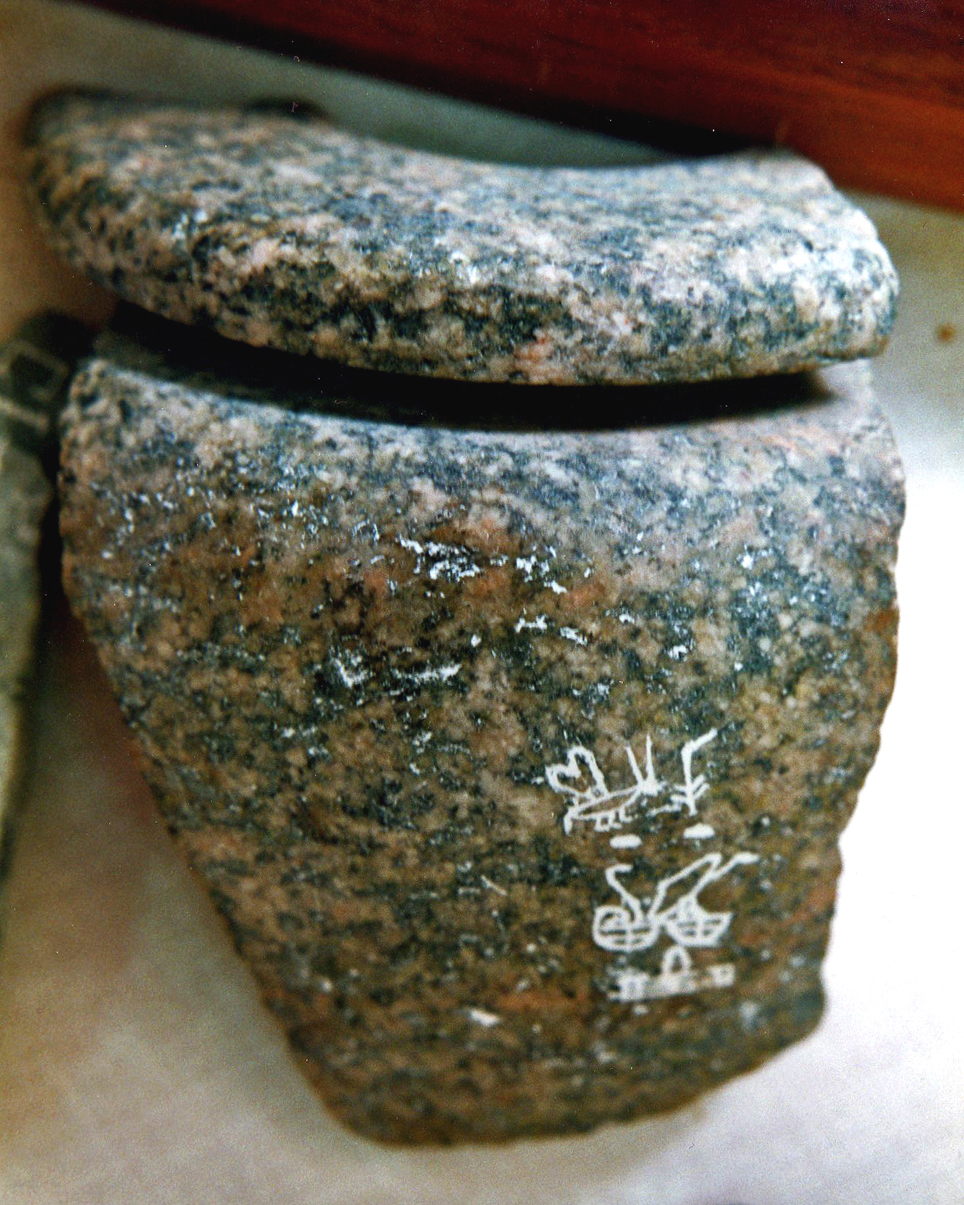
Vessel inscription from the Pyramid of Djoser with Hotep's prenomen, Egyptian Museum.

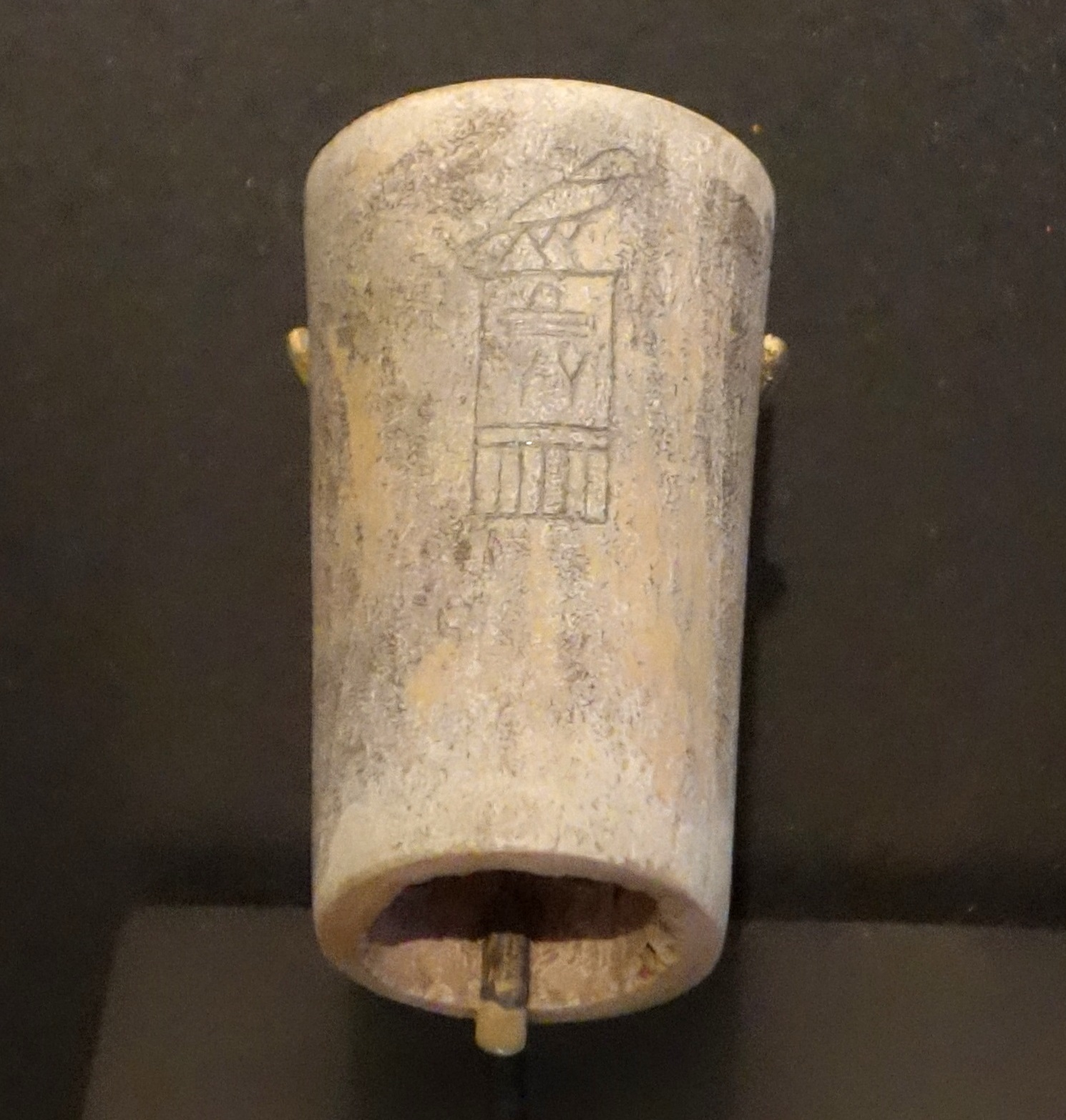
Bone cylinder inscribed with the serekh of Hotep, Brooklyn Museum.

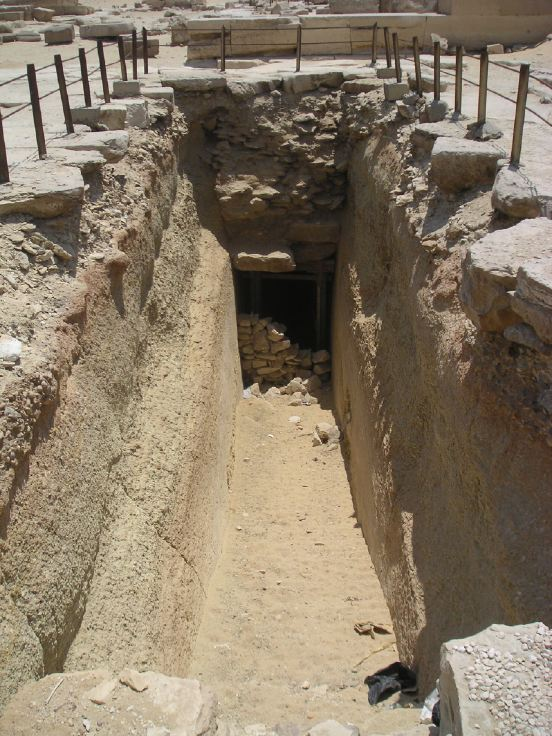
Entrance to the gallery tomb beneath the Unas passway, Saqqara.
