= Horus Bird (pharaoh) =

Sovereign

- Horus Ba
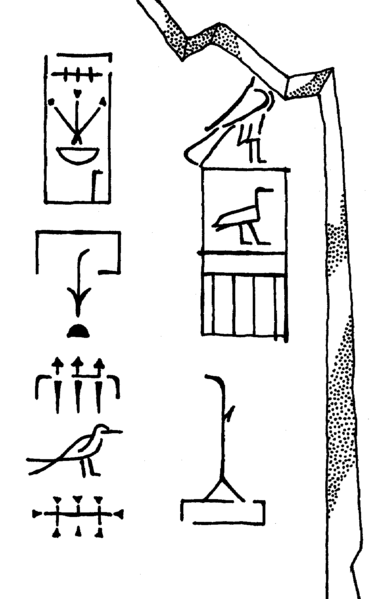
- Horus name of "Horus-Bird" inscribed on fragment P.D.IV n.108 found in Djoser's pyramid complex at Saqqara.

Pharaoh
- Reign: c. 2900 BCE, Early Dynastic Period
- Predecessor: Uncertain, possibly Qa'a or Sneferka
- Successor: Unclear, likely Hotepsekhemwy
Royal titulary
Horus name
Hor-Ba
Ḥr.-b3
Soul of Horus
G5	G38
- Dynasty: First Dynasty

Horus Bird, also known as Horus-Ba, may have been a pharaoh who may have had a very short reign between the First and Second Dynasty of Egypt. Horus-Bird's burial site is unknown.

== Name sources ==
There are very few reliable name sources for Horus-Bird.

1. The first known attestation of this king may be a serekh with an undetailed bird found by Flinders Petrie in the tomb of Qa'a at Abydos.
2. A more legible inscription showing a serekh with a bird was later found on a vessel fragment PD IV n.108 in Djoser's pyramid complex at Saqqara.
3. An inscription on a schist vase (P.D. IV n.97) from Djoser's pyramid complex could also refer to Horus-Bird.

Because the hieroglyphic sign is written in such an erratic way, the correct reading remains uncertain. Whilst Egyptologists such as Wolfgang Helck and Peter Kaplony see a depiction of a goose, they read the name as Sa (which would make it a “Son of Horus”) or as Geb(eb) (which would make it an "Heir of Horus"). Egyptologist Nabil Swelim instead sees a depiction of a saddle-billed stork and reads Ba (making it a “Soul of Horus”).

== Identity ==
Very little is known about King Horus-Bird. The few archaeological evidences point to the existence of one or more ephemeral rulers following Qa'a's death and before Hotepsekhemwy of which Horus-Bird may have been one.

Egyptologists such as Jaroslav Černý and Kaplony think that Horus-Bird could be identical to the likewise sparsely attested King Horus-Ba. Indeed, this ruler wrote his name with the leg sign or the leg and ram signs, which read "Ba". Černý and Kaplony think that the bird in the serekh of Horus-Bird is the goose sign with the same transcription, "Ba". In this case Horus-Ba and Horus "Bird" could be the same historical figure. Černý and Kaplony's theory is not commonly accepted; the presence of the Horus-Bird serekh in the tomb of Qa'a pointing rather to an interregnum with Horus-Bird between the first and second dynasties.

== Possible battle with Sneferka ==
Egyptologists such as Wolfgang Helck and Peter Kaplony believe that Horus Bird and Sneferka fought each other to gain the throne of Egypt. The struggles peaked in the plundering of the royal cemetery of Abydos, which was therefore abandoned. The struggle for the throne was possibly brought to an end by the founder of the 2nd dynasty, king Hotepsekhemwy. A piece of evidence supporting this theory is the Horus name of Hotepsekhemwy which means "The two powers are reconciled", and could relate to a re-unification of the Egyptian realm after a period of discord.

Preceded by Sneferka	Pharaoh of Egypt	Succeeded by Hotepsekhemwy
