= Wadi Sabra (river) =

Canyon in Jordan

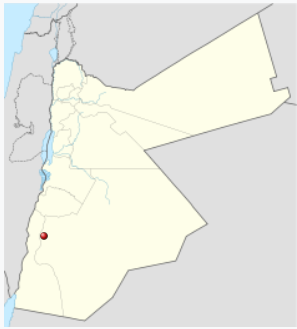
Map showing location of Wadi Sabra, Jordan.

Wadi Sabra, is a canyon wadi in Jordan noted for its ruins.

The Wadi has several unexcavated tombs and houses. There is also ruins of a theater, a Nabataean sanctuary and Bronze Age petroglyphs along its walls. The Wadi is 8 kilometers south of Petra.

The first European to the wadi was the Frenchman L. de Laborde, who reached Wadi Sabra in 1828.
