= Machaerus =

Hilltop palace in Jordan

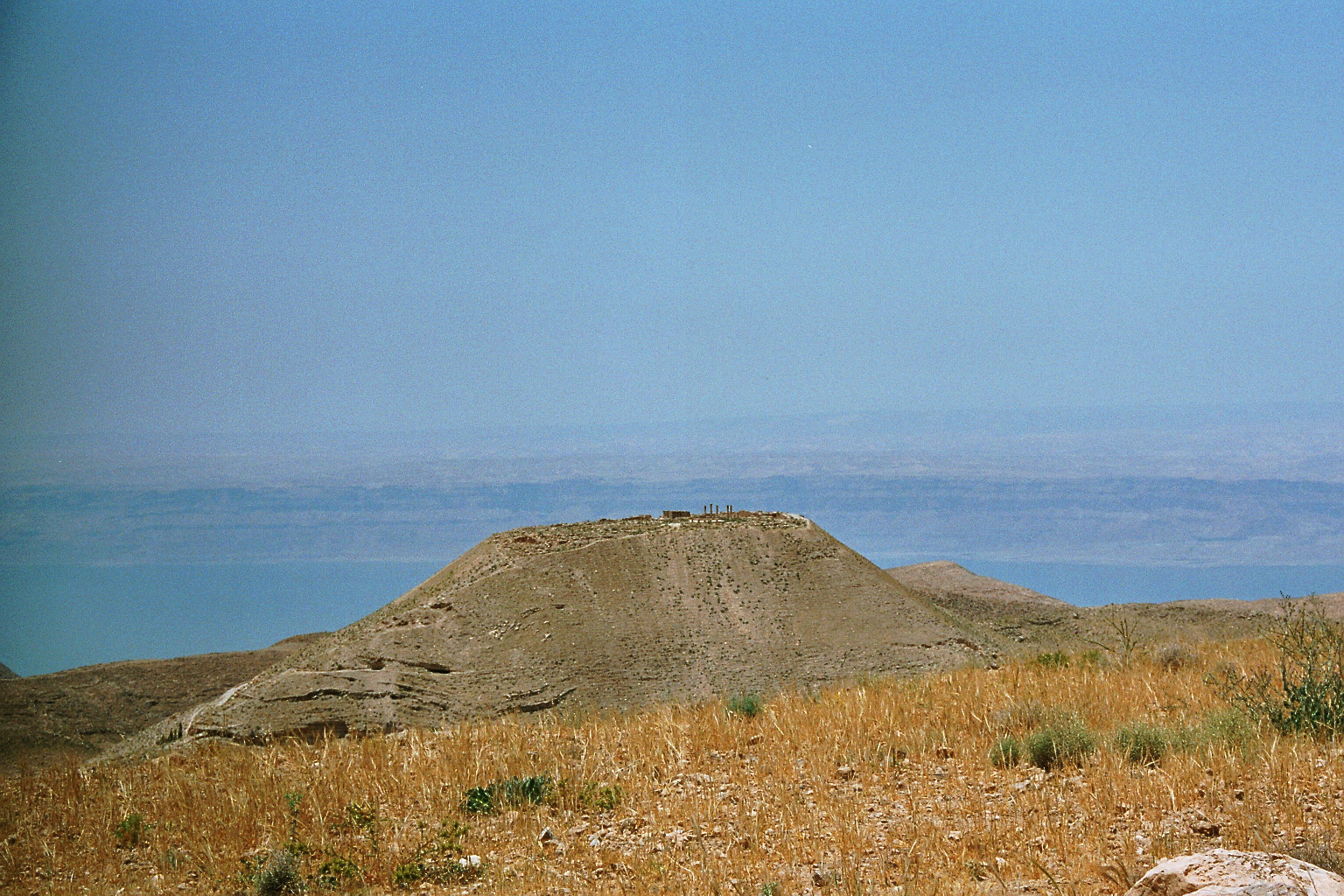
- Panoramic view of Machaerus with the Dead Sea in the background.

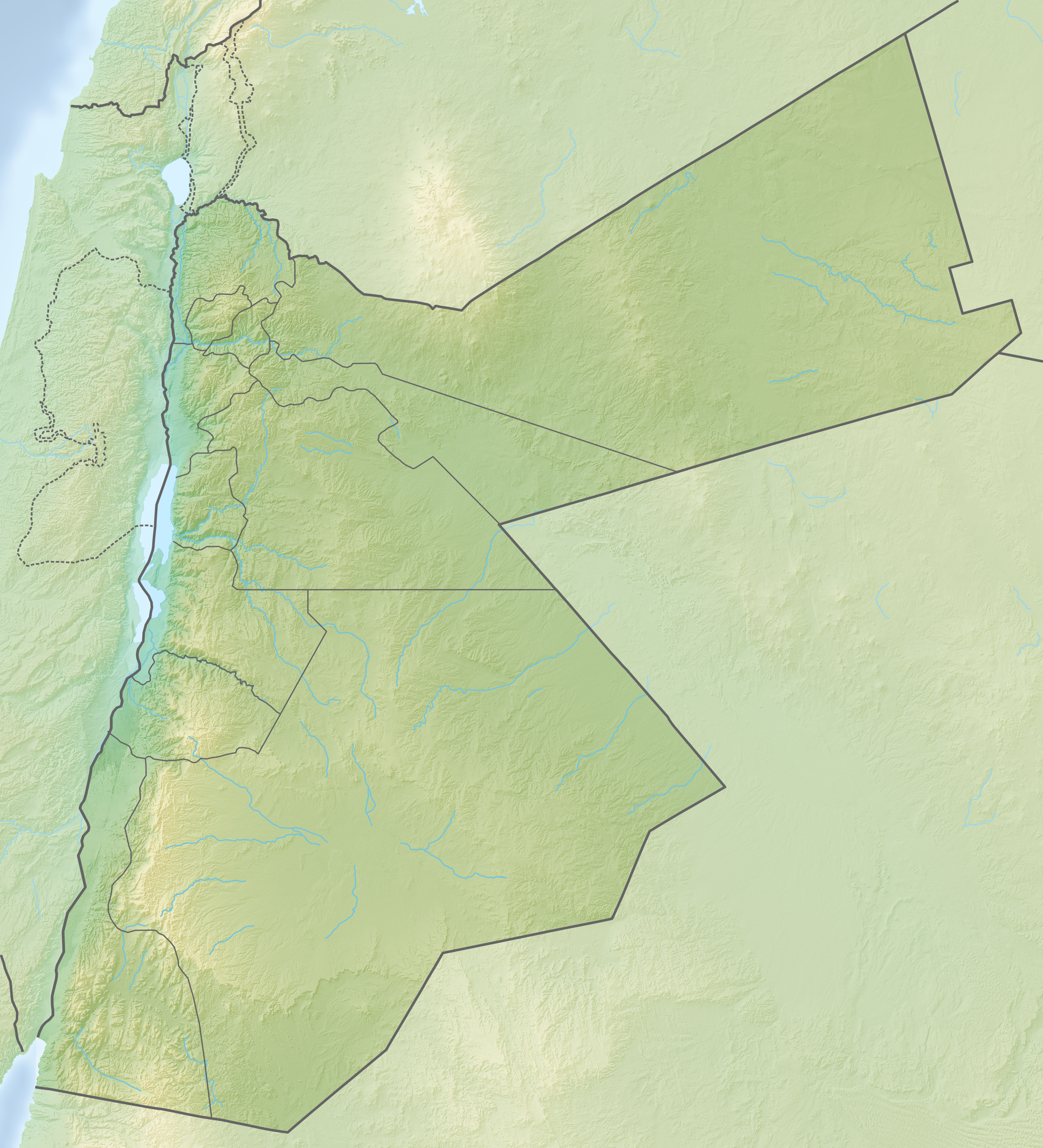
- Location within Jordan
- 31°34′3″N 35°37′27″E
- Type: Fortification, Palace
- Periods: Hellenistic to Roman period
- Cultures: Hasmonean, Herodian
- Location: Madaba Governorate, Jordan
- Region: Perea

History
- Built: c. 90 BCE
- Built by: Alexander Jannaeus
- Abandoned: c. 72 CE

Site notes
- Condition: In ruins
- Public access: Yes

Machaerus (Μαχαιροῦς, from Ancient Greek: μάχαιρα, lit. 'makhaira' [sword]; Hebrew: מכוור, romanized: Mikhwar; Arabic: قلعة مكاور, romanized: Qala'at Mukawir, lit. 'Mukawir Castle') was a Hasmonean hilltop palace and desert fortress, rebuilt by Herod and now in ruins, near the village of Mukawir in modern-day Jordan. The site is located 25 km (16 mi) southeast of the mouth of the Jordan River overlooking the Dead Sea.

Machaerus was built by Hasmonean king Alexander Jannaeus (r. 104–78 BCE). Destroyed later by Roman general Gabinius in 57 BCE during conflicts with Aristobulus II, it was subsequently rebuilt and expanded by Herod, who envisioned it as a potential refuge. Herod constructed a palace, cisterns, a mikveh, a triclinium, and a peristyle within the fortress.

Machareus was then inherited by Herod's son Antipas, who married one of his half-brother's wife after divorcing his Nabataean wife that then fled to her father King Aretas IV. John the Baptist was imprisoned after condemning Antipas's new marriage as adulterous, and was later beheaded in Machareus around 32 AD, according to the Jewish-Roman historian Flavius Josephus and the New Testament. Machareus was then destroyed by Arab Nabatean King Aretas IV's troops, who defeated Antipas's troops as retaliation in a major battle in 36 AD.

After the fall of Jerusalem during the First Jewish–Roman War, the fortress became a magnet for resistance against Roman rule. Following a siege by Legio X Fretensis under Bassus in 71 CE, the Jewish defenders eventually surrendered after Eleazar, a key leader, was captured. However, the Romans reneged on their agreement regarding the non-Jewish inhabitants, massacring the men and enslaving the women and children. Machareus then disappears from history for two thousand years after the 70 AD destruction.

== History ==
The fortress Machaerus was originally built by the Hasmonean king, Alexander Jannaeus (104–78 BC) in about the year 90 BC, serving an important strategic position. Its high, rocky vantage point was difficult to access, and invasions from the east could be easily spotted from there. It was also in line of sight of other Hasmonean (and later Herodian) citadels, so other fortresses could be signaled if trouble appeared on the horizon. Nevertheless, it was destroyed by Pompey's general Gabinius in 57 BC, but later rebuilt by Herod the Great in 30 BC to be used as a military base to safeguard his territories east of the Jordan. According to the site's excavators, the precision of the architectural design indicates the involvements of highly trained royal architects, who are proposed to have arrived from the Ptolemaic court of Alexandria sometime after the Battle of Actium.

=== Beheading of John the Baptist ===
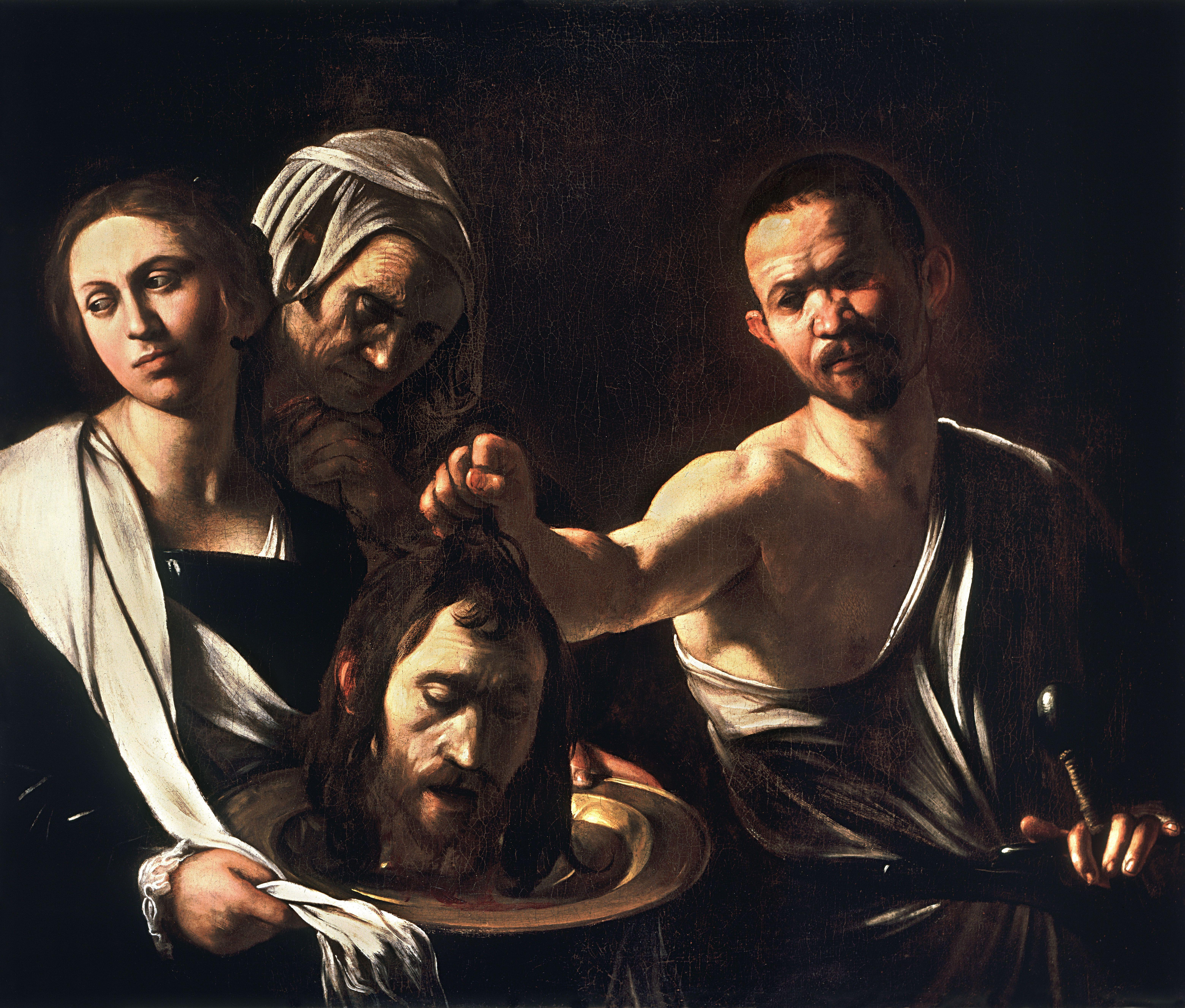
Salome with the Head of John the Baptist by Caravaggio, National Gallery, London, c. 1607–1610

Upon the death of Herod the Great, the fortress was passed to his son, Herod Antipas, who ruled from 4 BC until 39 AD. It was during this time, at the beginning of the first century of the Common Era, that John the Baptist was imprisoned and beheaded at Machaerus.

Herod Antipas was married to Phasaelis, the daughter of the Nabataean king Aretas IV. In 27 AD, Antipas fell in love with Herodias, the wife of one of his half-brothers and his niece. Seeking to marry Herodias, he divorced his Nabataean wife, who fled to her father.

John the Baptist denounced the relationship between Antipas and Herodias as adulterous, resulting in his arrest and imprisonment at Machaerus. According to the Gospel of Matthew, Herodias later sought revenge against John by having her daughter Salome dance before Antipas and his guests during his birthday celebration. Pleased by her performance, Antipas swore to grant Salome whatever she requested. At her mother's prompting, Salome asked for John's head on a platter. Although distressed by the request, Antipas honored his oath and ordered John's execution in prison.

In 36 AD, Aretas IV's Nabataean forces defeated Antipas's army in a major battle. The defeat was seen as Aretas's retaliation against his former son-in-law and was followed by the destruction of Machaerus.

=== Roman rule ===
Machaerus lit up during sunset in 2026, during a performance of the Handel's Messiah in the village of Mukawir

After the deposition and banishment of Herod Antipas in 39 AD, Machaerus passed to Herod Agrippa I until his death in AD 44, after which it came under Roman control. Jewish rebels took control after AD 66 during the First Jewish Revolt. The fort fell to the Romans in the mop-up operations that followed Titus's destruction of Jerusalem in AD 70. Shortly after defeating the Jewish garrison of Herodium, the Roman legate Lucilius Bassus advanced on Machaerus with his troops and began its siege. Bassus first set engineers to fill the southeastern ravine and raise a ramp; he then began a second ramp from the higher northwestern ridge and ringed the site with a rectangular circumvallation studded with fixed camps to prevent escape.

According to Josephus, raiding parties from the garrison harassed the Roman siege force, with losses on both sides, until a turning point: a young, well-born Jewish fighter, Eleazar, lingered outside the gates and was seized by a Roman soldier named Rufus. Bassus had Eleazar flogged in full view of the fortress and ordered a cross brought up; Eleazar then called on his horrified comrades to save themselves by surrendering. Envoys came out to negotiate, and Bassus agreed to spare Eleazar and grant safe conduct to the Jewish defenders. The non-Jewish inhabitants, realizing the terms covered only Jews, attempted a night escape. Warned by their opponents in the upper citadel, the Romans intercepted the breakout: some forced their way through, but 1,700 men were reportedly killed and the women and children taken and sold. The Jewish rebels were allowed to depart, and the fortress was demolished, leaving only its foundations.

Machareus then disappears from history for two thousand years after the 70 AD destruction.

== Design ==
Josephus gives a full description of Machaerus in The Jewish War 7.6.1 ff. The hilltop, which stands about 1,100 meters above Dead Sea level, is surrounded on all sides by deep ravines which provide great natural strength. The valley on the west extends 60 stadia to the Dead Sea (Josephus refers to it as Lake Asphaltitis). The valley on the east descends to a depth of a hundred cubits (150 ft).

Herod the Great regarded the place as deserving the strongest fortification, particularly because of its proximity to Arabia. On top of the mountain, surrounding the crest, he built a fortress wall, 100 meters long and 60 meters wide with three corner towers, each sixty cubits (90 ft) high. The palace was built in the center of the fortified area. Numerous cisterns were provided to collect rain water.

The royal courtyard is considered one of the closest and best existing archaeological parallels to the Herodian Gabbatha in the Jerusalem Praetorium, where Pontius Pilate judged Jesus of Nazareth.

== Excavation ==
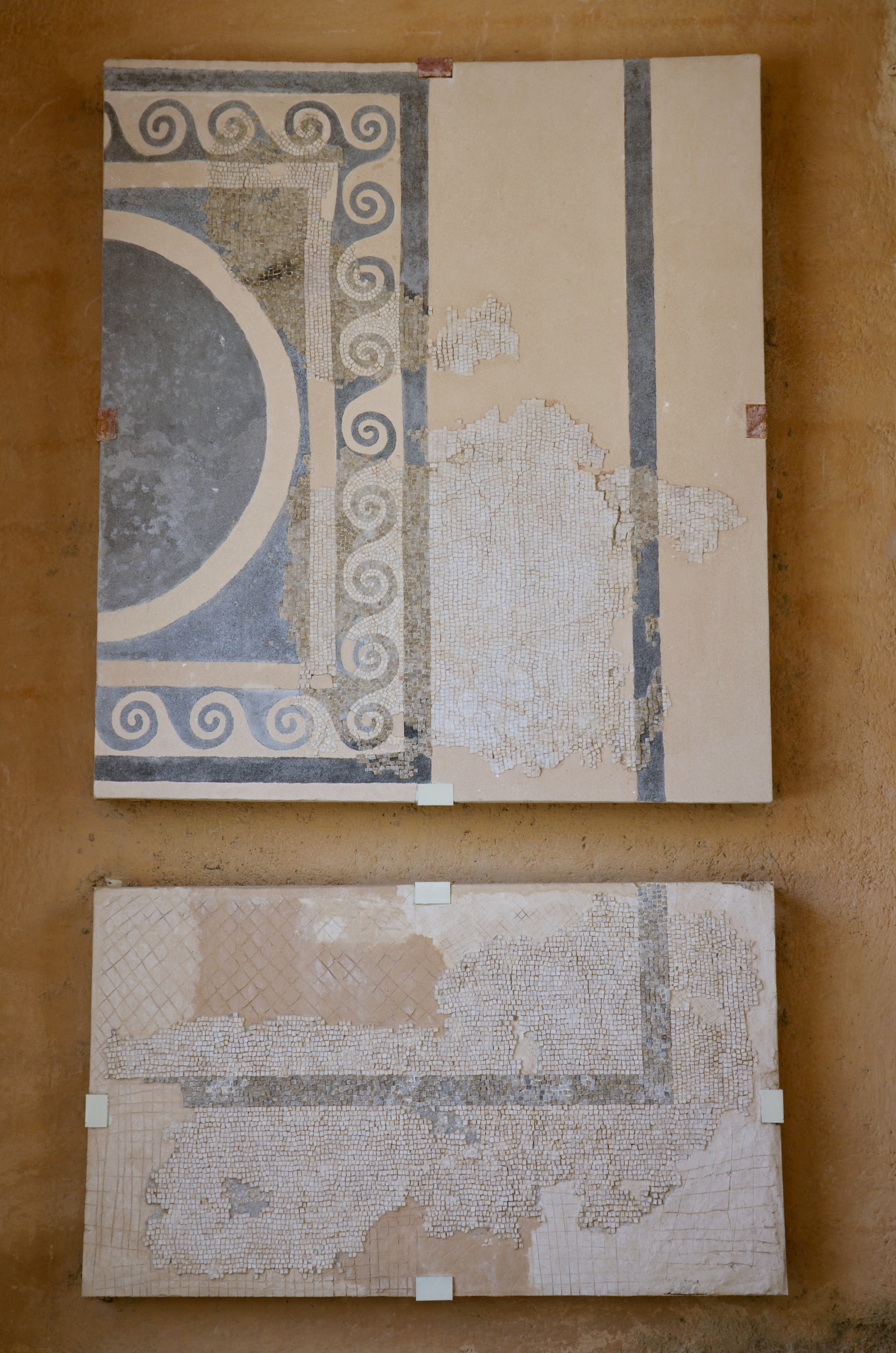
A bath mosaic found at Machaerus dating to the first century AD, which is considered the oldest mosaic discovered in Jordan

The village on the plateau to the east of the mountain is called Mukawir (Arabic: مكاور, sometimes also rendered as Mkawer). The site was visited in 1807 by the Frisian explorer Ulrich Jasper Seetzen, and the name of the village reminded him of the name of Machaerus in Greek. The archaeological excavation of Machaerus was begun in 1968 by Jerry Vardaman, then of the Southern Baptist Theological Seminary, and later director of the Cobb Institute of Archaeology at Mississippi State University. In 1973, the German scholar, August Strobel, identified and studied the wall by which the Romans encircled the defenders within the fortress. In 1978–1981, excavations were carried out by Virgilio Corbo, Stanislao Loffreda and Michele Piccirillo, from the Studium Biblicum Franciscanum in Jerusalem.

Within the fortified area are the ruins of the Herodian palace, including rooms, a large courtyard, and an elaborate bath, with fragments of the floor mosaic still remaining. Farther down the eastern slope of the hill are other walls and towers, perhaps representing the "lower town," of which Josephus also wrote. Traceable also, coming from the east, is the aqueduct that brought water to the cisterns of the fortress. Pottery found in the area extends from late Hellenistic to Roman periods and confirms the two main periods of occupation, namely, Hasmonean (90–57 BC) and Herodian (30 BC – AD 72), with a brief reoccupation soon after AD 72 and then nothing further—so complete and systematic was the destruction visited upon the site by the Romans.

In 2020, a limestone relief from the Herodian period was discovered in Machaerus. Its decoration depicts a trilobate cluster of grapes together with a pomegranate wreath, and its design is closely comparable to the frieze carved above the entrance of the Tomb of the Kings in Jerusalem. On the basis of this comparison, the excavators of Machaerus have argued that the Jerusalem monument was originally commissioned by Herod the Great, rather than by Herod Agrippa I, as previously proposed by some scholars.

== Roads ==
An ancient road linking Machaerus with the thermal springs at Callirhoe on the eastern shore of the Dead Sea survives in long stretches as a broad, paved route across the slopes of the Moab mountains. Its lower section was paved and cleared of stones, with some stretches cut directly into the bedrock. The road is 3.5–6 metres wide, and its margins preserve kerbstones and built retaining walls up to 1 metre high. Its precise date is uncertain. Archaeologist Chaim Ben David considers it to predate the Roman siege and attributes it to the Herodian or possibly the earlier Hasmonean period, describing it as the best-preserved example of a road datable to the late Second Temple period.

== Anastylosis ==
In the spring of 2014, archeologist Győző Vörös, with a team from the Hungarian Academy of Arts and in cooperation with Prince El Hassan bin Talal and Monther Jamhawi, director general of antiquities in Jordan, completed a reconstruction and re-erection of two ancient columns at the site on the basis of the principle of anastylosis. One Doric column from the royal courtyard and one Ionic column from the royal bathhouse were cleaned and conserved in situ and joined with stainless steel empolia (plugs) which were inserted into the original empolia holes in the center of the column. The team also created a digital reconstruction of what the palace would have looked like, based on their archaeological findings.

In the early 2020s, two complete Herodian columns that had been re-erected at the site were vandalized and demolished in separate events: one Doric column in February 2022 and another Ionic column in March 2023. Following King Abdullah II's visit to Machaerus on 12 September 2023, and upon his instruction, the Jordanian Department of Antiquities re-erected both columns again in November 2023.

== See also ==
- Gamla
- Herod Antipas
- Herod the Great
- Khirbet el-Hammam (Narbata)

Hasmonean desert fortresses

- Alexandreion/Alexandrion/Alexandrium
- Cypros (fortress)
- Dok (Dagon) on the Mount of Temptation
- Hyrcania (fortress)
- Khirbet Mudayna as-Saliya
- Masada
