= Bani Hamida =

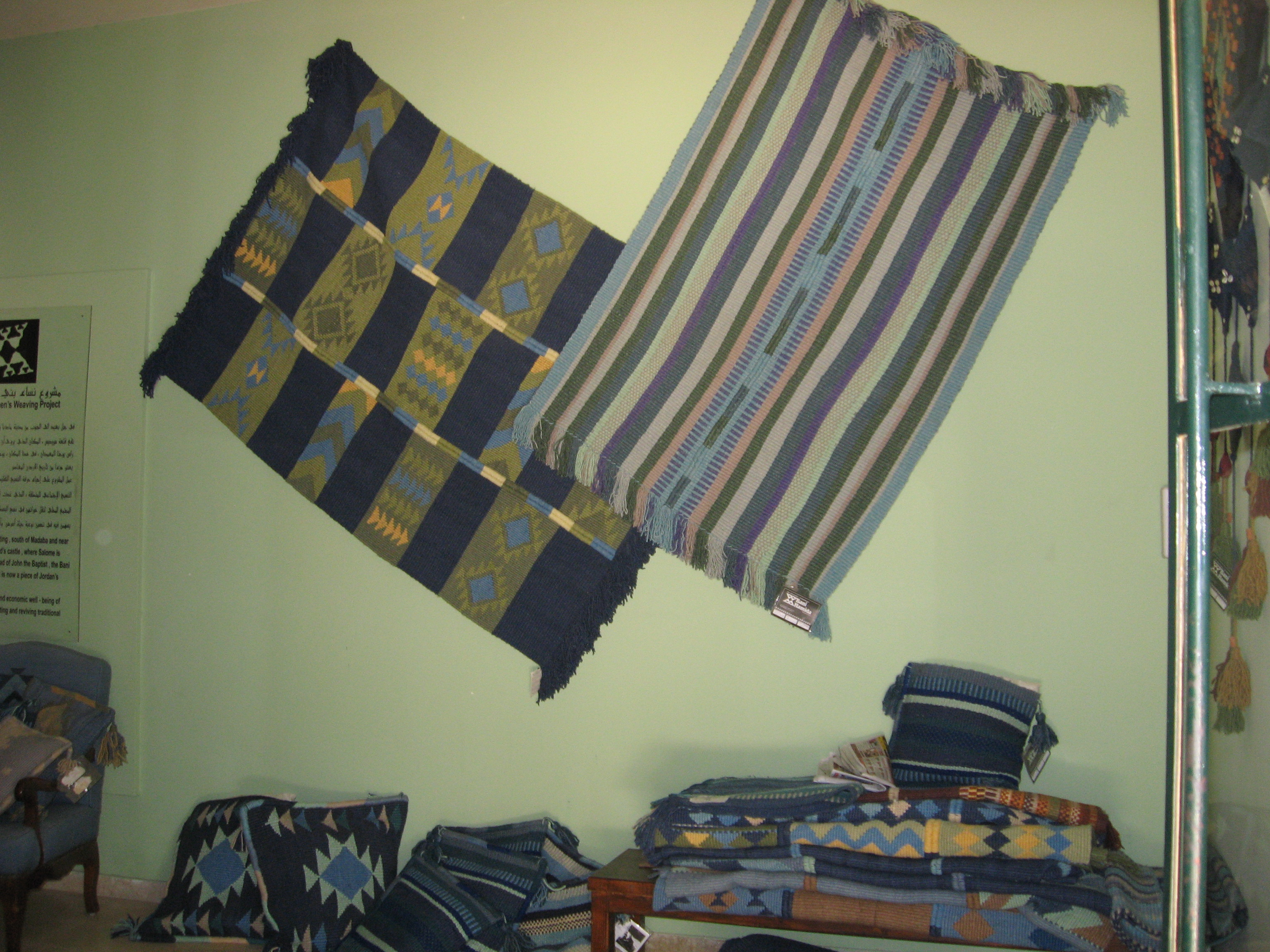
Bani Hamida Weavings

The Bani Hamida (Arabic: بنو حميدة) are a nomadic Bedouin tribe living in Jordan.

== History ==
=== Origins of the Bani Hamida ===
According to the historian Ihsan al-Nimr, the Bani Hamida were present in the Karak region during the period of dominance by the Al-Amro clan. Al-Nimr describes the Al-Amro as belonging to the Judham tribe and notes that the Bani Hamida shared the same tribal ancestry, belonging to Judham, alongside several other tribes of southern Jordan and the Balqa region, including the Bani Sakhr, Bani Mahdi, and Hutaym. He also recounts that warfare among the major tribal groups of southern Jordan including the Howeitat, Bani Atiyah, Al-Amro, Bani Sakhr, and Bani Hamida—led to shifting alliances. According to his account, the rise of Yusuf Al-Majali in Karak and his alliance with the Bani Atiyah resulted in the defeat of the Bani Sakhr and the end of their collection of khuwwa (protection tribute).

=== 19th century ===
In 1869, members of the Bani Hamida shattered the recently discovered Moabite Stone into pieces by lighting a fire under it and then pouring cold water over it. The stele was discovered by Henry Baker Tristram on his trip with Sheikh Sattam Al-Fayez when they visited the Bani Hamida's territory. When Emir Fendi Al-Fayez sent his cousin's son Eid to negotiate the sale of the stone, members of the Bani Hamida decided to destroy the stone as an act of defiance of the Ottomans. In the aftermath, several Bani Hamida were killed. Though many of the fragments were later retrieved, the full text, one of the earliest Hebrew-related scripts, was only preserved through a hurried copy made under difficult conditions.

The Bani Hamida also had a reputation for breeding "the best blood horses in Moab", according to explorer Charles M. Doughty, 1876.

In 1891, there was fighting between the Beni Sakher tribe and the Bani Hamida.

F.J. Bliss, who visited in March 1895, writes that "the sheikhs of the Hamideh were very civil and anxious to show us all the torn stones which is their phrase covering inscriptions and ornamentation." He was travelling with permission from the Ottoman authorities, who in December 1893 had installed a governor in Karak who improved security for travellers.

John Edward Gray Hill and his wife, also travelling in 1895 on their fourth attempt to visit Petra, met the Hameideh south of Madeba. Five years earlier, the tribe had "harassed" Hill and tried to stop them. Their previous guide Abu Seyne was unable to guide them due to a blood feud. Hill describes travelling in beautiful spring weather through country green with young corn. At Wadi Waleh they found a "sweet little stream amongst the oleanders" from which their cook caught fish by throwing something into the water which "made them insensible for a brief period". One day's travel from Madeba brought them to Dhiban where there was a military camp. Here the Sheikh of the Hameideh, "who had troubled us in 1890", offered to show an inscription "up a winding valley". After walking "a long way in the hot sun" Hill was shown a flat stone "on which three or four Greek (?) letters appeared". The following night, while camped halfway on their journey to Kerak, their tents were fired on by members of the Mujelli tribe. About twenty shots were fired, but no-one was hurt. Hill speculates that the attack was to deter them from making claims against the Mujelli for compensation for "their robbery and detention of us in 1890".

In a 1924 account of Transjordan, the population was distinguished between townsmen, peasants, and Bedouin groups, with a specific classification designated for "cultivating Bedouins." The primary groups identified under this classification included the Beni Hasan, the Adwan of the Balqa, and the Bani Hamida, who lived between the Wala and Mojib rivers. While their lifestyle shared similarities with desert Bedouins, these cultivating tribes rarely camped outside their own territories, farmed the land in the same manner as the peasant population, and paid identical taxes. Because they maintained agricultural crops and permanent, fixed locations, they were highly vulnerable to external raids and rarely initiated conflicts themselves. Consequently, despite localized feuds between individual tribes and villages, the cultivating Bedouins typically allied with the settled peasants for mutual defense against nomadic desert Bedouins migrating seasonally from Central Arabia.

=== 20th century ===
In 1985, 12 women of the tribe launched a weaving project, which produces woven items in traditionally bright colors. Traditional ground looms, assembled using stones and sticks, are used for the weaving, and the products can be found at numerous outlets in Jordan and abroad. Visitors can stop by the weaving rooms, located in the village of Mukawir, to see how the rugs are made. The women also make decorative candles.
