= Mukawir =

Mukawir مكاور
- Village
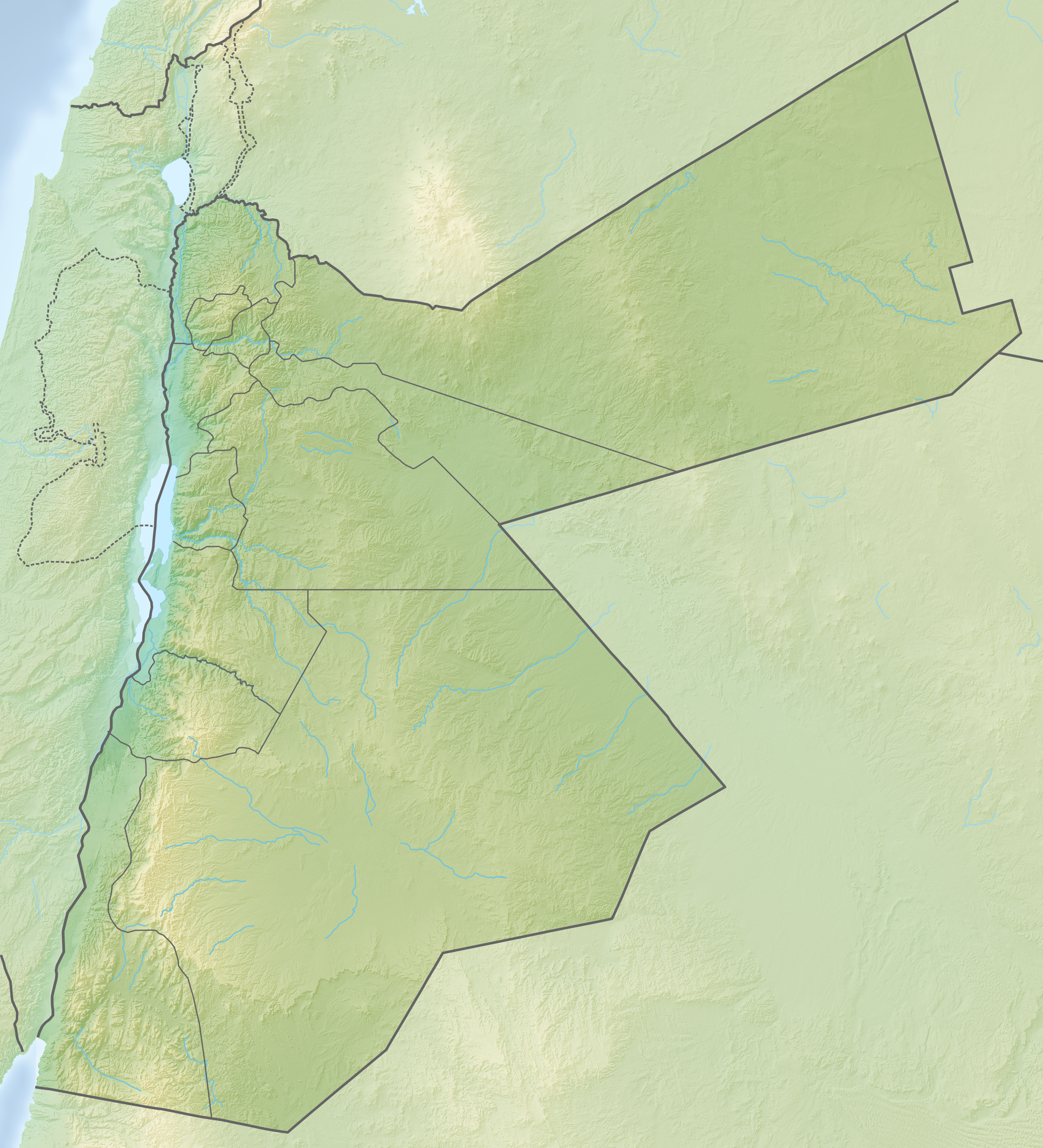
- Location within Jordan
- Coordinates: 31°33′59″N 35°38′9″E
- Palestine grid: 210/109
- Country: Jordan
- Governorate: Madaba Governorate
- Elevation: 730 m (2,400 ft)
- Area code: +(962)5

Mukawir (Arabic: مكاور, romanized: Mukawir) is a Jordanian town located in the Madaba Governorate approximately 50 kilometres (31 mi) south of the capital Amman.

The village is located 2 kilometres (1.2 mi) east from the ruins of Machaerus, a hilltop fortress overlooking the Dead Sea, where John the Baptist was beheaded around 32 AD.

Mukawir contains ruins of three 7th-century Byzantine churches, as well as several traditional houses from the early 20th century. In 2010, it had a population of around 400 people.

The village is witnessing increasing tourist numbers and cultural activities, including a performance of George Frideric Handel's oratorio Messiah in 2026.

== History ==
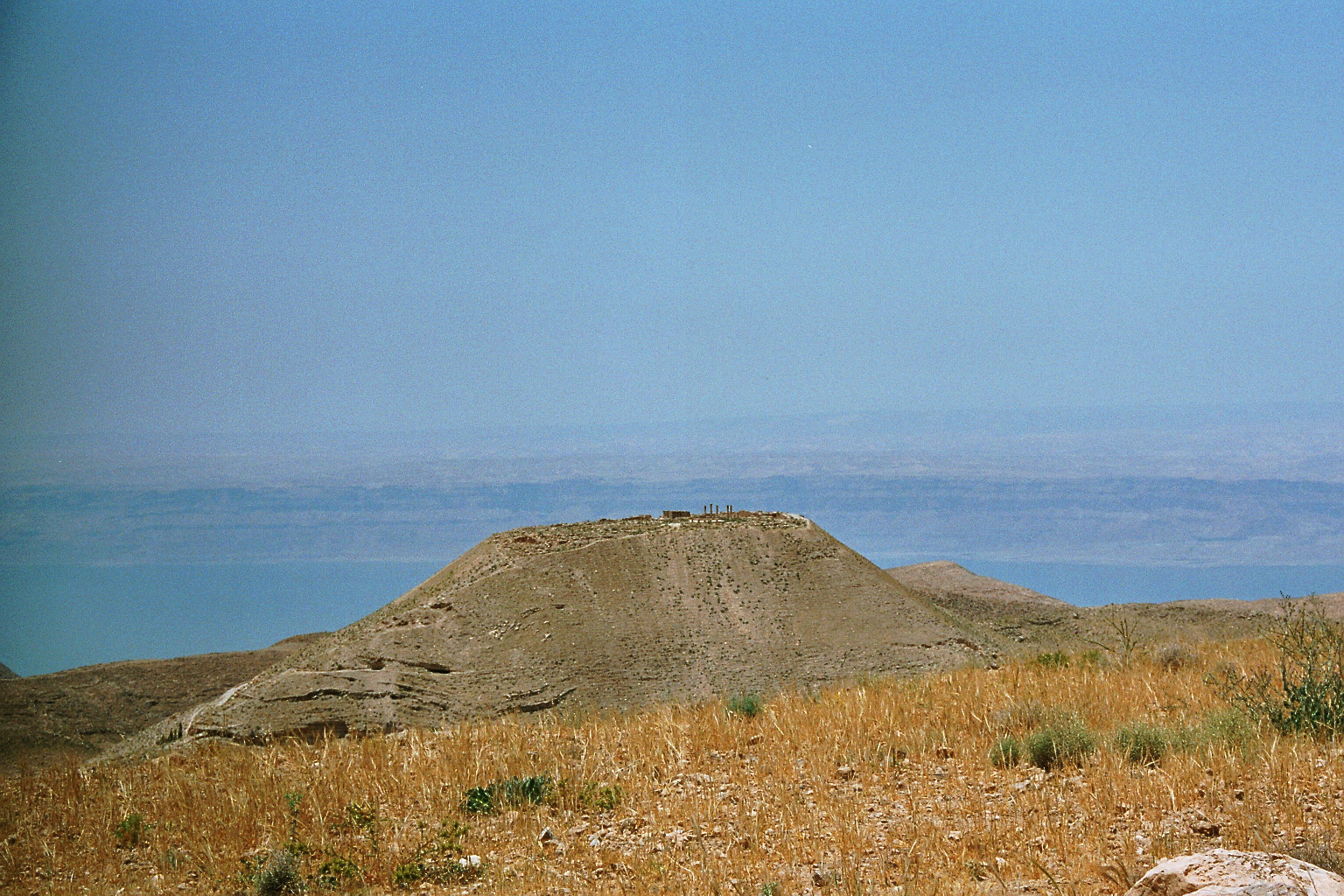
The ruins of the hilltop fortress of Machaerus as seen from the village of Mukawir with the Dead Sea in the background, 2007

Bedouin couple in their tent, either in Mukawir or the nearby Zerqa-Maeen area, 1930

Stone house either in Mukawir or the nearby Zerqa-Maeen area, 1930

The village is located two kilometers (about 1.25 miles) east from the ruins of the Hasmonean and Herodian fortress of Machaerus, which is on a hilltop overlooking the Dead Sea. The fortress was where John the Baptist was beheaded around 32 AD, after having criticized Herod Antipas' new marriage as adulterous.

The Jordanian Department of Antiquities conducted an excavation of a Byzantine church in Mukawir in 1965. This was followed by the Franciscan Biblical Institute, which began its excavations at the ruins in 1978. The institute excavated a second Byzantine church in 1989.

The modern village is inhabited by the Bani Hamida bedouin tribe. In 2010, it reportedly had around 400 inhabitants. It was visited and written about by the English scholar Henry Baker Tristram in 1872.

=== Bishop Malichius Church ===
The Church of Bishop Malichius is located south of the road passing through the modern village, east of the Western Church. The church is a three-aisled basilica measuring approximately 21.5 by 15 metres (71 ft × 49 ft), with remains of a mosaic floor. It likely dates to the first half of the 7th century AD.

The bishop after whom the church is named was previously unknown. He was associated with the episcopal see of Madaba. A Greek inscription in the northern aisle records the names of Sergius and George, described as "servants of Christ". Both individuals are also attested by inscriptions in other churches in the Madaba region.

=== The Northern Praying Hall ===
The church is situated on the northern slope of the hill occupied by the village. It is a small, single-aisled church or chapel measuring approximately 13.65 by 6 metres (44.8 ft × 19.7 ft). Its date of construction is unknown.

=== The Western Church ===
The ruins of a church stand on the western edge of the village, south of the road leading toward Machaerus, measuring approximately 20 by 19 metres (66 ft × 62 ft). Its mosaic floor was decorated with motifs of vines, trees, and birds. Some of the representations were later damaged during the period of Byzantine Iconoclasm. Although the site has been examined, no archaeological excavation of the church has been carried out. The investigations identified the remains as a basilica with three aisles. A mosaic band discovered within the church has been dated by Piccirillo in 1995 to 603 AD. Little visible evidence of the original church survives, making its architectural remains difficult to identify.

=== Heritage houses ===
Mukawir contains several houses from the 1940s, nine of which were acquired by the Jordanian government during the 1990s, restored, and classified as heritage houses showing the village's historic architecture. The houses generally consist of one or two rooms. Many families also continued to live in caves for extended periods, reflecting the pastoral character of the local community.

== Cultural activities ==
Performance of Handel's Messiah on 12 September 2026, by Jordanian and European artists, with Machaerus in the background

Machaerus lit up during sunset on the day of the performance

In the 2020s, the village of Mukawir has been witnessing increased numbers of tourists and activities.

In 2022, a Lebanese musical theatrical performance depicting the story behind the beheading of John the Baptist was staged in the village overlooking Machaerus.

=== Handel's Messiah ===
On 12 September 2026, more than 2,500 people attended a sunset performance of Handel's oratorio Messiah at Mukawir, with the fortress of Machaerus in the background. The performance featured the Hungarian State Opera orchestra and chorus, alongside soloists and musicians from Jordan and Europe. The event highlighted Mukawir's religious and historical significance and was presented as the beginning of a cultural and spiritual programme leading toward Jordan's commemorations of 2,000 years since Christ's baptism in 2030.
