= Ayn al-Zara =

Archaeological site in Jordan

- عين الزارة (Arabic)
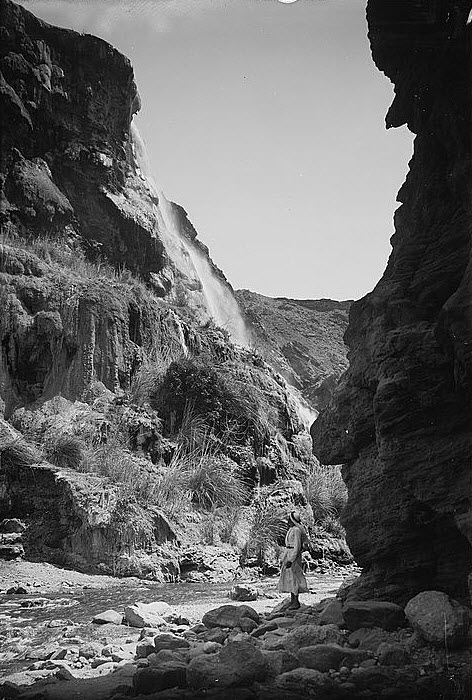

- Location within Jordan
- 31°35′49.2″N 35°33′33.5″E
- Type: nymphaeum thermae
- Region: Eastern shore of Dead Sea, Jordan

History
- Built: 1st century BCE

Ayn al-Zara (Arabic: عين الزارة, romanized: ʿAyn al-Zʾāra), known in ancient times as Callirrhoe (Ancient Greek: Θερμὰ Καλλιρόης, Thermà Kallirhoēs), is an archaeological site in Jordan. It includes the remains of a nymphaeum, though it is considered difficult to be interpreted. Callirrhoe is known in ancient literature for its thermal springs, because it was visited by King Herod according to Josephus shortly before his death in 4 BCE, as a final attempt to be cured or relieve his pains. It remains unknown if the "greatest builder in Jewish history" is related to any of the observable remains in the area. Callirrhoe is referred by Pliny the Elder (Natural History, 70-72), Ptolemaeus (Geography 15,6) and Solinus (De mirabilibus mundi 35,4) as well as in a Midrash.

== Names ==
The Greek name Kallirhoē means "beautiful brook" or "spring". The Arabic name Ayn az-Zara is sometimes derived from the root zar'a ("to sow"), in view of the agricultural function of the oasis. More probable is its derivation from an unattested original form al-Ayn az-Zahra ("the shining spring"), acting as a direct calque of the Greek.

== Madaba Map ==
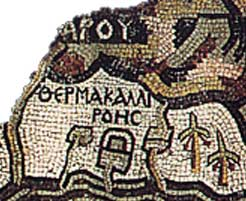
Callirrhoe hot springs, Madaba map

Callirrhoe is represented on Madaba Map. On the mosaic three constructions can be observed, a spring house, a nymphaeum, and a house. Springs' waters are gathered in basins, and two little palm trees are discerned representing the oasis or the fecundity of this area because of the abundant fresh water supply. Waters of the southern spring sprout from the mountain ending up in the sea.

According to Al-Tamimi, the physician, Callirrhoe (formerly called aḏ-Ḏara), was the source of the highly sought-after "salt of Sodom" (Arabic: milḥ anḏrānī), a crystalline salt that is white, shiny and sticky.

== Archaeological surveys ==
Callirrhoe is identified as the present day oasis 'Ein ez-Zara, laying on the eastern shore of Dead Sea south of Wadi Zerka Ma'in in Jordan. It was founded circa 1st century BCE and excavations between 1985 and 1989 were directed by August Strobel on behalf of the German Evangelical Institute for the Ancient Holy Land. A villa of the 1st century CE, uncovered in recent excavations, is considered to be inspired by the designs used by Herod for his palaces. Callirrhoe functioned as harbor site for the mountain fortress of Machaerus. An ancient road of 8 km length connects the two sites.

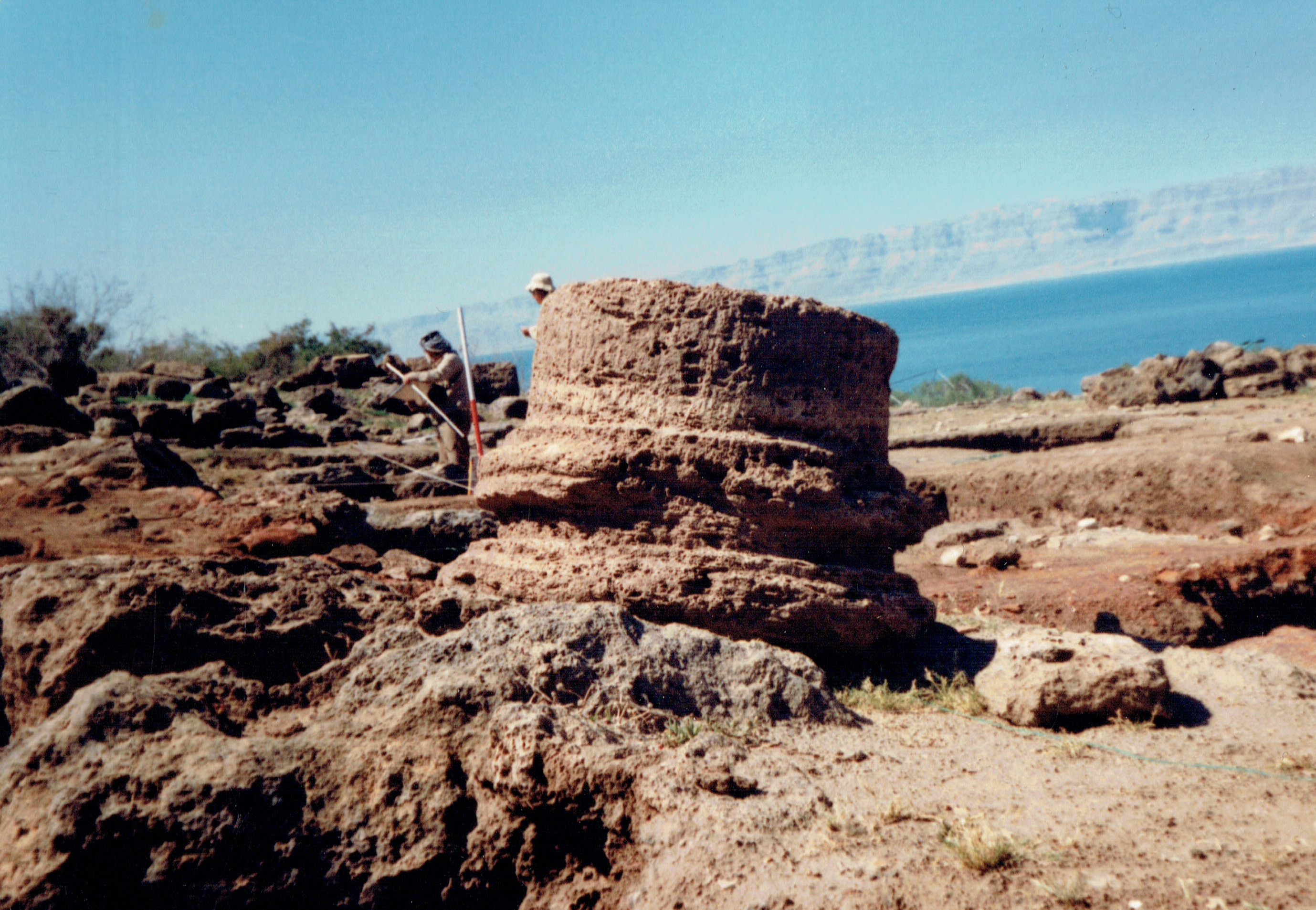
Ionic style column basis at the Herodian palace site of Callirrhoe/Jordan
