= Nabataean coinage =

Currency of the Nabatean Kingdom

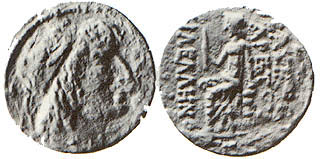
Aretas III 85 BC

The coinage of Nabataea began under the reign of Aretas II, c. 110 – 96 BC but it was his heir Aretas III, who at the time was in control of land extending to Damascus. The silver coinage is based on the weight of the Roman Denarius or Greek Drachma, as the adjacent areas around Nabataea used the Greek weight system, it is presumed the coins are of this standard. The local name of the denominations are not known so the Latin denarius and Greek drachma equivalents are used interchangeably.

Some authors state it to be based on the Phoenician drachmae instead on the Attic drachmae weight standard. Most common is the small bronze coinage of between 5–25 mm in diameter, which was in use at the same time as the coins of Judaea. The name of these coins is unknown but they do correspond with the common bronze coins issued at the time in the Greek area of influence.

== Silver ==
With a weight of roughly 4.5 grams the coins were issued by most of the kings, with the king and his wife on the obverse and either king or female figure on the reverse. Denominations come in 1 Denarius/Drachmae and a quarter of the unit at a weight of 1 gram on average.

Some examples of coins are:

- Meshorer 96, 4.555g, 15.0mm, 0o, Petra mint, 19 - 20 A.D.
- Meshorer 103, aVF, usual flat strike, 3.88g, 14.3mm, 0o, Petra mint, 25 - 26 A.D.

== Lead ==
Lead coins were issued with the king on one side and a bull or with a God (Nike?) on the other and sometimes the kings image replaced with a god (Zeus?)

== Bronze and Copper ==
Usually depicting the king with or without his wife on the obverse and a crossed cornucopia on the reverse. Aretas usually wore a laureate and faced right, a veiled Queen Shuqailat behind him.
