= Nabataean language =

Nabataean language may refer to:

- Nabataean Aramaic, a Western Aramaic variety that was the written language of the Nabataean kingdom
- Nabataean Arabic, the dialect of Arabic spoken by the Nabataeans
- Eastern Aramaic varieties that were referred to by the Muslim Arabs as "Nabataean"
