= Bani Mahdi =

Bani Mahdi بني مهدي
- Sub-district
- Location in Yemen
- Coordinates: 14°18′15″N 43°59′49″E
- Country: Yemen
- Governorate: Ibb Governorate
- District: Al Qafr District

Population (2004)
  - Total: 2,847
- Time zone: UTC+3

Bani Mahdi (Arabic: بني مهدي) is a sub-district located in Al Qafr District, Ibb Governorate, Yemen. Bani Mahdi had a population of 2847 as of 2004.
