= Münsterstraße station =

Railway station in Dortmund, Germany

Coordinates: 51.5261°N 7.4602°E

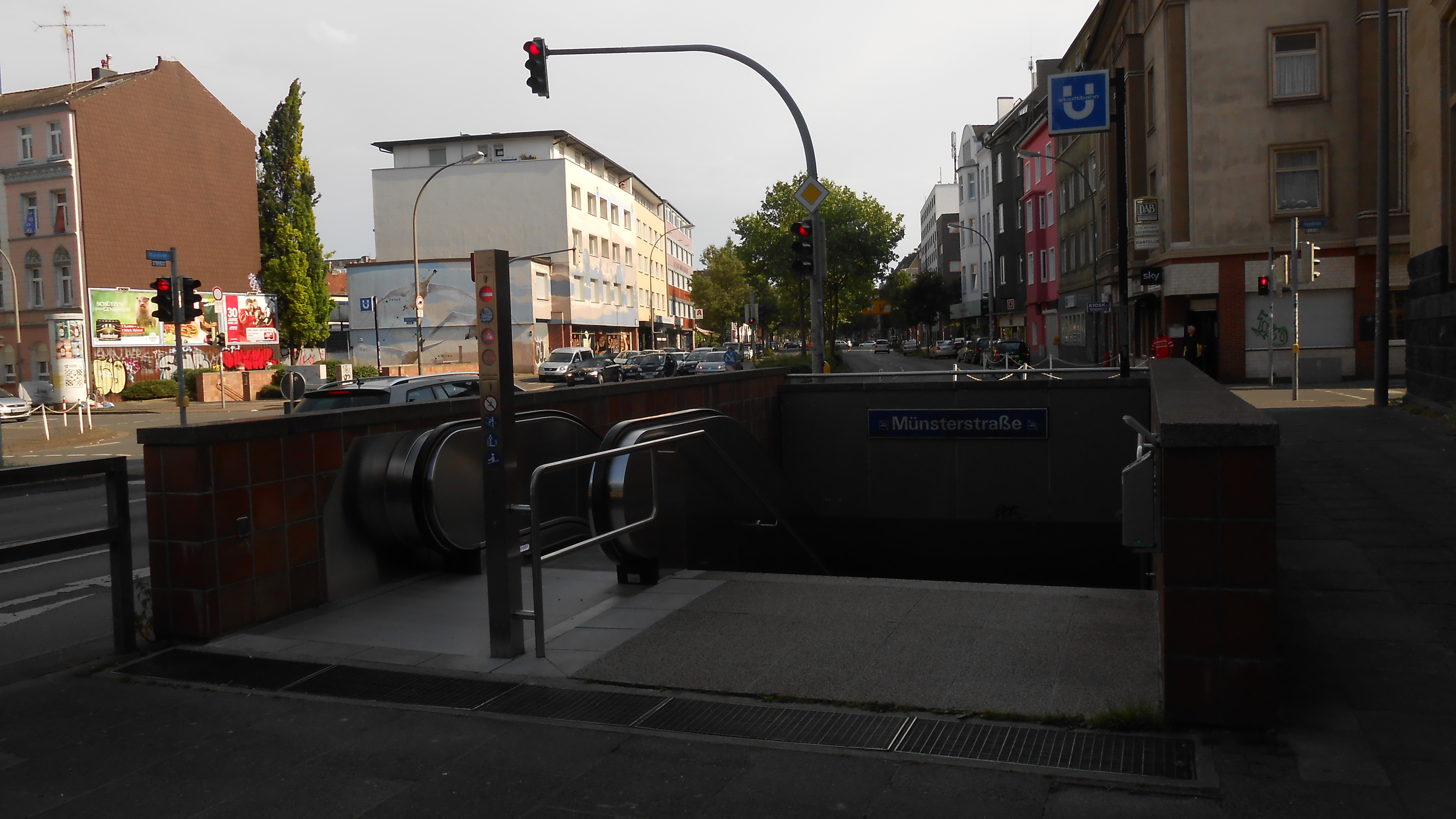
Entrance of Münsterstraße station

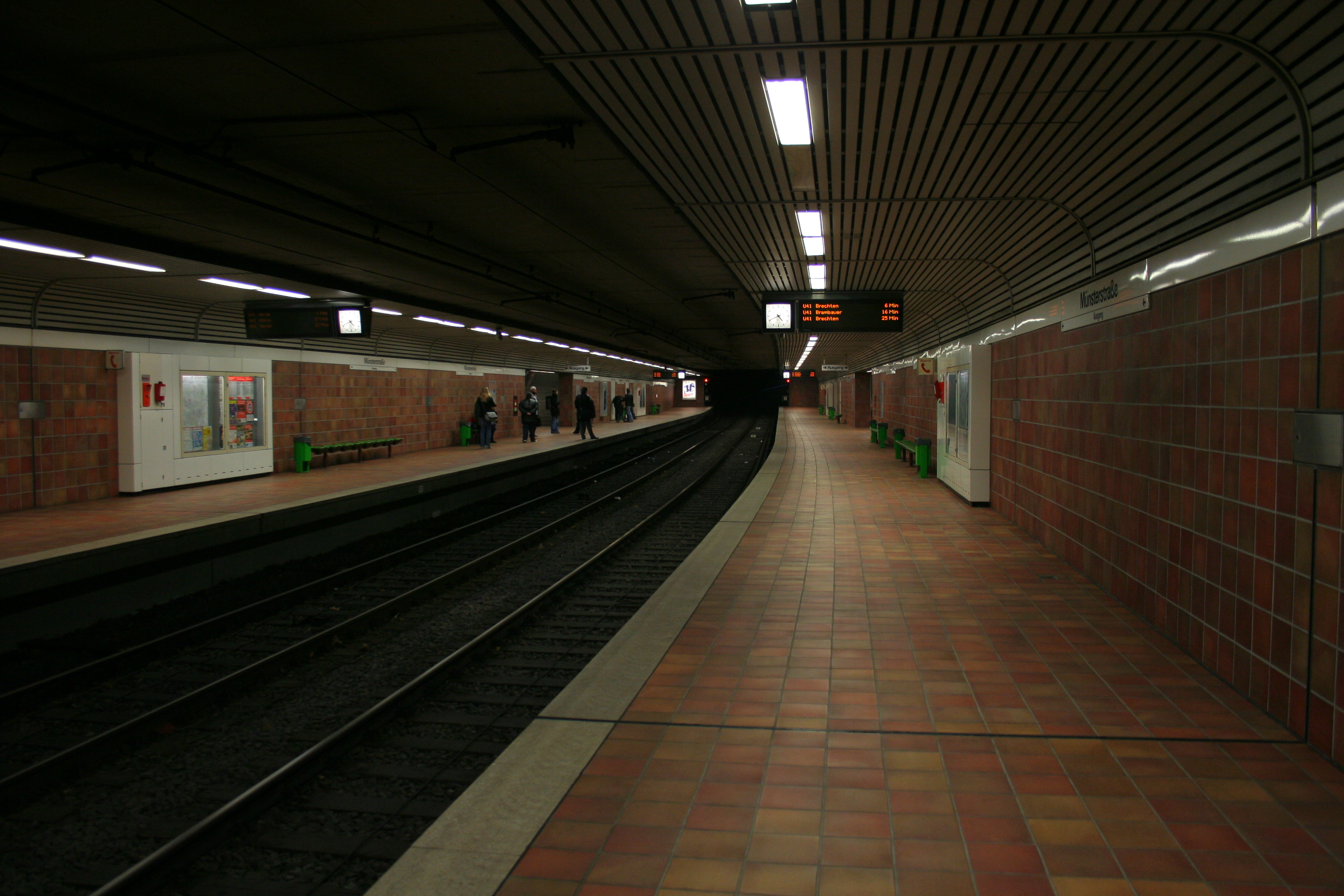
Platform level

Münsterstraße is an underground station of the Dortmund Stadtbahn. It is situated below the crossroads of Münsterstraße and Haydnstraße in Dortmund, Germany. The line U41 serves the station.

== History ==
The tram line to Brambauer originally opened on 14 December 1904. The modern tunnel station went into operation in June 1984 as part of the Inner City Tunnel (Innenstadttunnel) of the Stammstrecke 1, when line 401 became the U41. It is the northernmost tunnel station of the line, which returns above ground between Münsterstraße and Lortzingstraße station.

== Services ==
The station is served every 10 minutes during rush hours, and every 20 minutes during off-peak hours.

Preceding station	Rhine-Ruhr Stadtbahn	Following station
Lortzingstraße towards Brambauer Verkehrshof	U41	Leopoldstraße towards Clarenberg
