= Unexploded ordnance =

Explosives that have not fully detonated

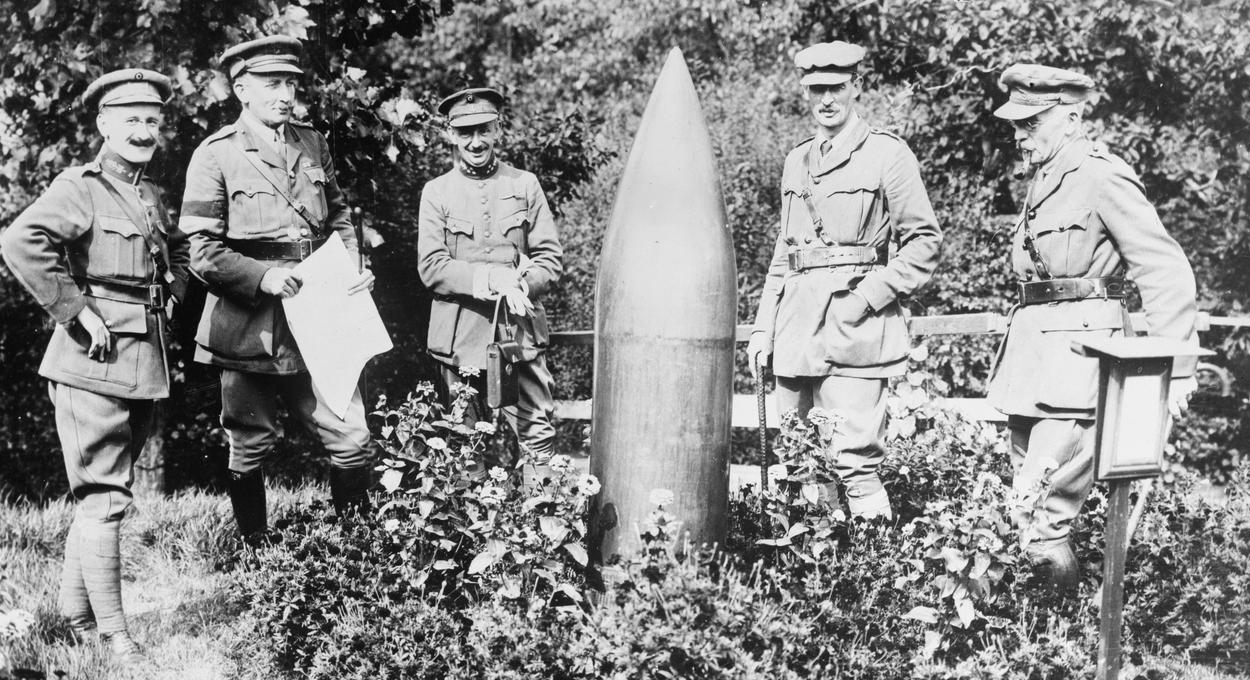
British and Belgian officers stand beside an unexploded German shell in Flanders, during World War I.

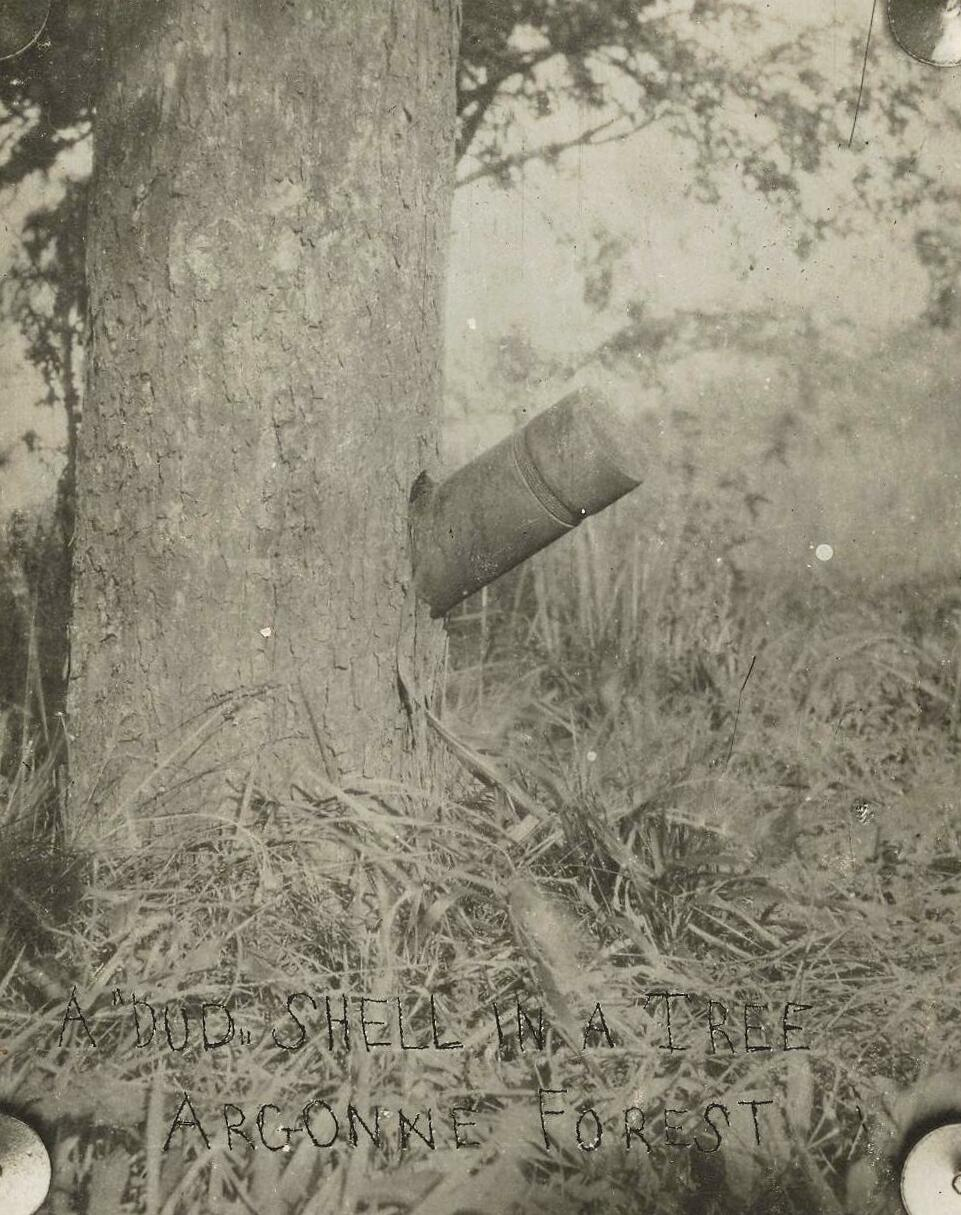
Dud shell lodged in a tree, Argonne Forest, World War I

Unexploded ordnance (UXO, sometimes abbreviated as UO) and unexploded bombs (UXBs) are explosive weapons (bombs, shells, grenades, land mines, naval mines, cluster munition, and other munitions) that did not explode when they were deployed and remain at risk for detonation, sometimes many decades after they were used or discarded. When unwanted munitions are found, they are sometimes destroyed in controlled explosions, but accidental detonation of even very old explosives might also occur, sometimes with fatal consequences.

For example, UXO from World War I continues to be a hazard, with poisonous gas filled munitions still a problem. UXO does not always originate from conflict; areas such as military training bases can also hold significant numbers, even after the area has been abandoned.

Seventy-eight countries are contaminated by land mines, which kill or maim 15,000–20,000 people every year. Approximately 80% of casualties are civilian, with children being the most affected age group. An average estimate of 50% of deaths occur within hours of the blast. In recent years, mines have been used increasingly as weapons of terror; especially against local populations, such as in the Syrian civil war.

In addition to the obvious danger of explosion, buried UXO can cause environmental contamination. In some heavily used military training areas, munitions-related chemicals such as explosives and perchlorate (a component of pyrotechnics and rocket fuel) may enter soil and groundwater, thereby contaminating the water supply, preventing agrarian uses such as farming.

== Risks and problems ==
Unexploded ordnance, no matter how old, may explode. It might seem that the dangers of UXO decrease over time, but this is not always the case. Corrosion and damages sustained on impact pose significant difficulties to defuse UXO safely. In munitions containing double-base compositions, mixed compounds may separate or shift over time, leading to the release of volatile contact explosives such as nitroglycerin into spots in the casing or leaking outside into the surrounding area. Sometimes components of the original explosives, in the presence of moisture, can form new explosive compounds with the metals in the shells like picrates that can leave a shell highly explosive, even when it is defused and the detonator destroyed or removed.

Even if unexploded ordnance does not explode, environmental pollutants are released as it degrades. The toxic compounds and heavy metals can contaminate water and soil over time. Recovery, particularly of deeply-buried projectiles, is difficult and hazardous—jarring may detonate the charge. Once uncovered, UXO is often destroyed in place, frequently requiring the evacuation of surrounding areas. If on-site detonation poses too great a hazard to nearby infrastructure, munitions deemed safe to move can be transported to a controlled site for disposal.

Unexploded ordnance dating as far back as the mid-19th century still poses a hazard worldwide, both in current and former combat areas and at military firing ranges. A major problem with unexploded ordnance is that over the years, the detonator and main charge deteriorate to such an extent that they frequently become more sensitive to disturbance and therefore more dangerous to handle. Construction works may disturb unsuspected unexploded bombs, which may then explode. Forest fires may be aggravated if buried ordnance explodes. Heat waves, causing the water level to drop severely, may increase the danger of immersed ordnance. There are countless examples of people tampering with unexploded ordnance that is many years old, often with fatal results. For this reason, it is universally recommended that unexploded ordnance should not be touched or handled by unqualified persons. Instead, the location should be reported to the local police so that bomb disposal or Explosive Ordnance Disposal (EOD) professionals can render it safe.

Although professional EOD personnel have expert knowledge, skills and equipment, they are not immune to misfortune because of the inherent dangers: in June 2010, construction workers in Göttingen, Germany discovered an Allied 500-kilogram (1,100 lb) bomb dating from World War II buried approximately 7 metres (23 ft) below the ground. German EOD experts were notified and attended the scene. Whilst residents living nearby were being evacuated and the EOD personnel were preparing to disarm the bomb, it detonated, killing three of them and severely injuring six others. The dead and injured each had over 20 years of hands-on experience, and had previously rendered safe between 600 and 700 unexploded bombs. The bomb which killed and injured the EOD personnel was of a particularly dangerous type because it was fitted with a delayed-action chemical fuze (with an integral anti-handling device) which had not operated as designed, but had become highly unstable after over 65 years underground. The type of delayed-action fuze in the Göttingen bomb was commonly used: a glass vial containing acetone was smashed after the bomb was released; the acetone was intended, as it dripped downwards, to disintegrate celluloid discs holding back a spring-loaded trigger that would strike a detonator when the discs degraded sufficiently after some minutes or hours. These bombs, when striking soft earth at an angle, often end their trajectory not pointing downwards, so that the acetone did not drip onto and weaken the celluloid; but over many years the discs degraded until the trigger was released and the bomb detonated spontaneously, or when weakened by being jarred.

In November 2013, four US Marines were killed by an explosion whilst clearing unexploded ordnance from a firing range at Camp Pendleton. The exact cause is not known, although the Marines had been handing grenades they were collecting to each other, a practice permitted but discouraged. It is thought that a grenade may have exploded after being kicked or bumped, setting off hundreds of other grenades and shells.

A dramatic example of munitions and explosives of concern (MEC) threat is the wreck of the SS Richard Montgomery, which was sunk in shallow water about 2.4 kilometres (1.5 miles) from the town of Sheerness and 8.0 kilometres (5 miles) from Southend. The wreckage still contains 1,400 tons of explosives. In comparison with the World War II wreck of the SS Kielce which rests at a higher depth, with a smaller load of explosives, it still exploded after a salvaging operation in 1967 and produced a tremor measuring 4.5 on the Richter scale.

== Around the world ==
=== Africa ===
A man holding an unexploded mortar shell during a United Nations Mine Action Service demonstration in Mogadishu

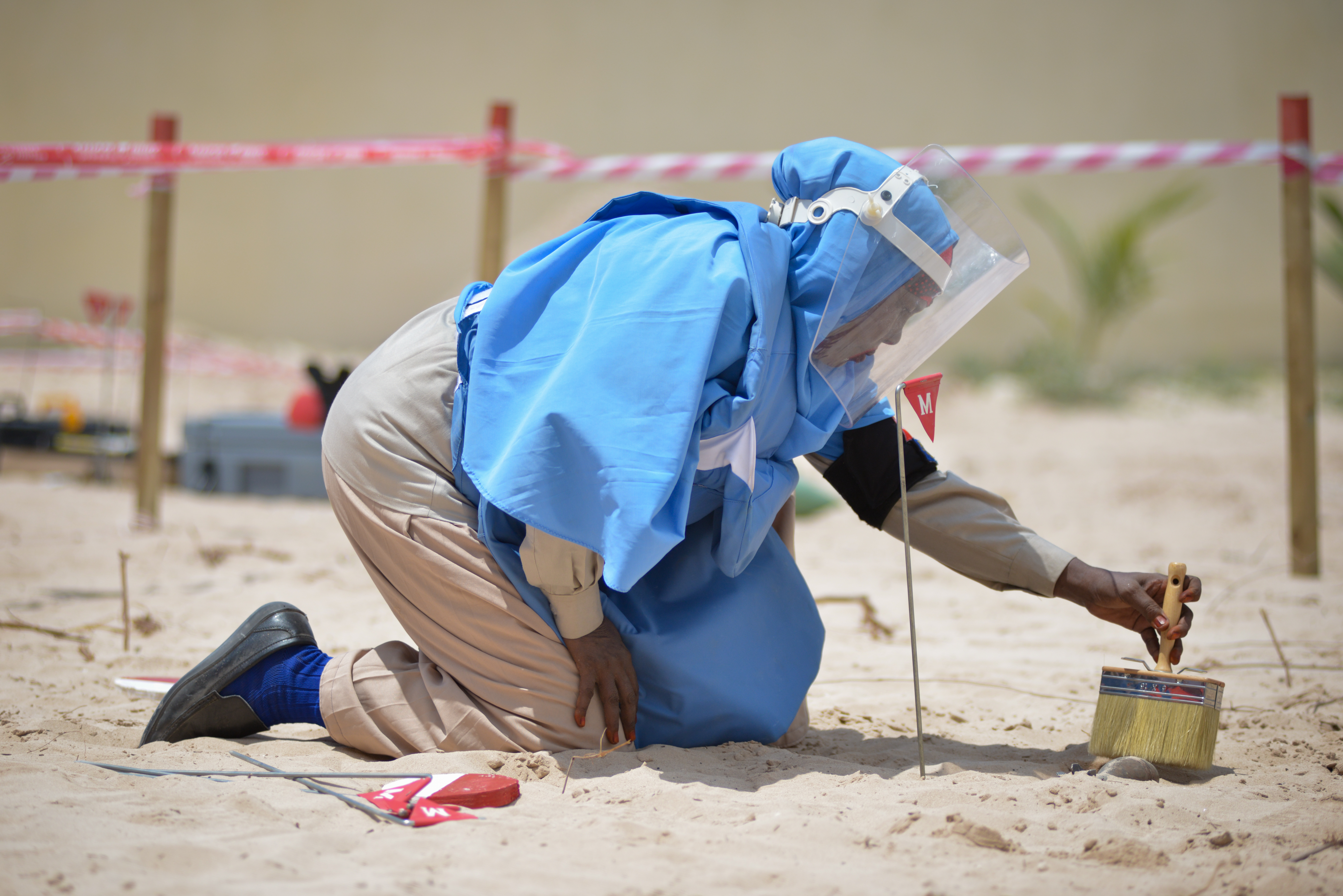
An EOD technician removing sand from a mortar shell during a demonstration

==== Effects of the North African campaign of World War II ====
During the fighting in North Africa between the Axis and Allied forces, much of North Africa was heavily mined to prevent military advances. During the conflict, in addition to the millions of mines that were placed, some of the millions of shells which were fired did not explode, and remain deadly to this day. Algeria, Egypt, Libya and Tunisia are all affected by this issue, with civilians being injured and killed every year. UXO also slows progress, with areas having to be demined before being developed.

==== Algeria ====
Algeria has been contaminated with large numbers of mines and UXO throughout several wars, starting from World War II. During the Algerian war for independence, French forces laid up to 10 million mines on the Morice and Challe lines, on the eastern and western sides of the country. In 2007, France officially handed over maps to Algerian authorities showing the locations of minefields. The lack of these maps had previously severely hampered Algerian demining efforts.

Further mines were laid in the Algerian civil war by both warring parties, requiring further demining efforts. However, these mining operations were not on nearly as large a scale as French operations.

By July 2016, Algeria reported that it had cleared all major minefields it had identified to clear. Thereafter, Algeria called on French authorities to provide compensation to the families of the 4000 people who are estimated to have been killed by mines, and thousands who have been left disabled from French ordnance.

==== Chad ====
Chad has been dealing with contamination issues stemming from its numerous conflicts between the 1960s and the 1980s. A significant portion of this contamination comes from the presence of anti-personnel mines, many of which are believed to have originated from Libyan sources during that period. As of 2020, estimates provided by the Mine Action Review indicated that approximately 10 square kilometers (or 3.9 square miles) of Chadian territory remained contaminated with these dangerous antipersonnel mines. Additionally, a smaller portion of UXO related to cluster munitions continues to affect some regions in the northern part of the country.

In recent years, the ongoing jihadist insurgency led by Boko Haram has further complicated the situation. According to the Chadian government, Boko Haram and similar insurgent groups are likely responsible for laying additional mines. These groups are also known for scavenging explosives from pre-existing UXO in order to manufacture improvised explosive devices (IEDs), making the clearance of these remnants of war even more critical for national security. Effective mine clearance and UXO removal are essential not only to reduce the threat of accidental detonation, but also to limit the availability of materials that insurgents might use for their attacks.

==== Egypt ====
Egypt is the most heavily mined country in the world (by number) with as many as 22.7 million mines as of 2024. It is estimated that 22% of Egypt's territory is mined. These mines are from both World War II and wars that Egypt has fought with Israel. Mines contaminate large amounts of agricultural land, slowing development efforts. De-mining is a priority in the country to open up more land for agriculture purposes, oil drilling and mining. Nevertheless, Egypt stresses its need to deploy mines in order to protect its borders.

==== Ethiopia ====
Ethiopia was heavily mined in World War II, the Eritrean War of Independence, the Eritrean-Ethiopian War, and the Tigray War. The most heavily affected regions are Afar, Somali, and Tigray regions which have seen repeated conflict. A study in 2004 found that landmines and UXO affected an estimated 1.5 million people. Between 2000 and 2004, they caused 588 fatalities and 1,300 injuries.

==== Libya ====
Libya was first contaminated with UXO in World War II, in areas such as Tobruk, where heavy fighting took place. The contamination from World War II is largely unexploded ordnance and anti vehicle mines.

Libya was contaminated during its wars with Egypt and Chad, and it is also believed that the border with Tunisia is contaminated. While Muammar Gaddafi was in power in Libya, mines were placed around military facilities and other key infrastructure.

In the first Libyan civil war that began in 2011, both government and opposition forces used mines. According to the Libyan mine action centre, 30–35,000 mines were laid; however, these were largely cleared after the downfall of the Gaddafi regime by ex-soldiers. With the downfall of the Gaddafi regime, in March 2011 large ammunition depots were left unattended, and easily accessible by the civilian population, as well as soldiers and paramilitary forces. The government did not regain control of these depots, and munitions from the same depots were spread across the country. Several of the stores also exploded, spreading dangerous ordnance over a wide area. Many military vehicles were also destroyed in fighting all across the country, and these often contained ordnance in an unstable condition.

With hostilities breaking out again in 2014, there were reports of both landmines and IEDs being laid by opposition groups, particularly in urban areas. This complicated clearance operations as these areas are often densely populated.

In 2019, clashes between the Libyan National Army (LNA) and government forces around Tripoli escalated, with the LNA surrounding Tripoli in January 2020 and launching constant rocket and artillery attacks. Both sides were also reported to be using weapons indiscriminately against international law and endangering civilian lives. Weapons such as drones from Turkey and China were used, violating the UN arms embargo placed on Libya. When the LNA forces withdrew from the east of Tripoli in June 2021, they left behind an unspecified amount of IEDs. It was reported by the UN mine action service that booby traps were left in civilian homes with their only purpose being to cause civilian casualties. In January 2020, the UN estimated that Libya was contaminated by up to 20 million mines and pieces of UXO.

The Russian paramilitary organisation Wagner which was operating in the area, also reportedly left munitions and mines in southern Tripoli. Human Rights Watch said that the Wagner Group and other militias left behind "enormous" amounts of ordnance. In August 2021, the BBC reported receiving an electronic tablet containing information on Wagner operators' role in laying mines. Deminers in Tripoli reported finding documents in Russian in rooms that they were demining. On 24 May 2022, the Human Rights Watch wrote to the Russian foreign minister, asking to review their findings connecting with the Wagner group operations in laying mines in Tripoli, and clarify on the group's role in the conflict. The Russian authorities did not respond.

==== Mali ====
Major contamination of Mali with UXO stems from the resurgence of conflict in 2012 Mali. Mines and IEDs were laid more heavily in the north of the country. The situation deteriorated in 2019; however, the extent of the contamination is unknown, as there has been no clear mapping of the country's minefields.

==== Mauritania ====
Mine and UXO contamination stems from Mauritania's 1976–1978 war in the Western Sahara, while fighting against the Polisario front over the region. UXO is largely concentrated in the north of the country, around urban centres, where heavy fighting took place.

Following the urbanisation of 70% of the country's nomadic population, urban expansion has strayed into mine belts. As many of these nomads still follow pastoral practises, valuable livestock and people can stray into contact with mines. Despite this, people are unwilling to move due to the fact that Northern Mauritania is known as the best place to raise camels. It is also difficult to precisely mark mines, due to the fact that dunes can rapidly change their location.

Although the country was declared mine free in 2018, Mauritania reported the discovery of previously unknown mined areas. As of 2023, an estimated 11.52 square kilometres (4.45 sq mi) of Mauritania was contaminated with mines.

==== Morocco ====
The contamination of Moroccan territory is a consequence of the conflict between the Royal Moroccan Army and the Polisario Front over the Western Sahara. The majority of the contamination is confined to the area around the Moroccan Western Sahara wall. All along the length of the wall (on the Eastern side) runs a minefield, sometimes claimed to be the world's longest continual minefield. During the 1975–1991 conflict, the Moroccan army used cluster munitions, and unexploded bomblets still kill and maim uneducated citizens to this day.

Prior to the resumption of hostilities in November 2020, both the UN and the Moroccan army claimed to have destroyed tens of thousands of land mines, and cleared hundreds of square kilometres of land.

==== Niger ====
In 2018 Niger reported a known contaminated area near Madama military base, totalling just over 0.2 square kilometres (0.077 sq mi). Clearance of approximately 18,000 square metres (190,000 sq ft) took place up to March 2020, however no clearance is thought to have taken place since then. In 2023, Niger reported that there were just under 0.2 km^{2} of contaminated areas near the Madama military base.

The spread of conflicts in the Lake Chad and Liptako-Gourma regions has contributed new UXO to the regions, with some insurgencies spreading to Niger. IEDs have seen increased use, some victim activated and some indiscriminate. Many of the mines used by insurgencies such as Boko Haram are used to target military convoys and vehicles, however inevitably there are civilian casualties. Between 2016 and the end of 2022, the National Commission for the Collection and Control of Illicit weapons reported 183 explosive ordnance incidents, killing 203 and wounding 204. 80% of the incidents occurred in the Tillabéri and Diffa regions.

==== Sudan ====
Sudan's mine contamination largely stems from its civil war and other wars since the country's independence from Britain. In 2005, a peace agreement between the rebel forces (mainly the Sudan People's Liberation Movement) and the government brought an end to fighting, and along with it mine laying. In 2009, the UN Mine Action Service (UNMAS) reported that across 16 Sudanese states, contamination totalled 107 square kilometres (41 sq mi). Despite conflict breaking out in 2011, by early 2023 it was reported that only just over 13 km^{2} (5.0 sq mi) of Sudanese land was contaminated with mines, and slightly more contaminated with UXO.

In April 2023, heavy fighting broke out between the Sudanese Armed Forces (SAF), and the Rapid Support Forces, (RSF), a paramilitary organisation. The SAF alleges that the RSF has laid mines, but as of April 2024 no evidence has emerged to support that claim.

=== Americas ===
==== Canada ====
After World War II, much unused ordnance in Canada was dumped along the country's eastern and western coasts at sites selected by the Canadian military. Other UXO in Canada is found on sites used by the Canadian military for operations, training and weapons tests, such as the former Tracadie Range, in Tracadie-Sheila, New Brunswick. These sites are labeled under the "legacy sites" program created in 2005 to identify areas and quantify risk due to UXO. As of 2019, the Department of National Defence has confirmed 62 locations as legacy sites, with a further 774 sites in assessment. There has been controversy because some lands appropriated by the military during World War II were owned by First Nations, such as 8 square kilometres (2,000 acres) that make up Camp Ipperwash in Ontario, which was given with the understanding that the land would be given back at the end of the war. These lands have required and still need extensive clean-up efforts due to the possible presence of UXO.

==== Colombia ====
During the long Colombian conflict that began around 1964, a large number of landmines were deployed in rural areas across Colombia. The landmines are homemade and were placed primarily during the last 25 years of the conflict, hindering rural development significantly. The rebel groups of Revolutionary Armed Forces of Colombia (FARC) and the smaller ELN are usually blamed for having placed the mines. All departments of Colombia are affected, but Antioquia, where the city of Medellín is located, holds the largest amounts. After Afghanistan, Colombia has the second-highest number of landmine casualties, with more than 11,500 people killed or injured by landmines since 1990, according to Colombian government figures.

In September 2012, the Colombian peace process began officially in Havana and in August 2016, the US and Norway initiated an international five-year demining program, now supported by another 24 countries and the European Union. Both the Colombian military and FARC are taking part in the demining efforts. The program intends to rid Colombia of landmines and other UXO by 2021 and it has been funded with nearly US$112 million, including US$33 million from the US (as part of the larger US foreign policy Plan Colombia) and US$20 million from Norway. Experts however, have estimated that it will take at least a decade due to the difficult terrain.

==== United States ====
Unlike many countries in Europe and Asia, the United States has never been subjected to significant aerial bombardment. Nevertheless, according to the Department of Defense, "millions of acres" of US territory may contain UXO, discarded military munitions (DMM) and munitions constituents (e.g., explosive compounds).

According to United States Environmental Protection Agency documents released in late 2002, UXO at 16,000 domestic inactive military ranges within the United States pose an "imminent and substantial" public health risk and could require the largest environmental cleanup ever, at a cost of at least US$14 billion. Some individual ranges cover 1,300 square kilometres (500 sq mi), and, taken together, the ranges comprise an area the size of Florida.

UXO cleanup in the US involves over 40,000 square kilometres (10 million acres) of land and 1,400 different sites. Estimated cleanup costs are tens of billions of dollars. It costs roughly $1,000 to demolish a UXO on site. Other costs include surveying and mapping, removing vegetation from the site, transportation, and personnel to manually detect UXOs with metal detectors. Searching for UXOs is tedious work and often 100 holes are dug to every 1 UXO found. Other methods of finding UXOs include digital geophysics detection with land and airborne systems.

On Joint Base Cape Cod (JBCC) on Cape Cod, Massachusetts, decades of artillery training contaminated the only drinking water for thousands of surrounding residents. A costly UXO recovery effort is under way. UXO on US military bases has caused problems for transferring and restoring Base Realignment and Closure (BRAC) land. The Environmental Protection Agency's efforts to commercialize former munitions testing grounds are complicated by UXO, making investments and development risky.

In 1917, in response to other nations' extensive use of chemical weapons in World War I, the US Army Chemical Warfare Service (CWS) opened a weapons research laboratory and production facility at American University in Washington, D.C. CWS troops at the station routinely fired incendiary and chemical projectiles into a nearby undeveloped area. When the station was deactivated after the war in 1919, UXO in the firing range was left abandoned, and unused projectiles and toxic chemicals were buried in deep, poorly mapped pits. Collegiate athletic fields, businesses and homes were subsequently built in the area. Chemical UXO continues to be periodically found on and near campus, and in 2001, the USACE began cleanup efforts after arsenic was found in soil at the athletic fields. In 2017, the USACE was cautiously excavating a university-owned property in an adjacent neighborhood where investigators believed that a large unmapped cache of mustard gas projectiles was buried.

Although comparatively rare, unexploded ordnance from the American Civil War is still occasionally found and is still deadly over 150 years later. Union and Confederate troops fired an estimated 1.5 million artillery shells at each other from 1861 to 1865. As many as one in five did not explode. In 1973, during the restoration of Weston Manor, an 18th-century plantation house in Hopewell, Virginia, that was shelled by Union gunboats during the Civil War, a live shell was found embedded in the dining room ceiling. The ball was disarmed and is shown to visitors to the plantation. In late March 2008, a 20-kilogram (44 lb), 20-centimetre (8 in) mortar shell was uncovered at the Petersburg National Battlefield, the site of a 292-day siege. The shell was taken to the city landfill where it was safely detonated by ordnance disposal experts. Also in 2008, a Civil War enthusiast was killed in the explosion of a 23-centimetre (9 in), 34-kilogram (75 lb) naval shell he was attempting to disarm in the driveway of his home near Richmond, Virginia. The explosion sent a chunk of shrapnel crashing into a house four hundred metres (1/4 mi) away. The area around Fort St. Philip, Louisiana is also covered in UXO from Civil War era naval bombardment, and caution must be taken when visiting the ruins.

In December 2007, UXO was discovered in new development areas outside Orlando, Florida, and construction had to be halted. According to Alaska State Troopers, an unexploded aerial bomb was safely detonated by Fort Wainwright soldiers on 19 September 2019.

Multiple parts of Hawaii, such as Mākua Valley and the island of Kahoʻolawe, have been used as firing and bombing ranges, and have been the subject of legal disputes regarding UXO cleanup and environmental restoration.

=== Asia ===
==== Japan ====
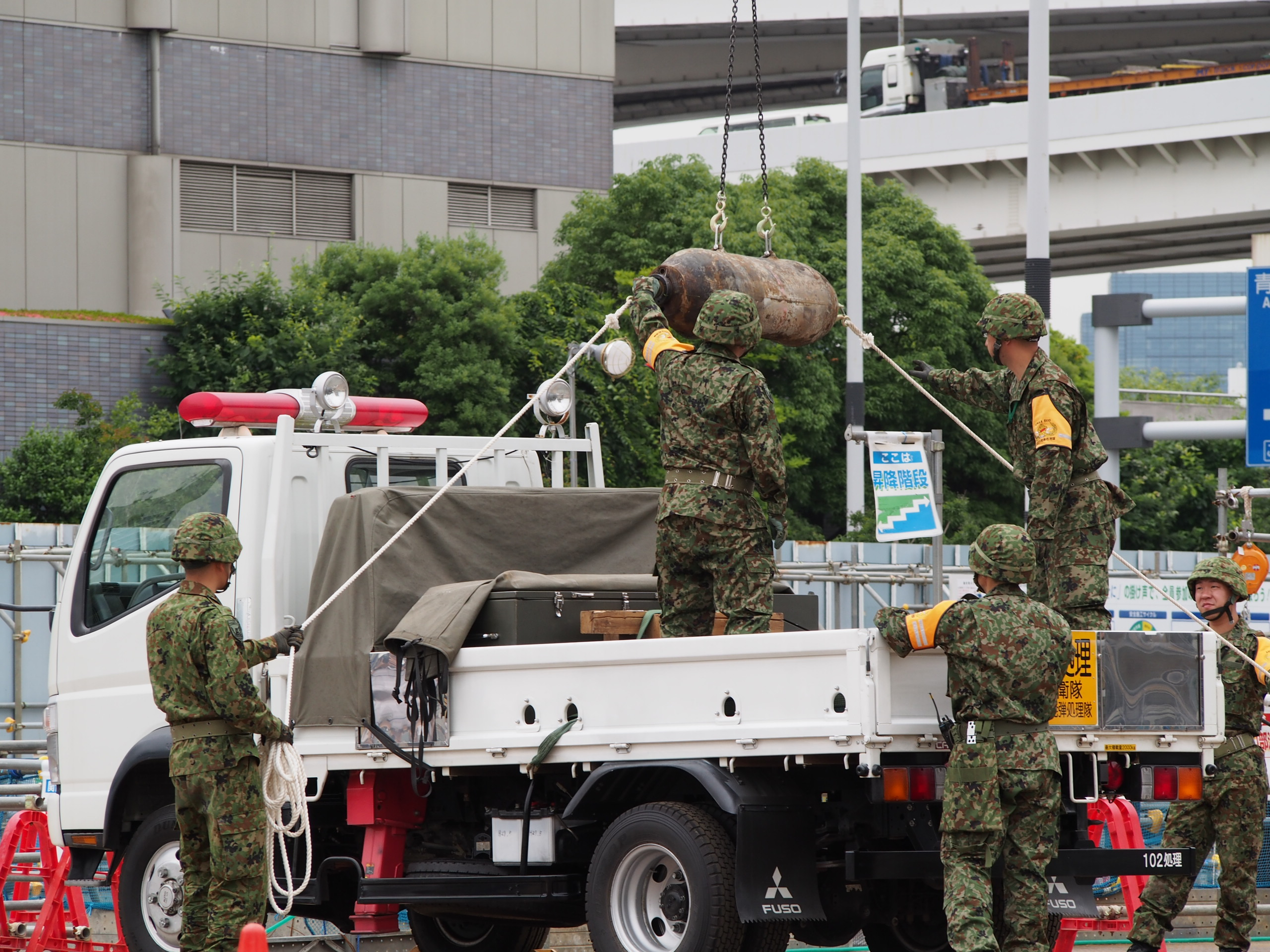
An unexploded bomb from World War II being loaded onto a truck in Tokyo after defusal in 2019

Thousands of tons of UXO remains buried across Japan, particularly in Okinawa, where over 200,000 tons of ordnance were dropped during the final year of World War II. From 1945 until the end of the U.S. occupation of the island in 1972, the Japan Self-Defense Forces (JSDF) and the US military disposed of 5,500 tons of UXO. Over 30,000 UXO disposal operations have been conducted on Okinawa by the JSDF since 1972, and it is estimated it could take close to a century to dispose of the remaining unexploded munitions on the islands. No injuries or deaths have been reported as a result of UXO disposal, however. Tokyo and other major cities, including Kobe, Yokohama and Fukuoka, were targeted by several massive air raids during World War II, which left behind large amounts of UXO. Shells from Imperial Army and Imperial Navy guns also continue to be discovered.

On 29 October 2012, an unexploded 250-kilogram (550 lb) US bomb with a functioning detonator was discovered near a runway at Sendai Airport during reconstruction following the 2011 Tōhoku earthquake and tsunami, resulting in the airport being closed and all flights cancelled. The airport reopened the next day after the bomb was safely contained, but closed again on 14 November while the bomb was defused and safely removed.

In March 2013, an unexploded Imperial Army anti-aircraft shell measuring 40 centimetres (16 in) long was discovered at a construction site in Tokyo's Kita Ward, close to the Kaminakazato Station on the JR Keihin Tohoku Line. The shell was detonated in place by a JGSDF UXO disposal squad in June, causing 150 scheduled rail and Shinkansen services to be halted for three hours and affecting 90,000 commuters. In July, an unexploded 1,000-kilogram (2,200 lb) US bomb from an air raid was discovered near the Akabane Station in the Kita Ward and defused on site by the JGSDF in November, resulting in the evacuation of 3,000 households nearby and causing several trains to be halted for an hour while the bomb was being defused.

On 13 April 2014, the JGSDF defused and removed an unexploded 250-kilogram (550 lb) US oil incendiary bomb discovered at a construction site in Kurume, Fukuoka Prefecture, which required the evacuation of 740 people living nearby.

On 16 March 2015, a 2,000-pound (910 kg) bomb was found in central Osaka.

In December 2019, 100 buildings were evacuated to remove a 500-pound (230 kg) World War II bomb found on Okinawa's Camp Kinser.

On 2 October 2024, more than 80 flights were cancelled at Miyazaki Airport after a previously undetected 500-pound (230 kg) World War II bomb detonated under a taxiway, leaving a substantial crater. No aircraft were nearby and no injuries were reported. Officials launched an investigation into what caused the bomb to suddenly explode.

==== Indian Administered Kashmir ====
Tosa Maidan, a scenic meadow in the Budgam district of Indian-administered Kashmir, was used as a military firing range by the Indian Army and Indian Air Force from 1964 to 2014. Decades of artillery exercises left the area littered with UXO, resulting in civilian casualties. Official records attribute at least 63 deaths and over 150 injuries to UXO explosions, though local reports suggest higher figures. In 2014, after significant public protests, the government declined to renew the military's lease. The Indian Army subsequently initiated "Operation Falah" to clear the area of unexploded ordnance. Despite these efforts, sporadic explosions continue to pose risks, leading to ongoing demands for thorough demining and compensation for affected families.

==== South Asia ====
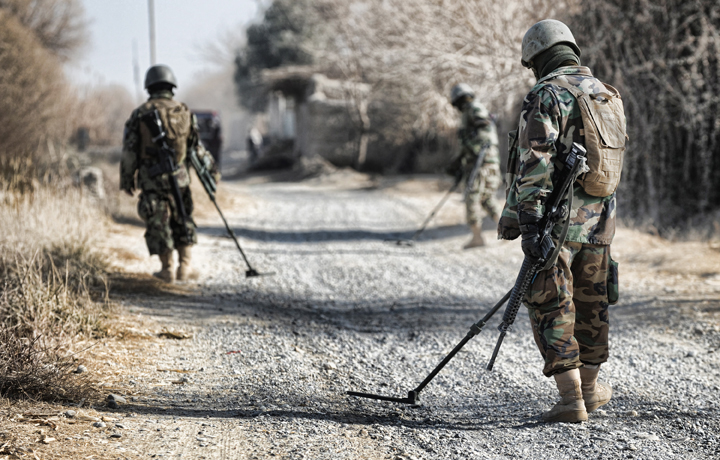
Clearing of explosives on a road in Afghanistan

==== Afghanistan ====
According to The Guardian, since 2001, the coalition forces dropped about 20,000 tonnes of ammunition over Afghanistan with an estimated 10% of munitions not detonated according to some experts. Many valleys, fields and dry riverbeds in Macca have been used by foreign soldiers as firing ranges, leaving them peppered with undetonated ammunition. Despite the removal of 16.5 million items since mine-clearing programmes were established in 1989 after the Soviet withdrawal, Macca and its predecessors have recorded 22,000 casualties in the same period.

==== Sri Lanka ====
According to The HALO Trust, following the Sri Lankan Civil War in 2009, over 1,600,000 landmines were left in the country. Since 2009 over 270,000 landmines have been safely destroyed and 280,000 people have been able to return to their homes. Following the signing of the Ottawa Treaty, Sri Lanka has committed to clearing all known landmines by 2028.

==== Cambodia ====
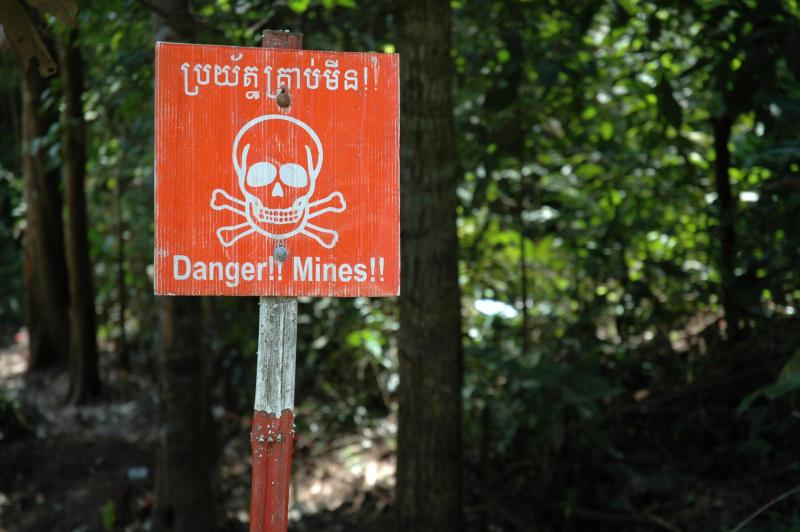
A landmine warning sign in Cambodia

Land mines in Cambodia are a major issue, especially in rural areas. Three decades of war resulted in 40,000+ amputees, some of the highest rates in the world. The Cambodian Mine Action Centre (CMAC) estimates that there may be as many as four to six million mines and other pieces of unexploded ordnance in Cambodia. Some estimates, however, run as high as ten million mines.

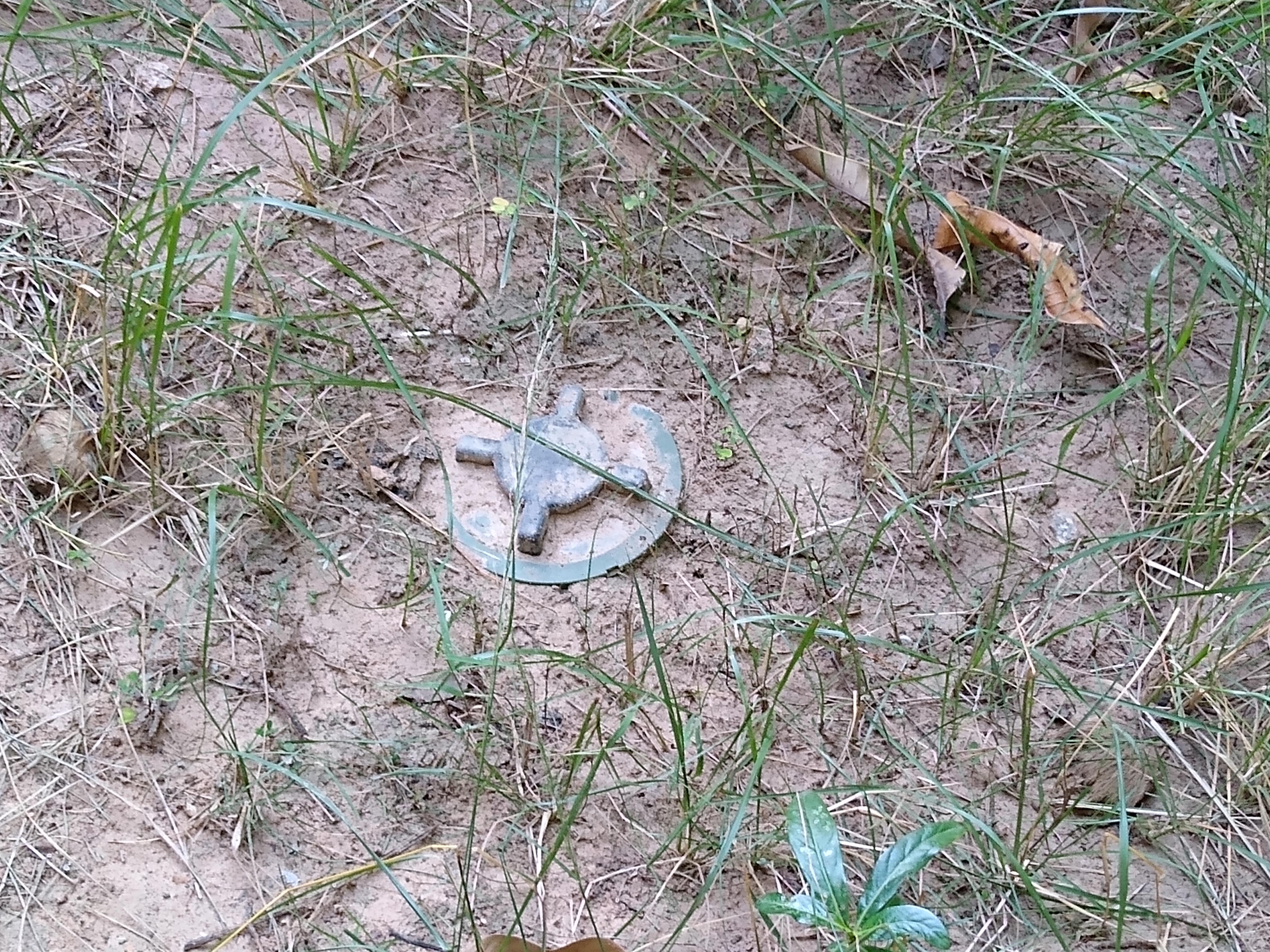
An anti-personnel mine on display at APOPO Visitor Center in Siem Reap

The Chinese-made land mines in Cambodia were placed by the Cambodian factions (including the Lon Nol, Khmer Rouge, the Heng Samrin and Hun Sen regimes, as well as the Coalition Government of Democratic Kampuchea who, with international support retained the UN seat throughout much of the 1980s) which clashed during the Civil War in Cambodia in the 1970s and 1980s. The Dangrek genocide in June 1979 was in great part due to civilian victims crossing over land mines placed along the border by Thai, Vietnamese and Khmer Rouge contingents. They were placed in the whole territory of the country. A common problem Cambodians faced with the anti-personnel mines is that even those who placed the mines didn't have maps or memory of their location.

While many mines were placed with the sole intent to harm humans, some were placed with the intent to protect an area. Many sacred temples were surrounded by land mines to protect them from looting, which used to be a major problem. The CMAC (Cambodia Mine Action Center) has cleared many of these areas and put up signs stating their work in previous minefields.

===== Laos =====
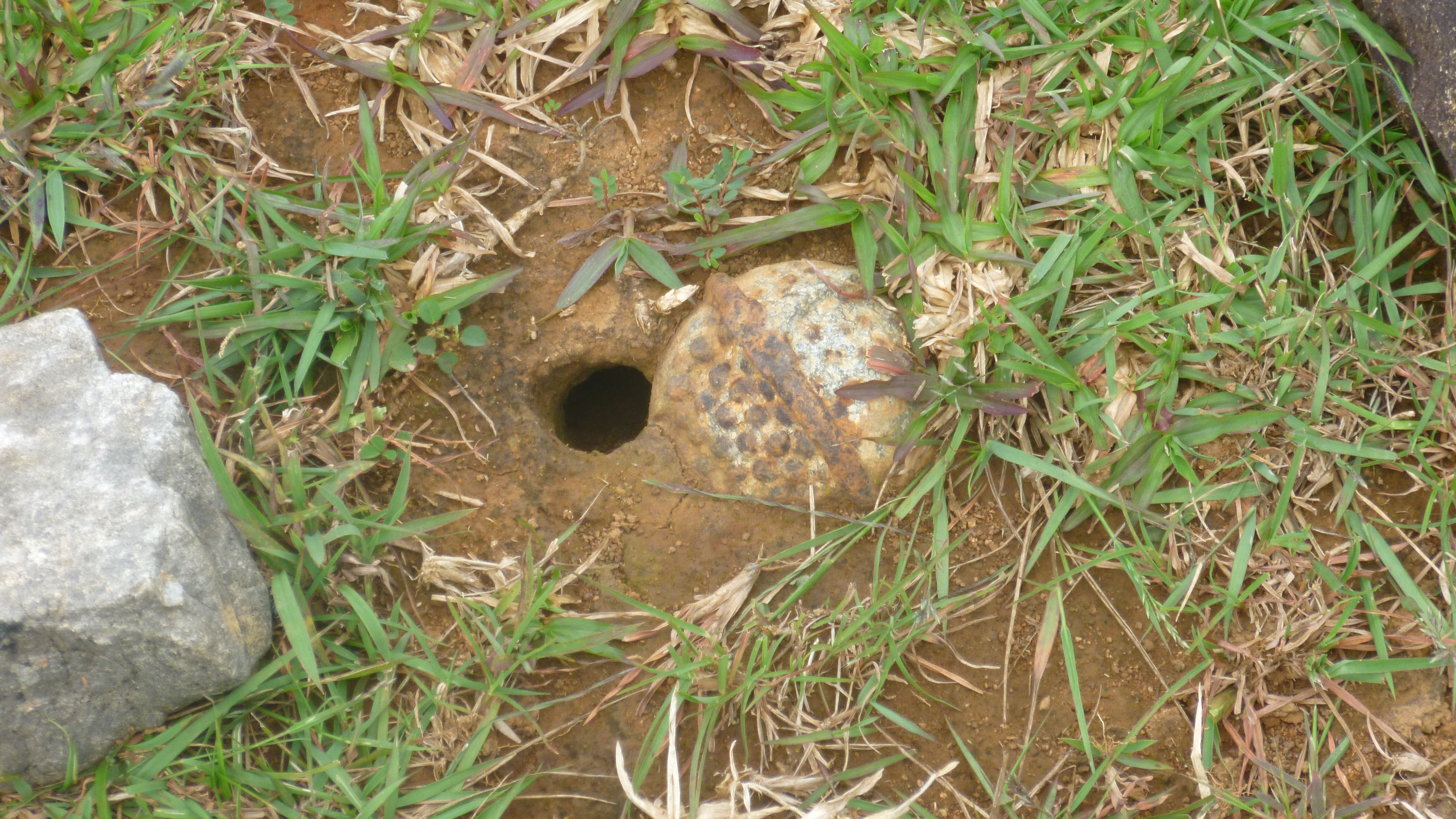
Unexploded BLU-26 "bombie" in Laos

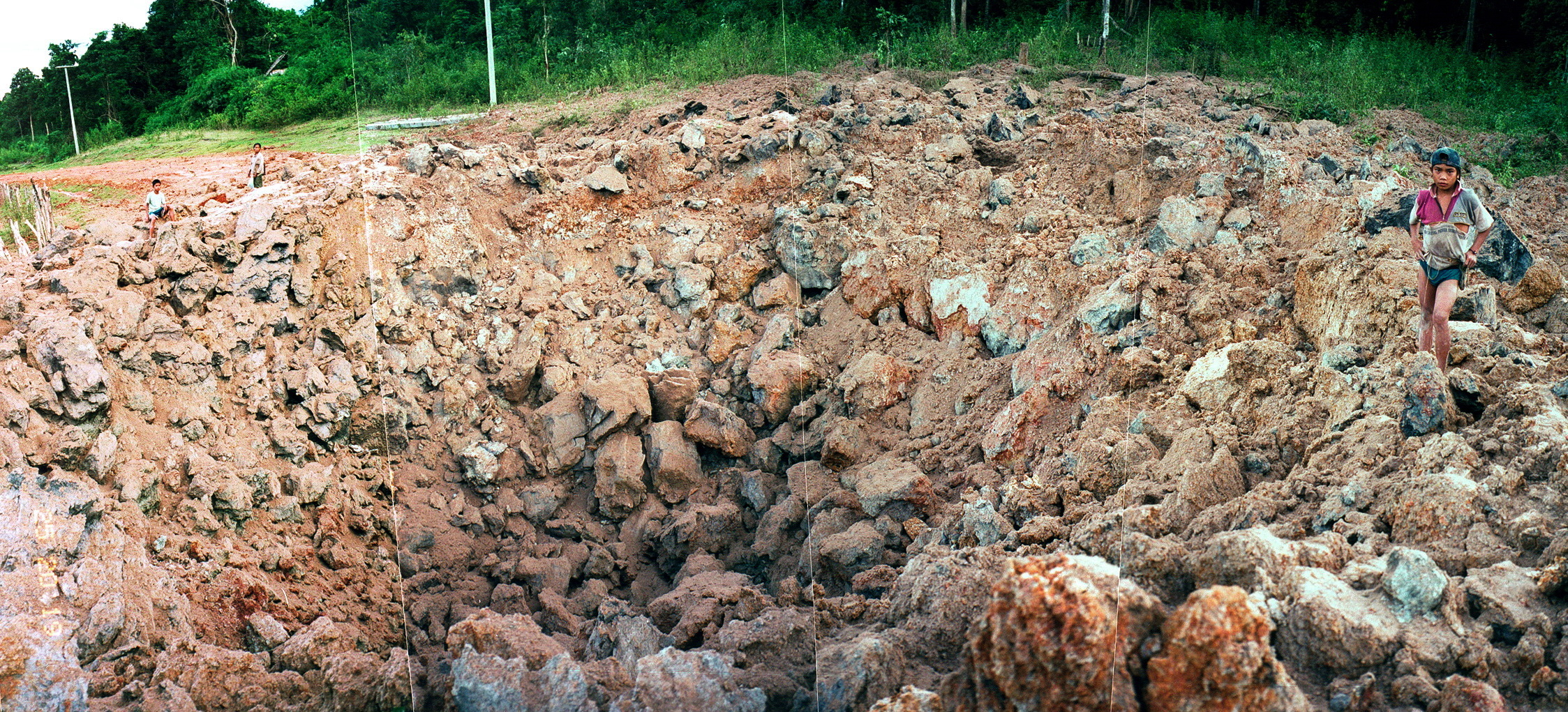
Bomb crater left after an approximately 450-kilogram (1,000 lb) US Air Force UXO exploded without warning in southern Laos in the year 2000. The children at the edge of the crater provide a sense of scale.

Laos is considered the world's most heavily bombed nation per capita. During the period of the Laotian Civil War and Vietnam War, over half a million American bombing missions dropped more than 2 million tons of ordnance on Laos, most of it anti-personnel cluster bombs. Each cluster bomb shell contained hundreds of individual bomblets, "bombies", about the size of a tennis ball. An estimated 30% of these munitions did not detonate. Some 288 million cluster munitions and about 75 million unexploded bombs were left across Laos after the war ended. Estimates are that present rate of demining will require nearly 100 years to clear. Around 30% of Laos is considered heavily contaminated with UXOs and ten of the eighteen Laotian provinces have been described as "severely contaminated" with artillery and mortar shells, mines, rockets, grenades, and other devices from various countries of origin. These munitions pose a continuing obstacle to agriculture and a special threat to children, who are attracted by the toylike devices.

From 1996 to 2009, more than 1 million items of UXO were destroyed, freeing up 23,000 hectares of land. Between 1999 and 2008, there were 2,184 casualties (including 834 deaths) from UXO incidents. Since the end of the conflict in 1975, unexploded ordnance, mostly from US bombing, has killed or injured over 25,000 people, half of them being children.

UXOs continue to be a contentious issue as it has impeded infrastructure development and railway construction within the nation, including the Boten–Vientiane railway which required clearing thousands of hectares for UXO and shrapnel.

===== Malaysia =====
In Malaysia, UXOs dating all the way back to World War II (Malayan campaign, Battle of Borneo (1941-1942), Borneo campaign) are frequently uncovered well into the 21st century.

===== Singapore =====
World War II UXOs dating to the Battle of Singapore are occasionally encountered. These can cause considerable disruption to public life due to the high population density of the city-state.

A 250kg World War II aerial bomb was discovered at Changi East construction site for the future Changi Airport Terminal 5 on 31 March 2026. Changi East is part of Changi Airport's expansion project, including the future Terminal 5. The bomb would be disposed on 1 April 2026 by the Singapore Armed Forces. The unexploded bomb is believed to be the heaviest found in Singapore in recent times.

Vietnam

In Vietnam, 800,000 tons of landmines and unexploded ordnance is buried in the land and mountains. From 1975 to 2015, up to 100,000 people have been injured or killed by bombs left over from the second Indochina war. Nearly one-fifth of the land is contaminated by UXOs.

At present, all 63 provinces and cities are contaminated with UXO and landmines. However, it is possible to prioritize demining for the Northern border provinces of Lang Son, Ha Giang and the six Central provinces of Nghe An, Ha Tinh, Quang Binh, Quang Tri, Thua Thien and Quang Ngai. Particularly in these 6 central provinces, up to 2010, there were 22,760 victims of landmines and UXO, of which 10,529 died and 12,231 were injured.

One of the most heavily contaminated province, Quảng Trị, has seen at least 3500 deaths since the end of the war and ongoing efforts will require over a decade to clear.

"The National Action Plan for the Prevention and Fighting of Unexploded Ordnance and Mines from 2010 to 2025" has been prepared and promulgated by the Vietnamese Government in April 2010.

=== Middle East ===
==== Iraq ====
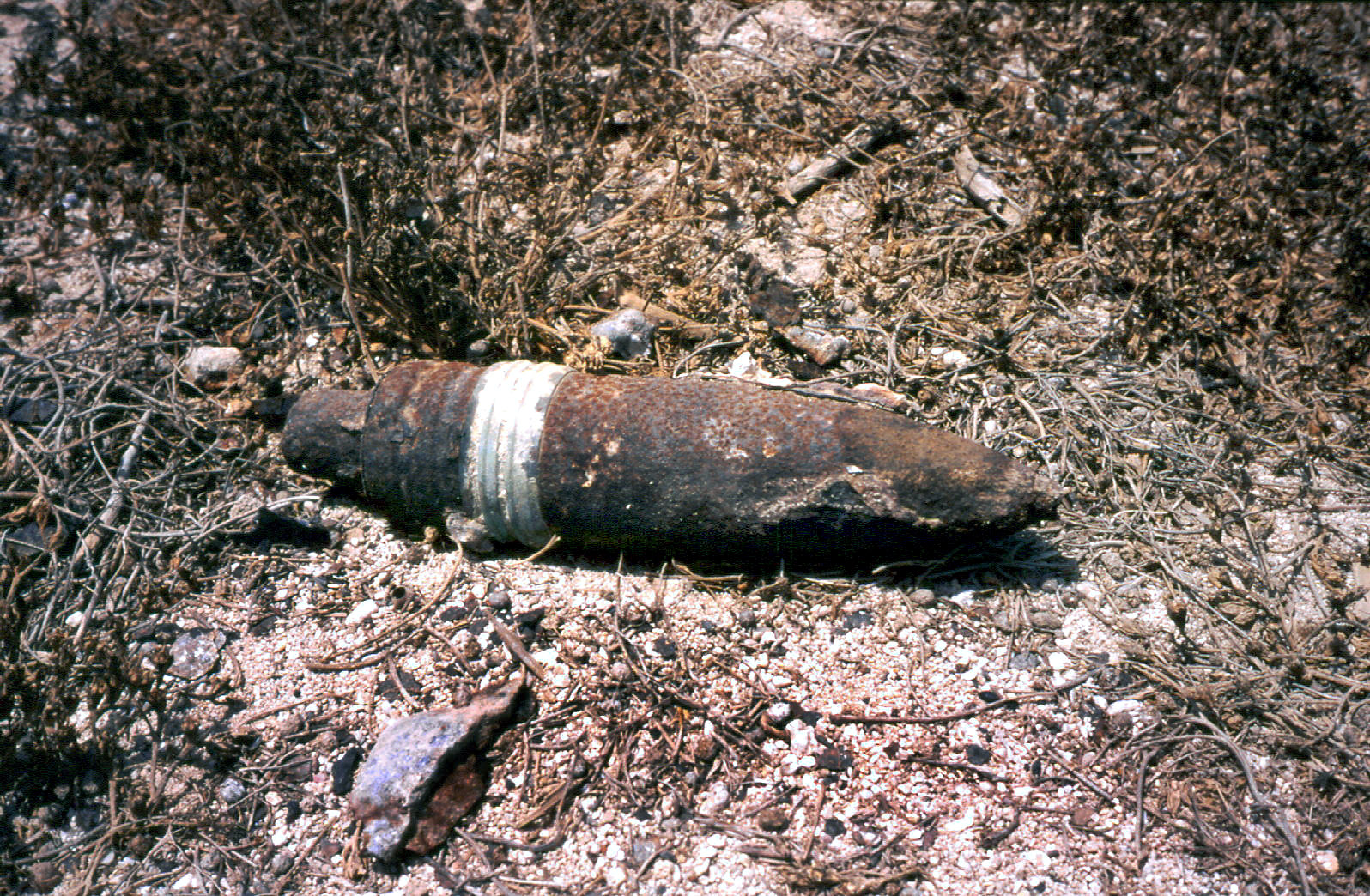
Corroded but live and dangerous Iraqi artillery shell dating from the Gulf War (1990–1991)

Iraq is widely contaminated with unexploded remnants of war from the Iran–Iraq War (1980–1988), the Gulf War (1990–1991), the Iraq War (2003–2011) and the Iraqi Civil War (2014–2017). The UXO in Iraq poses a particularly serious threat to civilians as millions of cluster bomb munitions were dropped in towns and densely populated areas by Coalition forces, mostly in the first few weeks of the 2003 invasion of Iraq. An estimated 30% of the munitions failed to detonate on impact and small unexploded bombs are regularly found in and around homes in Iraq, frequently maiming or killing civilians and restricting land use. From 1991 to 2009, an estimated 8,000 people were killed or maimed by cluster bomblets alone, 2,000 of which were children. Land mines are another part of the UXO problem in Iraq as they litter large areas of farmland and many oil fields, severely affecting economic recovery and development.

Reporting and monitoring is lacking in Iraq and no completely reliable survey and overview of the local threat levels exists. Useful statistics on injuries and deaths caused by UXO are also missing; only singular local reports exist. UNDP and UNICEF however, issued a partial survey report in 2009, concluding that the entire country is contaminated and more than 1.6 million Iraqis are affected by UXO. More than 1,730 km^{2} (670 square miles) in total are saturated with unexploded ordnance (including land mines). The south-east region and Baghdad are the most heavily contaminated areas and UNDP has designated around 4,000 communities as "hazard areas".

==== Israel ====
Certain areas in Israel are known as old and possibly active minefields, which The Israel National Mine Action Authority (INMAA) and the Ministry of Defense monitor and, at times, clear. In addition, there are cases in which unexploded ordnance have caused injuries and even death. In February 2010 a family of five was injured in the Golan Heights. In October 2026 a teenager was killed by an unexploded Hezbollah munition which was found on a school trip.

==== Kuwait ====
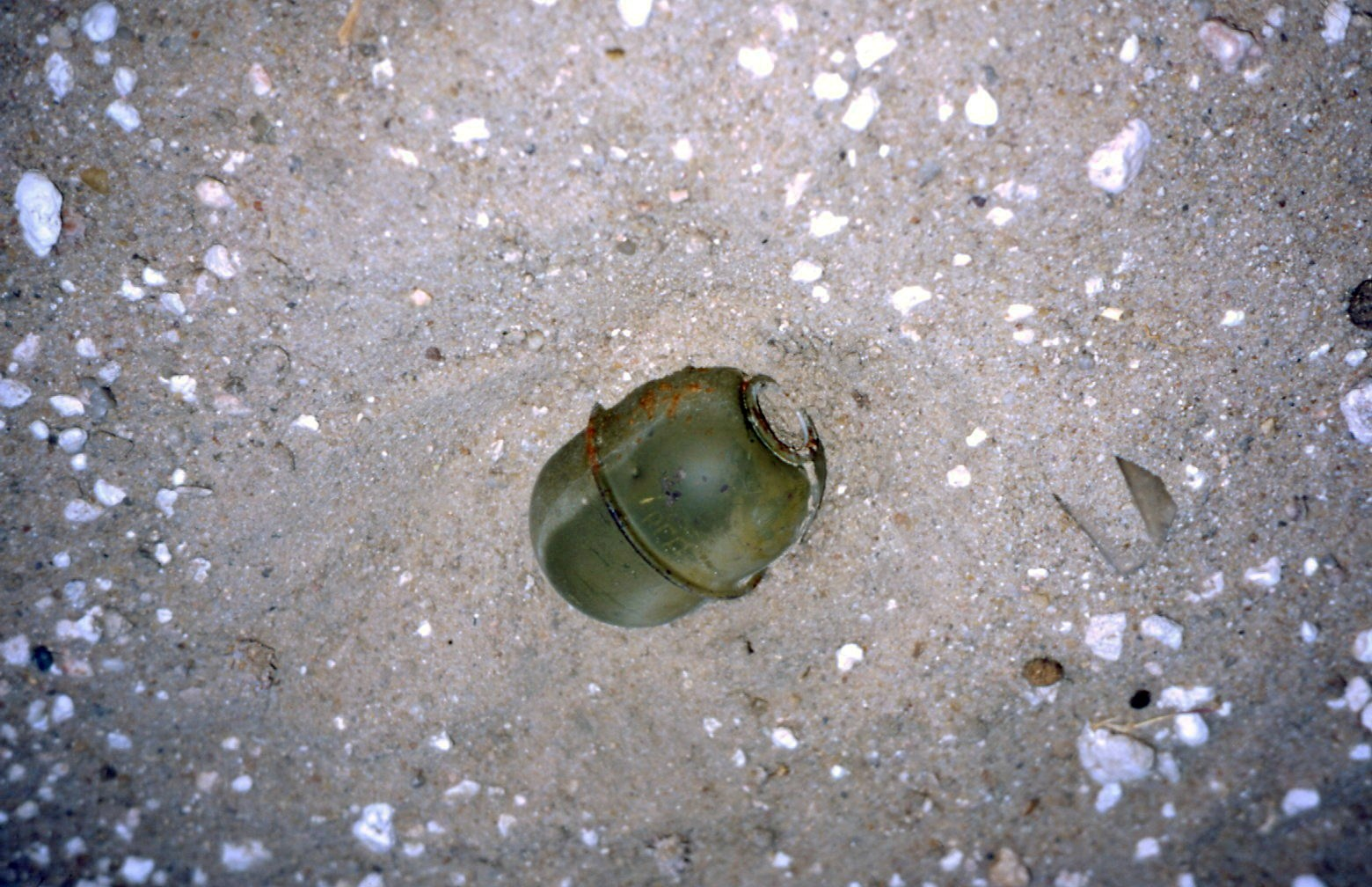
Discarded RGD-5 hand grenade (live but unfuzed) in Northern Kuwait dating from 1991

The government of Kuwait has launched the Kuwait Environmental Remediation Program, a set of deals of the scale of US$3 billion to promote, among other initiatives, the clearance of unexploded ordnance remaining from the First Gulf War.

Kuwait has the largest amount of landmines per square mile in the world. Following the start of UXO removal, an estimated 1,486 casualties have occurred.

There are numerous mines, bombs and other explosives left from the Persian Gulf war, which makes a simple U-turn on a dirt road a life-threatening maneuver, unless performed entirely in an area covered by fresh tire tracks. Risking walking or driving in unknown areas puts oneself in danger of detonating those forgotten explosives.

In Kuwait City, signage exists warning people to stay away from the beaches. Even experts have trouble identifying and clearing mines. According to a New York Times article: Several Saudi soldiers involved in mine clearing have been killed or wounded. Two were hurt while demonstrating mine clearing for reporters.

Weeks right after the Gulf War, hospitals in Kuwait reported that mines did not appear to be a major cause of injury. Six weeks after the Iraqi retreat, at Ahmadi Hospital, in an area thick with cluster bombs and Iraqi mines, the only injury was a hospital employee who had picked up an anti-personnel bomb as a souvenir.

==== Lebanon ====
Lebanon was initially contaminated by mines during its civil war, with both sides laying mines in the conflict. During several Israeli invasions of South Lebanon, up to 400,000 anti-personnel and anti-tank mines were laid along the Blue line, the 75 mile long demarcation line drawn up by the UN to mark the withdrawal of Israeli forces.

In 2014, fighting from the Syrian civil war spilled over into Lebanon when members of the Al-Nusra Front militant group attacked the town of Arsal, after one of their leaders was arrested. Fighting ensued for several days, and improvised explosive devices (IEDs) were left behind when the militants retreated. In 2015, the al-Nusra front attacked and seized some Israeli territory, and it took until 2017 for the LBF to fully dislodge them. They left behind IEDs to harm civilians, but these were fully cleared by 2023.

During the 2006 war between Israel and Lebanon, the Israel Defense Forces used large amounts of cluster weapons. For the majority of the war, they were used to target Hezbollah rocket launch points after they were detected by radar. Civilian casualties were reasonably low at this time, as many civilians had fled or were sheltering in basement. During the conflict, four million submunitions are estimated to have been dropped on South Lebanon.

However, during the final 72 hours of this war, before the ceasefire, both Hezbollah and Israeli rates of fire greatly increased. It is estimated that 90% cluster bombs used during the war were used in this time. Large areas were affected. It is thought that the Israeli bomblets have a failure rate of about 40%, which is much higher compared to other weapons. For this reason, hundreds of thousands of bomblets still litter the Israeli countryside, killing and maiming people every year. This is also the case for the borderland in South Lebanon as Khayyat argues, where the areas in which south Lebanese farmers work and herd their sheep are filled with ordnance and mines left from both the Israeli occupation of Southern Lebanon and the 2006 Lebanon War. This leaves the farmers to need to adapt to the bomb-filled environment as post-war efforts to remove unexploded ordnance and mines by international humanitarian organisations has arguably faltered out with time.

==== Yemen ====
Since the start of the Yemeni Civil War, the country has been plagued with unexploded munitions. In 2022 alone, the United Nations Development Programme (UNDP), Yemen Executive Mine Action Centre (YEMAC), and Yemen Mine Action Co-ordination Centre (Y-MACC) destroyed or removed 81,000 explosive devices, including 9,054 anti-vehicle landmines, 861 anti-personnel landmines, and 3,149 improvised explosive devices (IEDs), which in turn significantly reduced the risk of death or injury from IEDs over 6,500,000 square miles (17,000,000 km^{2}).

=== Europe ===
Despite enormous demining efforts, Europe is still affected by UXO, mainly from World War I and World War II, some countries more than others. However, more recent military conflicts have also affected some areas severely, in particular Ukraine and the western Balkans. After WWII, large quantities of unexploded ordnance were disposed of primarily in the Baltic Sea and North Sea, as well as other lakes and rivers to a smaller extent. These submerged munitions still represent a major threat to fishers and marine wildlife.

==== Austria ====
Unexploded ordnance from World War II in Austria is blown up twice a year in the military training area near Allentsteig. Moreover, explosives are still being recovered from lakes, rivers and mountains dating back to World War I on the Italian Front between Austria-Hungary and Italy.

==== Balkans ====
As a result of the Yugoslav Wars (1991–2001), the countries of Albania, Bosnia-Herzegovina, Croatia and Kosovo have all been affected by UXOs, mostly land mines in regions where intense fighting took place. Due to the lack of awareness of these post-war landmines, civilian casualties have risen since the end of the wars. As many as 2,000 people have been killed by these landmines alone, with countless others dying due to different unexploded munitions. Many efforts made by peacekeeping forces in Bosnia such as IFOR, SFOR (and its successor EUFOR ALTHEA), and in Kosovo with KFOR in order to contain these landmines have been met with some difficulty. Landslides caused by heavy rainfall and flooding have led to migration of landmines, further complicating efforts.

The Federal Civil Protection Administration (FUCZ) team deactivated and destroyed four World War II bombs found at a construction site in the centre of Sarajevo in September 2019.

In November 2023, a US-funded project cleared over 395 acres of mined land in Mostar, Bosnia and Herzegovina's sixth-largest city, and declared the area mine-free. As of September 2023, the Bosnia and Herzegovina Mine Action Center estimates that over 200,000 acres in the country are still hazardous in contrast to the over 1 million acres considered unsafe in 1996. The US is also supporting the government in an effort to clear Brčko District by the end of 2024.

==== France and Belgium ====
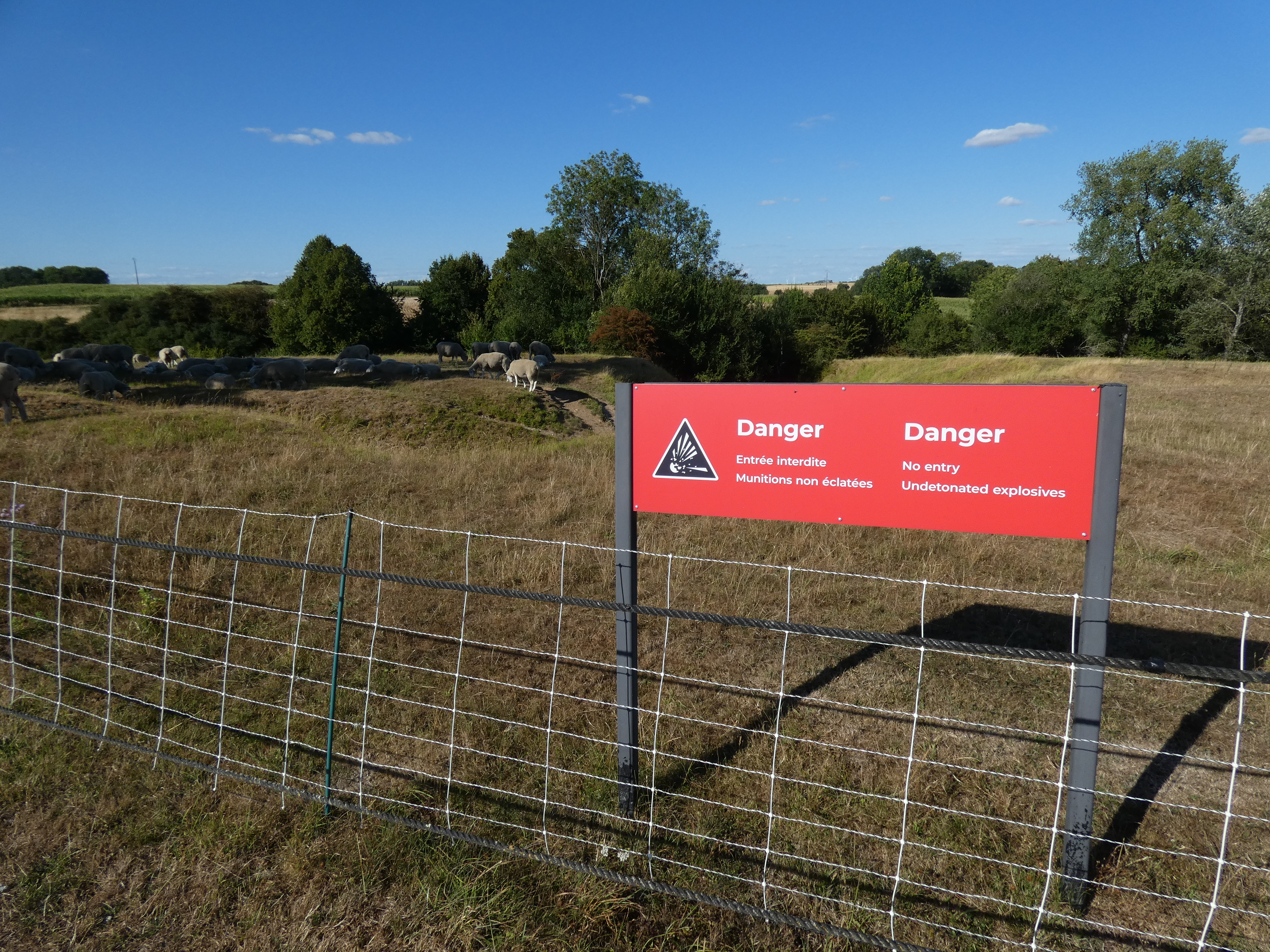
Certain areas in France are still off-limits due to undetonated WW1 ordnance

The First World War and, to a lesser extent, the Second World War, left a considerable amount of unexploded ordnance in France, including chemical weapons. Each year in France, approximately 500 tonnes of unexploded ordnance are destroyed by specialized services.

In the Ardennes region of France, large-scale citizen evacuations were necessary during MEC removal operations in 2001. In the forests of Verdun, French government démineurs working for the Département du Déminage still hunt for poisonous, volatile, and/or explosive munitions and recover about 900 tons every year. The most feared are corroded artillery shells containing chemical warfare agents such as mustard gas. French and Flemish farmers still find many UXOs when ploughing their fields, the so-called "iron harvest".

In Belgium, Dovo, the country's bomb disposal unit, recovers between 150 and 200 tons of unexploded bombs each year. Over 20 members of the unit have been killed since it was formed in 1919.

In February 2019, a 450 kg (1,000 lb) bomb was found at a construction site at Porte de la Chapelle, near the Gare du Nord in Paris. The bomb, which led to a temporary cancellation of Eurostar trains to Paris and evacuation of 2,000 people, was probably dropped by the RAF in April 1944, targeting the Nazi-occupied Paris before the D-Day landings in Normandy.

==== Germany ====
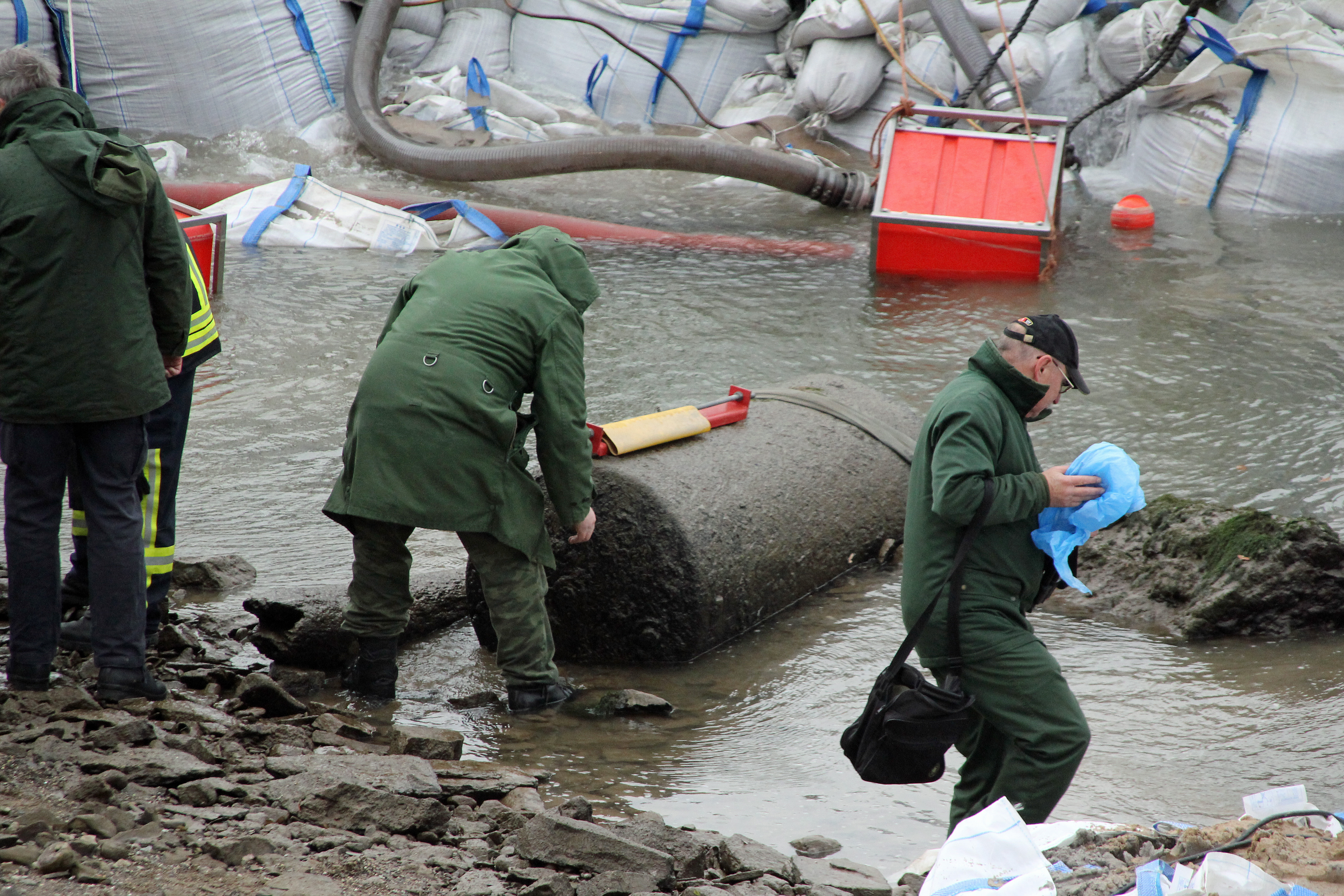
Disposal of a 4,000-pound (1,800 kg) blockbuster bomb dropped by the RAF during World War II. Found in the Rhine near Koblenz, 4 December 2011. A linear shaped charge has been placed on top of the casing.

Video of the 2012 detonation in Munich

In Germany, the responsibility for UXO disposal falls to the states, each of which operates a bomb disposal unit. These are known as the Kampfmittelbeseitigungsdienst (KMBD) or Kampfmittelräumdienst (KRD) ("Explosive Ordnance Disposal Service") and are commonly part of the state police or report directly to a mid-level administrative district. Germany's bomb squads are considered some of the busiest worldwide, deactivating a bomb every two weeks.

The presence of UXO is an ongoing task. Areas that have been subjected to aircraft bombs and artillery shells or were known battle grounds are mapped. The reconnaissance photos of the allies taken after airstrikes may show UXO and are still used to this day for location. In mapped areas, new road projects, demolition, and new land developments require clearing with metal detectors by the authorities to obtain permits.

An estimated 5,500 UXOs from World War II are still uncovered each year in Germany, an average of 15 per day. Concentration is especially high in Berlin, where many artillery shells and smaller munitions from the Battle of Berlin are uncovered each year. One of the largest individual pieces ever found was an unexploded 'Tallboy' bomb uncovered in the Sorpe Dam in 1958.

===== 2010s =====
In 2011, a 1,800 kg (4,000 lb) RAF bomb from World War II was uncovered in Koblenz on the bottom of the Rhine River after a prolonged drought. It caused the evacuation of 45,000 people from the city. While most cases only make local news, one of the more spectacular finds was an American 230-kilogram (500 lb) aerial bomb discovered in Munich on 28 August 2012. As it was deemed too unsafe for transport, it had to be exploded on site, shattering windows over a wide area of Schwabing and causing structural damage to several homes despite precautions to minimize damage. In February 2015, a British unexploded bomb was discovered near Signal Iduna Park in Dortmund. In May 2015, some 20,000 people had to leave their homes in Cologne in order to be safe while a 1,000 kg (2,200 lb) bomb was defused.

On 20 December 2016, another 1,800 kg RAF bomb was found in the city centre of Augsburg and prompted the evacuation of 54,000 people on 25 December, which was considered the biggest bomb-related evacuation in Germany's post-war history at the time. In May 2017, 50,000 people in Hanover had to be evacuated in order to defuse three British unexploded bombs.

On 29 August 2017, a British HC 4000 bomb was discovered during construction work near the Goethe University in Frankfurt, requiring the evacuation of approximately 70,000 people within a radius of 1.5 km (0.9 mi). This was the largest evacuation in Germany since World War II. Later, it was successfully defused on 3 September. In the meantime, 21,000 residents in Koblenz were evacuated due to an unexploded 500 kg (1,100 lb) bomb dropped by the United States.

On 8 April 2018, a 1,800 kg bomb was defused in Paderborn, which caused the evacuation of more than 26,000 people. On 24 May 2018, a 250 kg (550 lb) bomb was defused in Dresden after the initial attempts of deactivation failed, and caused a small explosion. On 3 July 2018, a 250 kg bomb was disabled in Potsdam which caused 10,000 people to be evacuated from the region. In August 2018, 18,500 people in the city of Ludwigshafen had to be evacuated, in order to detonate a 500 kg (1,100 lb) bomb dropped by American forces.

In Summer 2018, high temperatures caused a decrease in the water level of the Elbe River in which grenades, mines and other explosives founded in the eastern German states of Saxony-Anhalt and Saxony were dumped. In October 2018, a World War II bomb was found during construction work in Europaviertel, Frankfurt, 16,000 people were affected within a radius of 700 m (2,300 ft). In November 2018, 10,000 people had to be evacuated, in order to defuse an American unexploded bomb found in Cologne. In December 2018, a 250 kg (550 lb) World War II bomb was discovered in Mönchengladbach.

On 31 January 2019, a World War II bomb was detonated in Lingen, Lower Saxony, which caused property damage of shattering windows and the evacuation of 9,000 people. In February 2019, an American unexploded bomb was found in Essen, which led to the evacuation of 4,000 residents within a radius of 250 to 500 metres (800 to 1,600 ft) of defusing work. A few weeks later, a 250 kg (550 lb) bomb led to the evacuation of 8,000 people in Nuremberg. In March 2019, another 250 kg bomb was found in Rostock. In April 2019, a World War II bomb was found near the U.S. military facilities in Wiesbaden.

On 14 April 2019, 600 people were evacuated when a bomb was discovered in Frankfurt's River Main. Divers with the city's fire service were participating in a routine training exercise when they found the 250 kg device. Later in April, thousands were evacuated in both Regensburg and Cologne, upon the discovery of unexploded ordnance.

On 23 June 2019, a World War II aerial bomb that was buried 4 metres (13 ft) underground in a field in Limburg self-detonated and left a crater that measured 10 metres (33 ft) wide and 4 metres (13 ft) deep. Though no one was injured, the explosion was powerful enough to register a minor tremor of 1.7 on the Richter scale. In June 2019, a World War II bomb, weighing 500 kilograms (1,100 lb), was found near the European Central Bank in Frankfurt am Main. More than 16,000 people were told to evacuate the location before the bomb was defused by the ordnance authorities on 7 July 2019. On 2 September 2019, over 15,000 people were evacuated in Hanover, after a World War II aerial bomb, weighing 230 kilograms (500 lb), was found at a construction site.

===== 2020s =====
In January 2020, 14,000 residents in Dortmund were ordered to leave their homes, during the disposal of two 250 kg (550 lb) bombs dropped by American and British forces. On 2 August 2021, 3,000 residents had to evacuate a 300-metre (980 ft) radius of the discovery site of a 250 kg (550 lb) unexploded bomb in Borsigplatz area of Dortmund.

On 29 October 2021, a five-year-old boy discovered a British hand grenade from World War II on the playground of his kindergarten "An der Beverbäke" in Oldenburg. He took it home in his backpack. The kindergarten is located on a former barracks site used by the Bundeswehr until 2007, which was converted into a residential area. On 1 December 2021, an old aircraft bomb exploded in the city of Munich during construction near Donnersbergerbruecke station.

On 11 October 2023, authorities ordered residents in Huckarde, Dortmund to leave their homes, with a 250 m (820 ft) radius from the discovery site of a 250-kilogram (550 lb) unexploded ordnance. A month later, on 10 November, a 500-metre (1,600 ft) security perimeter was established in Nordhausen, following the discovery of a 450-kilogram (990 lb) unexploded bomb. On 26 April 2024, authorities defused a 500-kilogram (1,100 lb) unexploded American bomb that had been discovered two days earlier at a university expansion site in Mainz. The discovery prompted the evacuation of residents within a radius of 500 to 1,000 metres (1,600 to 3,300 ft), affecting approximately 3,500 people.

In August and October 2024, four bombs were found and safely defused in Cologne, including a 1-ton U.S. WWII bomb which was discovered during construction work in Merheim. Authorities initially tried to defuse the bomb but could only remove one of its two fuses, leading to a controlled detonation on 11 October 2024. The operation, described as the most complex since 1945, required evacuating 6,400 residents and clearing three nearby hospitals.

On 4 June 2025, three WWII-era U.S. bombs were defused in Cologne's Deutz district after being uncovered during construction work. The devices—two weighing approximately 1,000 kilograms (2,200 lb) and one around 500 kilograms (1,100 lb)—were equipped with impact fuses and triggered the evacuation of roughly 20,000 people. Later that month, on 17 June, approximately 11,000 people were evacuated in Osnabrück's Lokviertel district to enable the defusal of a 500-kilogram World War II bomb. Later that year, on 4 December, a 450-kg British bomb was found in Cologne's Klettenbergpark, prompting the evacuation of 8,400 residents.

In January 2026, around 6,200 people were evacuated in Aachen after a 250-kilogram unexploded bomb was found near the city centre, leading to temporary railway disruptions. In March of the same year, approximately 18,000 residents were evacuated in Dresden following the discovery of a 250-kilogram British bomb during construction work, with authorities establishing a wide exclusion zone for defusal operations. Around the same time, a 450-kilogram U.S. bomb discovered at a construction site in Nuremberg prompted evacuations within a several-hundred-metre radius and caused transport disruptions. In August, around 5,600 households in Berlin's Neukölln district were evacuated after a 100-kilogram WWII bomb was found in the Neukölln Ship Canal, prompting a 500-metre exclusion zone and a major defusal operation. A month later, 5,235 people were ordered to evacuate the Dietrichsdorf district of Kiel in response to a 250-kilogram bomb.

==== Malta ====
Malta, then a British colony, was heavily bombarded by Italian and German aircraft during World War II. During the war the Royal Engineers had a Bomb Disposal Section which cleared about 7,300 unexploded bombs between 1940 and 1942. UXO is still being found intermittently in Malta as of the early 21st century, and the Explosive Ordnance Disposal unit of the Armed Forces of Malta (AFM) is responsible for removing such ordnance. In July 2021, a Hedgehog anti-submarine mortar which likely fell off a British warship during the war was discovered on a beach in Marsaxlokk and it was successfully removed by the AFM.

==== Poland ====
Unexploded ordnance from World War II is frequently discovered. For example, only in one month of 2024, 31 thousand UXOs were discovered and secured by Polish sappers. In October 2020, Polish Navy divers discovered a six-ton "Tallboy" British bomb. During the attempt to remotely neutralise the bomb, it exploded in a shipping canal off the Polish port city of Świnoujscie. The Polish Navy considered it a success because the divers were able to ultimately destroy the munition with zero casualties reported. The government reportedly took all necessary measures before they started to defuse the bomb, which included evacuating 750 residents from the site.

==== Spain ====
Since the 1980s, more than 750,000 pieces of UXO from the Spanish Civil War (1936–1939) has been recovered and destroyed by the Guardia Civil in Spain. In the 2010s, around 1,000 bombs, artillery shells and grenades have been defused every year.

==== Ukraine ====
Ukraine is contaminated with UXO from World War II, former Soviet military training and the current Russo-Ukrainian War. Most of the UXO from the World Wars was presumably been removed by demining efforts in the mid-1970s, but sporadic remnants may remain in unknown locations. New mines were laid with the beginning of the first phase of the Russo-Ukrainian war in 2014. Modern UXO includes both landmines and cluster bomblets dropped and set by both Ukrainian, anti-government and Russian forces. Reports of booby traps harming civilians also exist. Ukraine reports that Donetsk and Luhansk Oblast are the regions mostly affected by unexploded submunitions. Proper, reliable statistics are currently unavailable, and information from the involved combatants are possibly politically biased and partly speculative. However, 600 deaths and 2,000 injured due to UXO in 2014 and 2015 alone have been accounted for.

Since the beginning of the 2022 Russian invasion of Ukraine, both Russia and Ukraine have extensively used mines. As of April 2026, the State Emergency Service of Ukraine estimates that approximately 133,300 km² of Ukrainian territory, including temporarily occupied areas, remains potentially contaminated by UXO, representing about 20% of the country’s territory. The World Bank estimates that it will take $37.4 billion to clear the currently mined areas of Ukraine over a period of ten years. As of 10 September 2023, the estimated number of civilians killed by mines and unexploded ordnance is 989, and this number will increase as the conflict continues and well after the conflict has ended.

The Ukraine Mine Action Conference (UMAC2024) hosted by Switzerland and Ukraine aimed to clear 10 million hectares (12.3 million acres) of land from land mines and UXO, this equates to roughly 10% of Ukraine's arable land. Before the invasion of Ukraine, agriculture made up some 11% of Ukraine's GDP, at the end of 2023 this figure had fallen to 7.4%. According to data presented in a Tony Blair Institute report, land mines are "suppressing Ukraine's GDP by $11.2 billion (€10.27 billion) each year — equivalent to roughly 5.6% of GDP in 2021".

==== United Kingdom ====
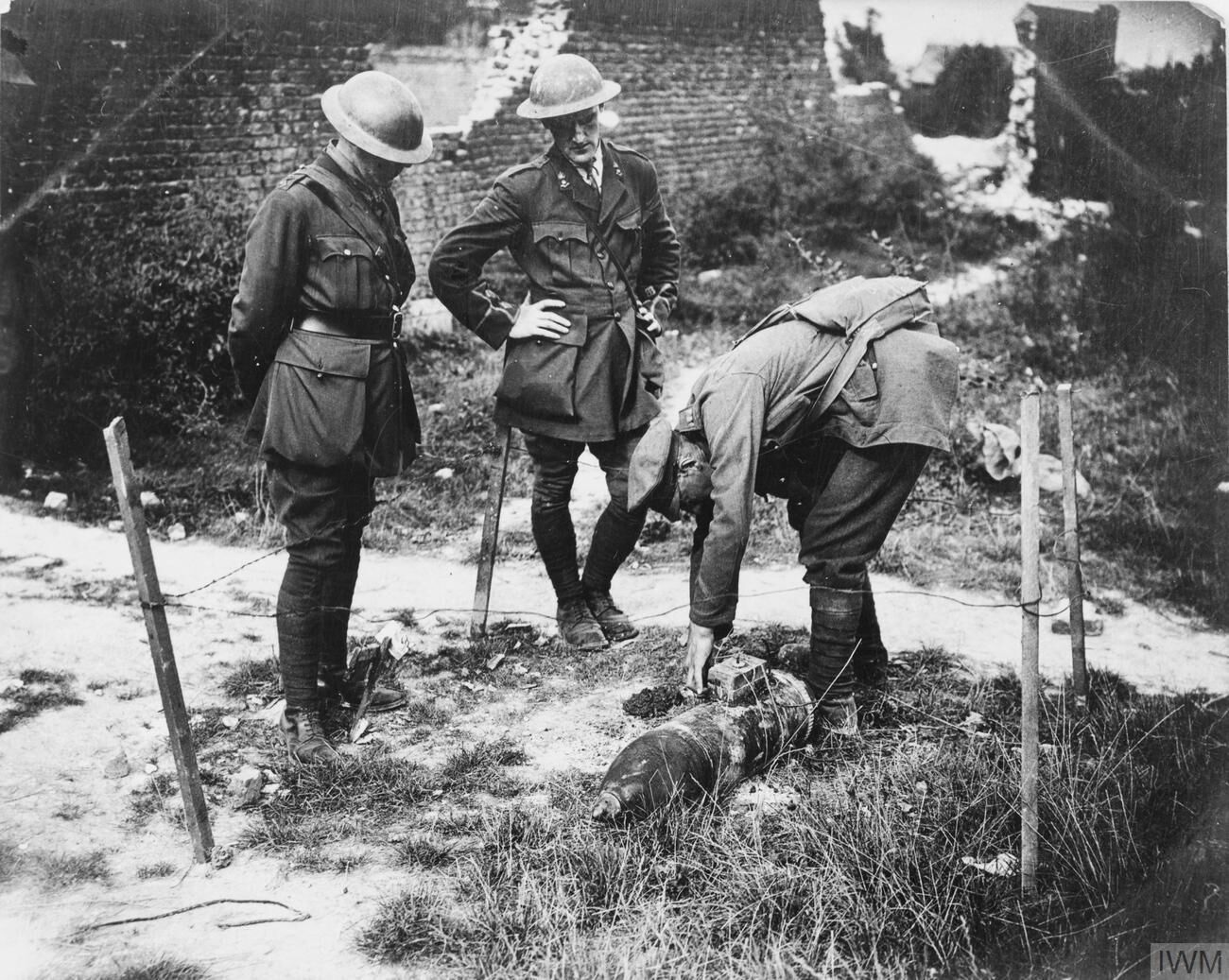
A British NCO prepares to dispose of an unexploded bomb during World War I.

UXO is standard terminology in the United Kingdom, although in artillery, especially on practice ranges, an unexploded shell is referred to as a blind, and during the Blitz in World War II an unexploded bomb was referred to as a UXB.

Most current UXO risk is limited to areas in cities, mainly London, Sheffield and Portsmouth, that were heavily bombed during the Blitz, and to land used by the military to store ammunition and for training. According to the Construction Industry Research and Information Association (CIRIA), from 2006 to 2009 over 15,000 items of ordnance were found in construction sites in the UK. It is not uncommon for many homes to be evacuated temporarily when a bomb is found. In April 2007, 1,000 residents were evacuated in Plymouth when a World War II bomb was discovered, and in June 2008 a 1,000-kilogram (2,200 lb) bomb was found in Bow in East London. In 2009 CIRIA published Unexploded Ordnance (UXO) – a guide for the construction industry to provide advice on assessing the risk posed by UXO.

The burden of Explosive Ordnance Disposal in the UK is split between Royal Engineers Bomb Disposal Officers, Royal Logistic Corps Ammunition Technicians in the Army, Clearance Divers of the Royal Navy and the Armourers of the Royal Air Force. The Metropolitan Police of London is the only force not to rely on the Ministry of Defence, although they generally focus on contemporary terrorist devices rather than unexploded ordnance and will often call military teams in to deal with larger and historical bombs.

In May 2016, a 230 kg (500 lb) bomb was found at the former Royal High Junior School in Bath which led to 1,000 houses being evacuated. In September 2016, a 500 kg (1,100 lb) bomb was discovered on the seabed in Portsmouth Harbour. In March 2017, a 230 kg (500 lb) bomb was found in Brondesbury Park, London. In May 2017, a 250 kg (550 lb) device was detonated in Birmingham. In February 2018, a 500 kg (1,100 lb) bomb was discovered in the Thames which forced London City Airport to cancel all the scheduled flights. In February 2019, a 76 mm (3 in) explosive device was located and destroyed in Dovercourt, near Harwich, Essex.

On 26 September 2019, Invicta Valley Primary School in Kings Hill was reportedly evacuated after an unexploded World War II bomb was discovered in its vicinity.

In February 2021, thousands of residents of Exeter were evacuated from their homes prior to the detonation of a 1,000 kg (2,200 lb) World War II bomb; the ensuing blast blew out windows and caused structural damage to nearby homes, leaving some uninhabitable.

On 20 February 2024, a 500 kg (1,100 lb) bomb from World War II was found in the garden of a residential property in Keyham, Plymouth. This prompted one of the largest evacuations in the UK since World War II, with more than 10,000 people evacuated. On 24 February, the bomb was taken out to sea and detonated, and the cordon in the area lifted.

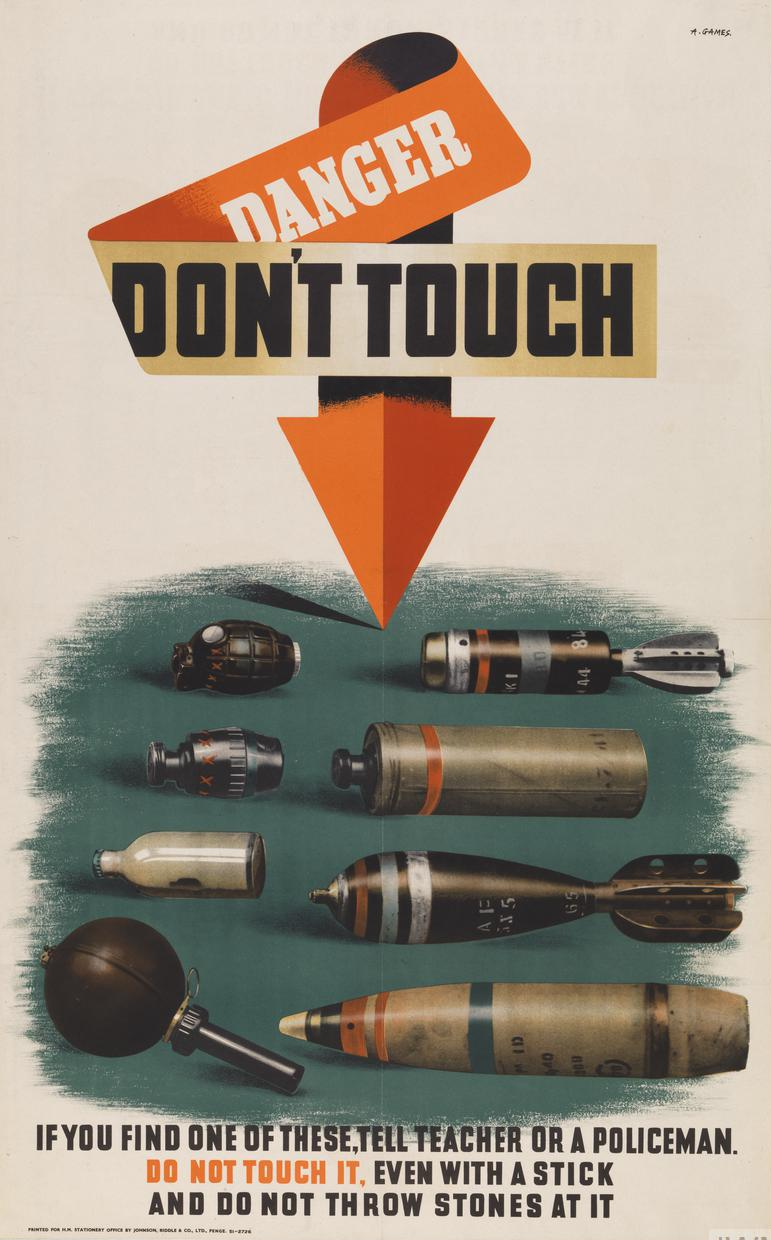
A World War II-era poster warning about unexploded ordnance

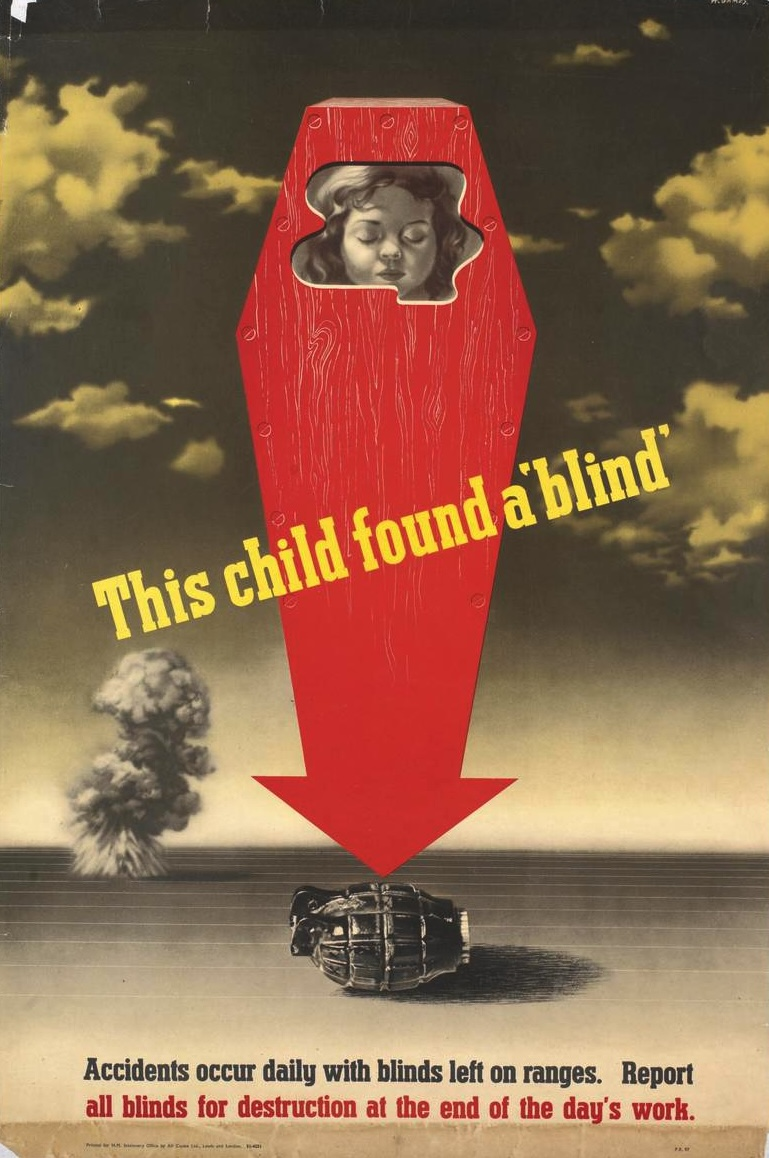
1943 poster by Abram Games warning against leaving blinds on firing ranges

=== Pacific ===
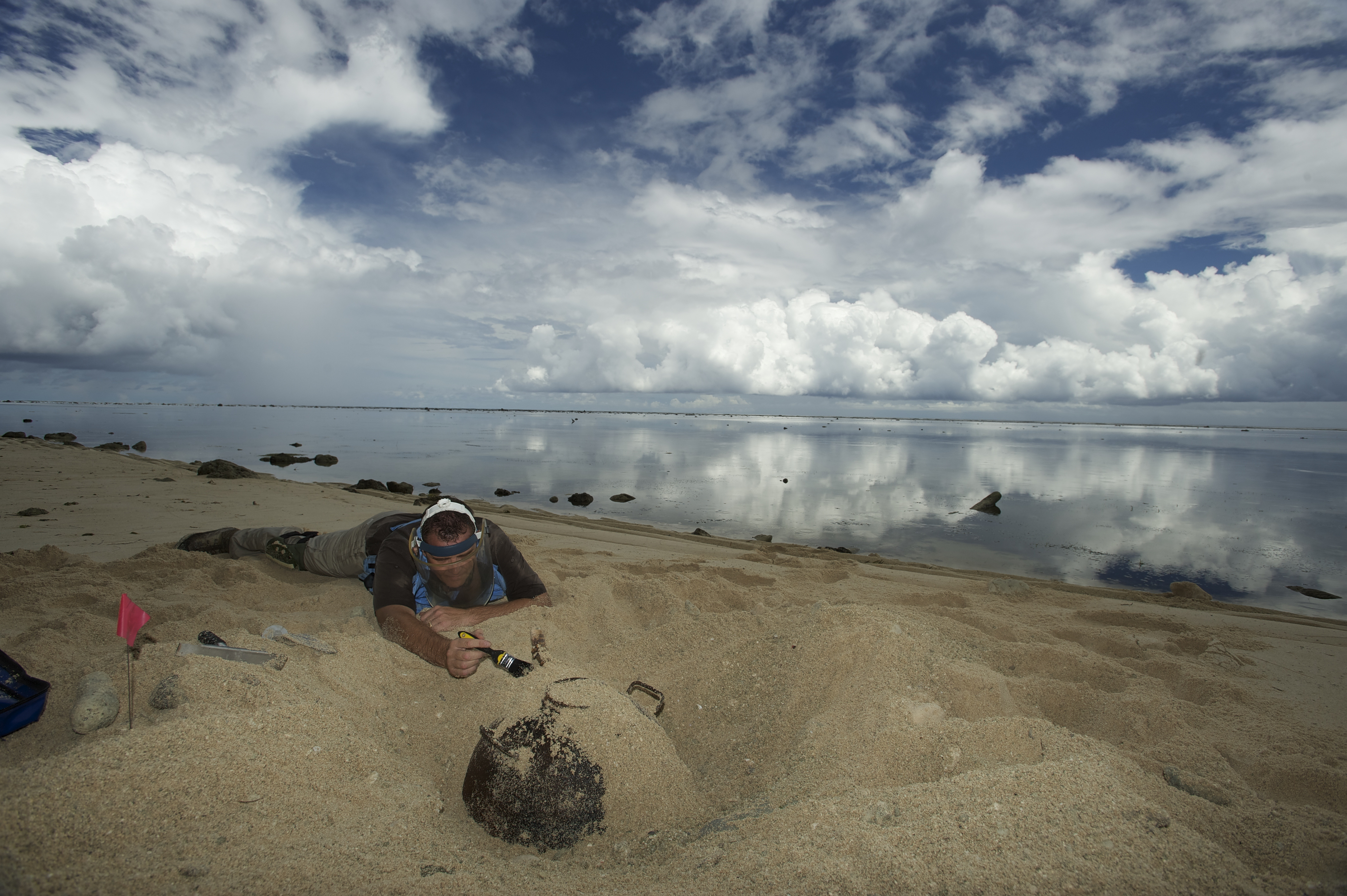
Demining of UXO in Palau

Buried and abandoned aerial and mortar bombs, artillery shells, and other unexploded ordnance from World War II have threatened communities across the islands of the South Pacific. As of 2014 the Office of Weapons Removal and Abatement in the U.S. Department of State's Bureau of Political-Military Affairs invested more than $5.6 million in support of conventional weapons destruction programs in the Pacific Islands.

On the battlefield of Peleliu Island in the Republic of Palau UXO removal made the island safe for tourism. At Hell's Point Guadalcanal Province in the Solomon Islands an explosive ordnance disposal training program was established which safely disposed of hundreds of items of UXO. It trained police personnel to respond to EOD call-outs in the island's highly populated areas. On Mili Atoll and Maloelap Atoll in the Marshall Islands removal of UXO has allowed for population expansion into formerly inaccessible areas.

In the Marianas, World War II-era unexploded ordnance is still often found and detonated under controlled conditions.

In September 2020, two Norwegian People's Aid employees were killed in an explosion in a residential area of Honiara, Solomon Islands, while clearing unexploded ordnance left over from the Pacific War of World War II.

== In international law ==
Protocol V of the Convention on Certain Conventional Weapons requires that when active hostilities have ended the parties must clear the areas under their control from "explosive remnants of war". In addition to clearance obligations, Protocol V of the CCW requires parties to record information on the use and location of explosive ordnance and to provide this data to facilitate post-conflict clearance. It also encourages cooperation and assistance, allowing affected states to request international help with resources or expertise for ERW (Explosive Remnants of War) removal. Protocol V aims to reduce the long-term dangers posed by unexploded munitions to civilians and supports safer post-conflict recovery. Land mines are covered similarly by Protocol II.

The Geneva Conventions and International humanitarian law address UXO indirectly through principles focused on civilian protection. Under Protocol I (1977), parties to a conflict are required to take precautions to minimize harm to civilians, which includes managing the risks posed by UXO with an emphasis on preventing long-term civilian casualties.

== Detection technology ==
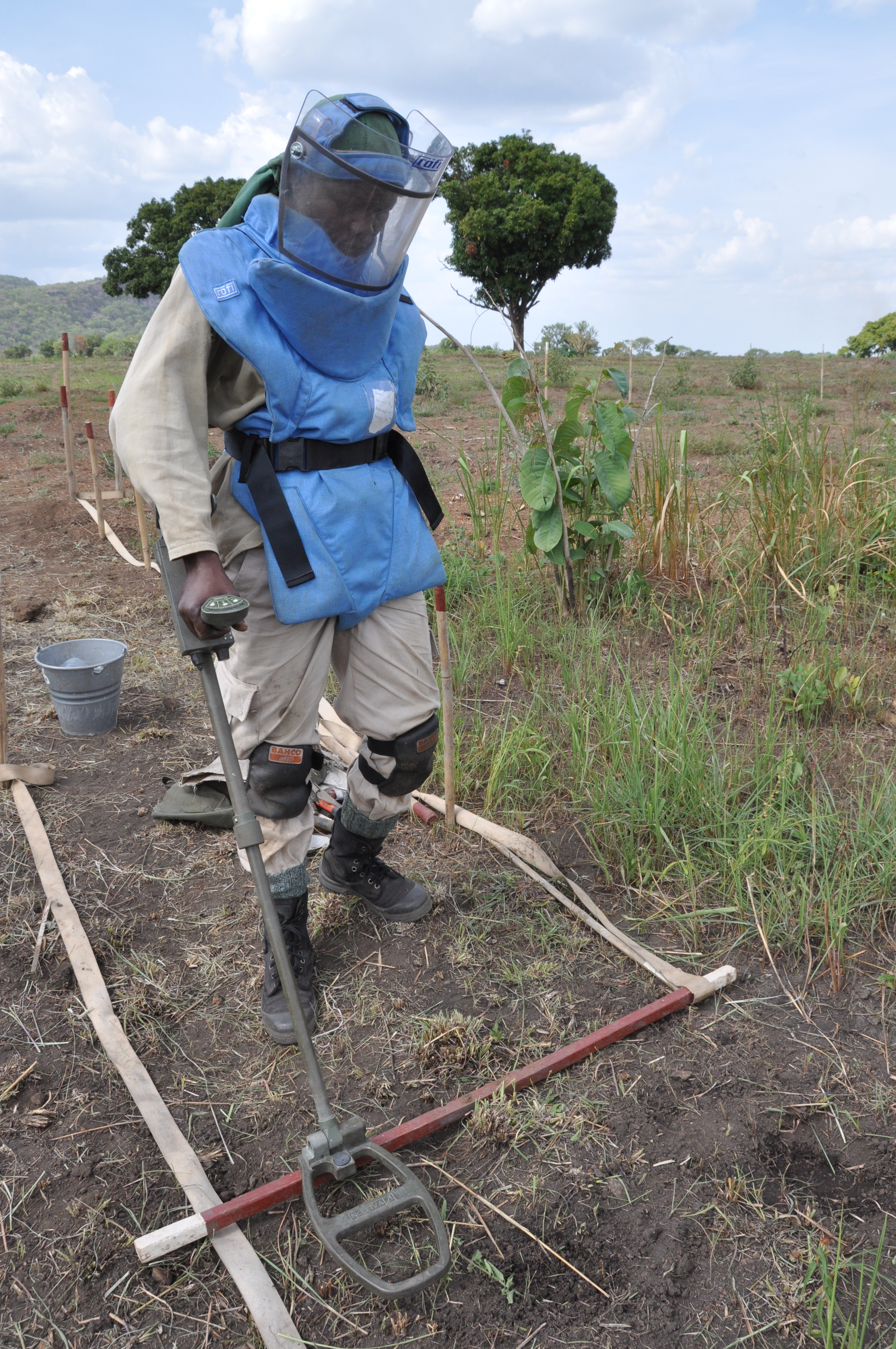
A woman manually demining in Sudan during 2010

Many weapons, including aerial bombs in particular, are discovered during construction work, after lying undetected for decades. Having failed to explode while resting undiscovered is no guarantee that a bomb will not explode when disturbed. Such discoveries are common in heavily bombed cities, without a serious enough threat to warrant systematic searching.

Where there is known to be much unexploded ordnance, in cases of unexploded subsoil ordnance a remote investigation is done by visual interpretation of available historical aerial photographs. Modern techniques can combine geophysical and survey methods with modern electromagnetic and magnetic detectors. This provides digital mapping of UXO contamination with the aim to better target subsequent excavations, reducing the cost of digging on every metallic contact and speeding the clearance process. Magnetometer probes can detect UXO and provide geotechnical data before drilling or piling is carried out.

In the U.S., the Strategic Environmental Research and Development Program (SERDP) and Environmental Security Technology Certification Program (ESTCP) Department of Defense programs fund research into the detection and discrimination of UXO from scrap metal. Much of the cost of UXO removal comes from removing non-explosive items that the metal detectors have identified, so improved discrimination is critical. New techniques such as shape reconstruction from magnetic data and better de-noising techniques will reduce cleanup costs and enhance recovery. The Interstate Technology & Regulatory Council published a Geophysical Classification for Munitions Response guidance document in August 2015. UXO or UXBs (as they are called in some countries – unexploded bombs) are broadly classified into buried and unburied. The disposal team carries out reconnaissance of the area and determines the location of the ordnance. If is not buried it may be dug up carefully and disposed of. But if the bomb is buried it becomes a huge task. A team is formed to find the location of the bomb using metal detectors and then the earth is dug carefully.

== Effects post-conflict ==
There are a variety of effects unexploded ordnance contamination has on post-conflict societies other than physical harm from detonation. Segments of society which are also negatively affected include foreign direct investment, education, aid distribution, industrialization, and the environment.

=== Industrialisation ===
UXO presence reduces farming communities' ability to use industrial machinery due to higher likelihood of triggering a buried munition. As well as this, large scale infrastructure projects such as road, rail, dam, or bridge building which require heavy machinery are prevented due to the risk of setting off UXO. These two factors in turn reduce road building and therefore prevent other more remote communities from industrializing themselves.

=== Aid distribution ===
Contaminated areas experience more difficulties in providing humanitarian aid to rural or remote communities. Infrastructure for transportation is either impossible to develop, or preexisting infrastructure is difficult to demine.

=== Environmental effects ===
Demining procedures destroy topsoil. This causes increased erosion and can reduce the fertility of arable land.

Munitions which are left over a long period of time degrade and eventually poison the soil or groundwater around them.

=== Education ===
The inhibition of necessary resources correlates with decreases in education. Injuries experienced by older members of the community take children away from classrooms to support a family's subsistence agriculture techniques.

=== Foreign direct investment ===
Foreign direct investment from more developed nations is discouraged due to difficulty in clearing contaminated areas.

== See also ==
- Ammunition dump
- Bombhunters, a 2006 documentary film about the effects of unexploded ordnance on Cambodian people
- Danger UXB, a 1979 British ITV television series set during the World War II
- Land of Mine, a 2015 movie about post-WWII demining in Denmark
- Delay-action bomb
- Dud
- Mines Advisory Group
- Ordnance
- Ottawa Treaty
- Red Zone
- ZEUS-HLONS (HMMWV Laser Ordnance Neutralization System)
