= Nordmarkt (Dortmund) =

Human settlement in Germany

Coordinates: 51.525863°N 7.465637°E

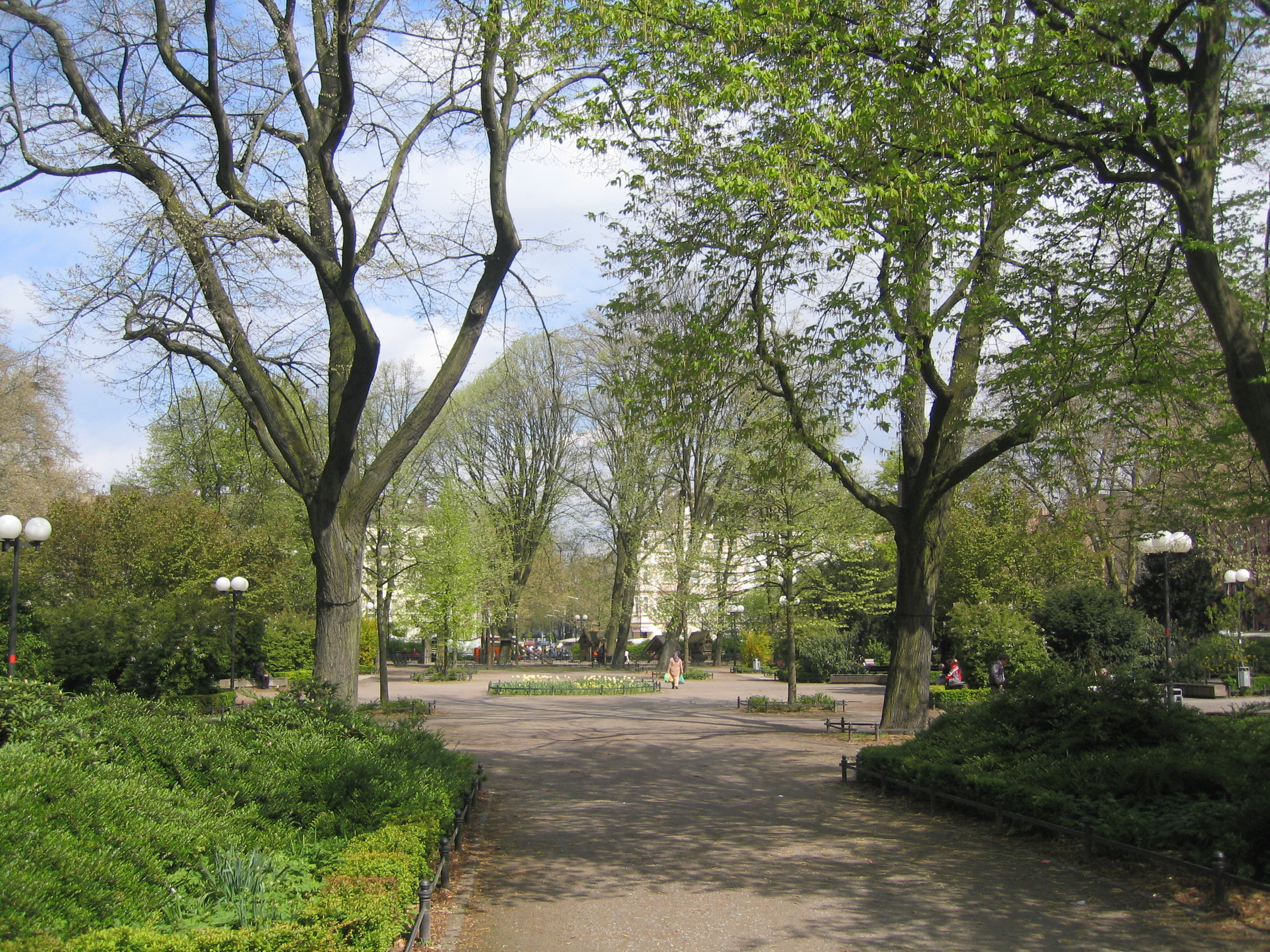
The Nordmarkt square today

Nordmarkt is a borough in the Stadtbezirk ("City District") Innenstadt-Nord (Northern city center) in Dortmund, Germany.

It is named after a large square in the northern city center. Being a working class quarter, this part of the city was sometimes scene of violent clashes between Nazis and their left-wing opponents during the final stage of the Weimar Republic. On October 16, 1932 two people died and 14 people were hurt during the Schlacht am Nordmarkt ("Battle at the Nordmarkt"). From 1933 to 1945 the square bore the name of Horst Wessel.

== Population ==
Today Nordmarkt with a population of 28,245 living in only 3,25 square kilometers is the most populous and dense borough of Dortmund which means over 8,000 people living in a square kilometer; it can be seen from architecture which is mostly high and closed. 75% of the population are immigrants and their children.

== See also ==
- Münsterstraße (street in Dortmund): street in this borough
