= Borsigplatz =

Coordinates: 51°31′24″N 7°28′54″E

- Borough
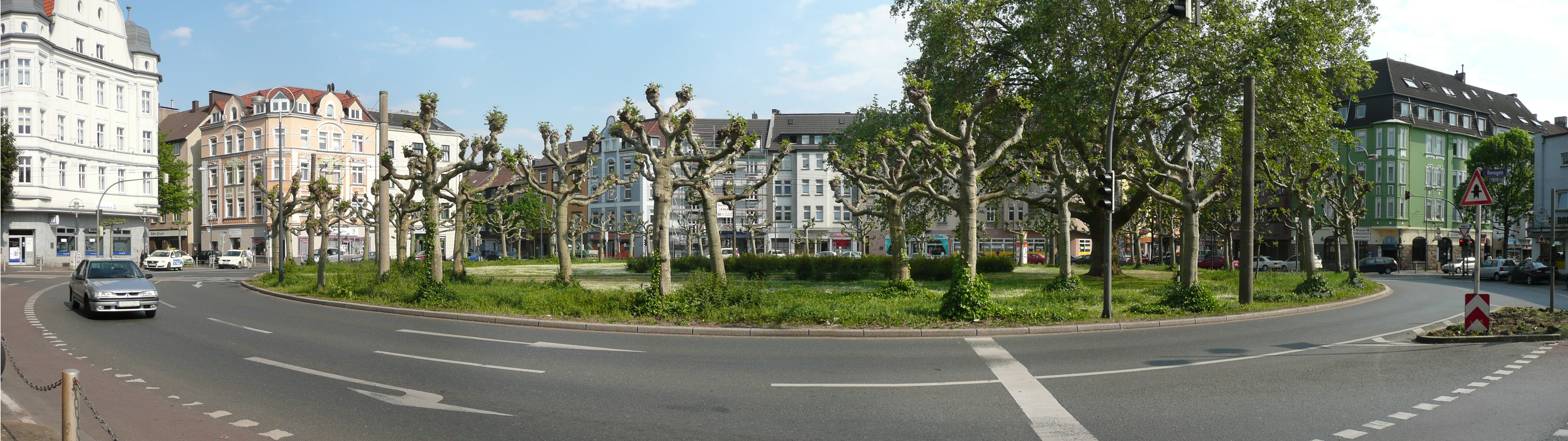
- Borsigplatz with roundabout
- Interactive map of Borsigplatz
- Country: Germany
- City: Dortmund
- Urban district: Innenstadt-Nord

Population (December 2012)
  - Total: 11,141

Borsigplatz is a borough (officially a statistical district) in the urban district ("Stadtbezirk") Innenstadt-Nord in Dortmund, Germany. It lies in the northern part of the city center, just outside the former city wall. It has a population of 11,141 (December 2012).

The eponymous square, which gives the borough its name, is famous for being the birthplace of football club Borussia Dortmund. The club was founded in 1909 by members of a catholic youth group in a bar situated right at the square.

As the rest of Dortmund's northern city center, the borough has suffered from the fall of the coal and steel industry. The unemployment rate is high, since this part of the city was traditionally inhabited by industrial workers. 67.9 percent of the inhabitants have a migration background, which is the second highest number of the 62 statistical districts in Dortmund (after Nordmarkt).
