= Münsterstraße (street in Dortmund) =

Street in Dortmund Innenstadt-Nord (district), Germany

Münsterstraße (German pronunciation: [ˈmʏnstɐˌʃtʁaːsə], lit. 'Münster Street') is the main business street of Nordstadt, the northern downtown district of Dortmund, Germany. The Münsterstraße neighborhood is known for its mix of multicultural restaurants, variety of shops, and large population of immigrants. The street is close to the city center of Dortmund, and the Dortmund Hauptbahnhof (Dortmund Central Station). The underground has a stop at the Münsterstraße metro Station, served by lines U41 and U45 (during peak hours).

== History ==
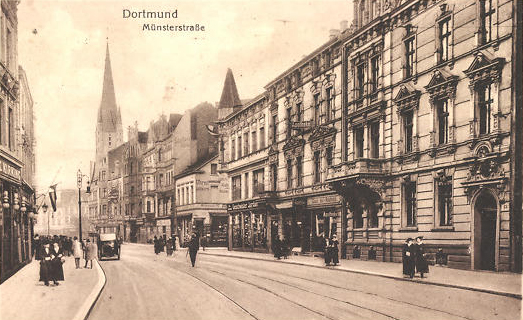
Münsterstraße in 1914

The street in the Middle Ages connected various cities in the region. After the construction of the main station in 1847, the medieval arterial road developed to a residential and commercial street. Several bars and restaurants were also located at Münsterstraße. Deutsches Haus and Die blaue Taverne were known as places in Dortmund, where offset agreements were made between traders. The Realschule of Dortmund was situated at Münsterstraße and moved in 1907 from the building Münsterstraße 158, which was rented from the local Sparkasse, to Münsterstraße 124. Today, this school is the Helmholtz-Gymnasium.

Nordstadt Dortmund grew as a working-class district in the 19th century. The history of today's Nordstadt and this street and district was shaped especially after the Second World War. Due to the increased influx of immigrant workers from Turkey, their influence became prominent in this neighborhood, due to Nordstadt's low rents and the cooperation among the so-called Gastarbeiter (guest/migrant workers). The migrant workers usually opened their shops in this street, as it was previously considered a shopping street. The next wave of immigration came in the 1990s from the former Yugoslavia, especially from Albania (including Kosovo), Bosnia and Herzegovina and so on.

When the wars in Iraq and Afghanistan began in the 2000s, there was an influx of immigrants from these regions. Throughout the decade, people from the Middle East, mostly from Lebanon, and North Africa, especially Morocco, came and opened their businesses in Münsterstraße. Recent migration comes mostly from Lebanon and Syria. Today (2015), 70.4% of the inhabitants of the entire district have a "migration background" (German: Migrationshintergrund), meaning they or one of their parents immigrated to Germany after 1955; in the Nordmarkt quarter where the street is located, the percentage is 75%.

== Exhibition ==
In 2015, Münsterstraße was the subject of an exhibition called Die Münsterstraße – Dortmunds buntes Pflaster (Münsterstraße – Dortmund's colorful cobbled street) at the Museum für Kunst und Kulturgeschichte. The exhibition presented 150 years of the street's history through photographs, maps, and everyday objects.

== Present ==
In the 2010s, internet cafés, cell phone stores, as well as Turkish, Italian, and Arab fast-food restaurants, and stores for food and furniture, as well as hookah bars can be found in the pedestrian zone along the Münsterstraße. The Roxy cinema, at number 95, has been praised by newspaper Westfälische Rundschau for its "elegance and comfort."

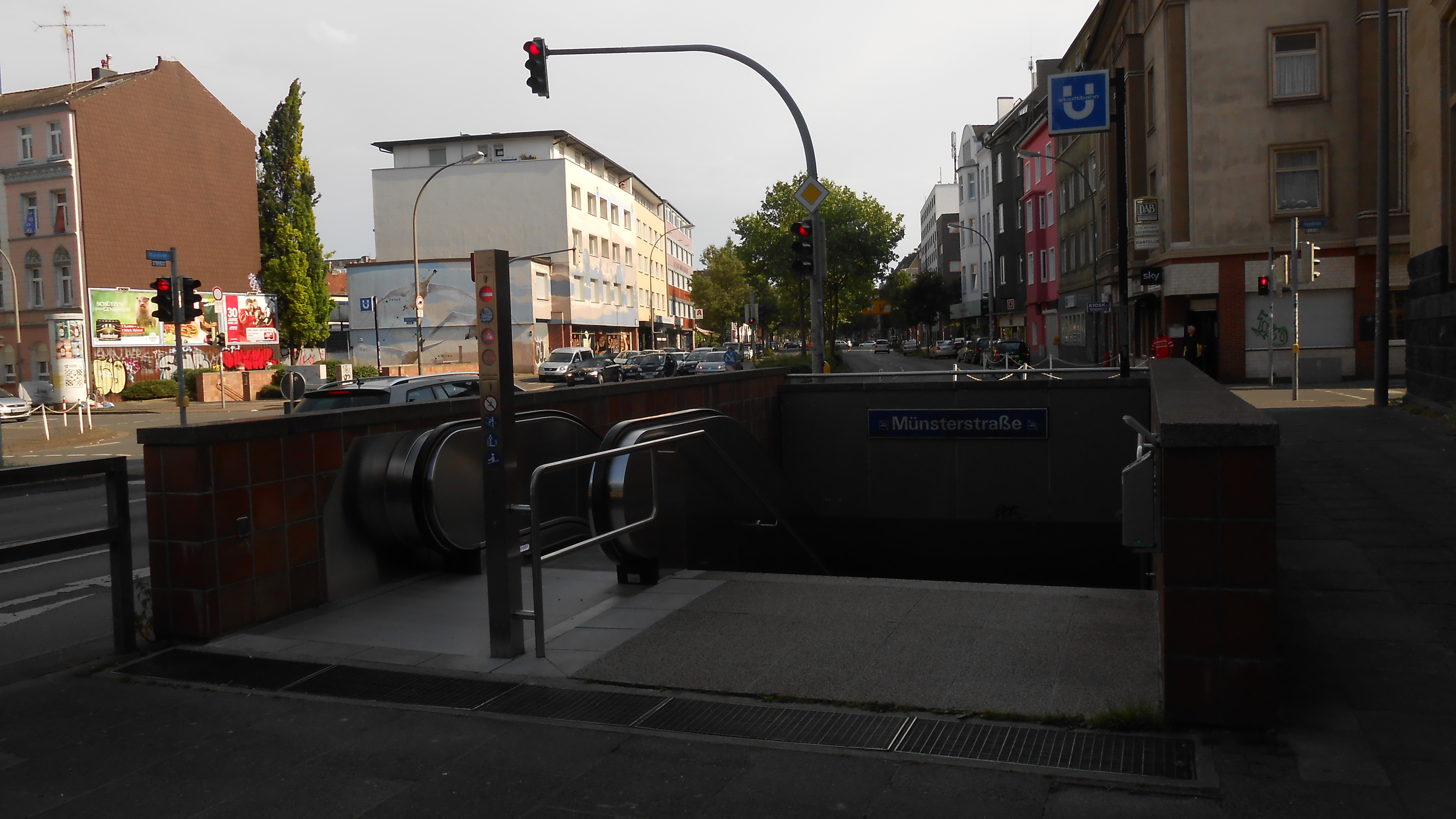
Münsterstraße metro station, with beginning of the street in background

The public festival Münsterstraßenfest takes place once a year. In 2015, it celebrated its 17th year.

In recent years, the street has increasingly gained a reputation as "problematic," because of the rise in crime and the increased presence of drug dealers.

On the other hand, people living there claim the situation is exaggerated in the local press and by politicians; these people enjoy the diversity, the young population, and the multicultural aspect of the area, characteristics which, they say, are mentioned by the press too little.
