= Gaza plan =

Gaza plan or Gaza peace plan may refer to:

- Gaza plan of the 1949 Lausanne Conference
- Israeli disengagement from the Gaza Strip, the 2005 dismantling of all Israeli settlements in Gaza
- 2020 Israel–Palestine peace plan
- January 2025 Gaza war ceasefire, an Israel–Hamas agreement
- 2025 Donald Trump Gaza Strip takeover proposal
- 2025 New York Declaration, a resolution passed by the United Nations General Assembly
- Gaza peace plan, an October 2025 Israel–Hamas agreement that aims to address the Gaza war

== See also ==
- Gaza ceasefire
- Gaza war (disambiguation)
- Gaza–Israel clashes
- Gaza crisis
- Invasion of Gaza
- Battle of Gaza
- Siege of Gaza
