= Battle of Gadara =

Battle in 93 BC

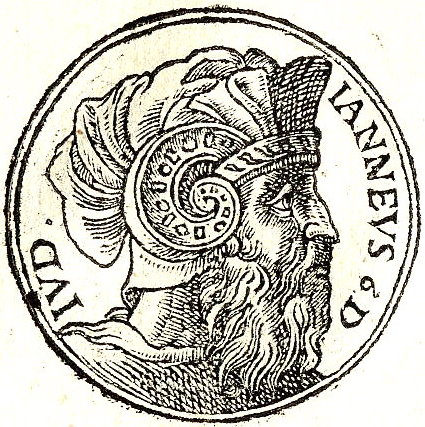
- Alexander Jannaeus minted on a coin.
Date	93 BC
Location	Gadara, Transjordan 32.650000°N 35.683333°E
Result	Nabataean victory
Territorial changes	Loss of territories in Transjordan previously gained by the Hasmoneans to the Nabataeans

Belligerents
Hasmonean dynasty	Nabataean Kingdom

Commanders and leaders
Alexander Jannaeus	Obodas I

Strength
unknown	unknown

Casualties and losses
Entire army lost/killed	unknown, but negligibly low
- Location within Jordan

Battle of Gadara was fought between the Judaean Hasmoneans and the Arab Nabataeans around 93 BC in Gadara in modern-day Jordan.

The battle came after the Nabataeans felt threatened by the Hasmonean King Alexander Jannaeus's territorial acquisitions of Gaza and several towns north of Nabataea in Transjordan, along the road to Damascus where the Greek Seleucids were stationed (the Seleucids were in terminal decline at the time).

Jannaeus was "lucky to escape alive" back to Jerusalem after the Nabataean king Obodas I managed to ambush his forces on a steep hill, thought to be the hills surrounding the Yarmouk River. Jannaeus returned to fierce Jewish opposition in Jerusalem after his defeat, and had to cede the acquired territories to the Nabataeans so that he could dissuade them from supporting his opponents in Judea.

== Background ==
The Nabataeans had maintained a friendly relationship with the neighboring Jewish Maccabees to the west, whose successors founded the Hasmonean dynasty. Alexander Jannaeus, the Hasmonean king, had besieged and captured Gaza around 100 BC. Jannaeus is thought to have punished the Gazans for their support to the Greek Ptolemies in Egypt over the Hasmoneans during their wars. Jannaeus then continued his father John Hyrcanus's conquests in Transjordan, where he captured Gadara, Amathus, Moab and Gilead.

The Nabataeans felt threatened by these acquisitions as they had obstructed their access to the Port of Gaza, which was the last stop for goods that came from Nabataea before being shipped to European markets. The acquisition of Transjordanian towns laid another threat to Nabataean interests, and to the Seleucids in Damascus too.

== Battle ==
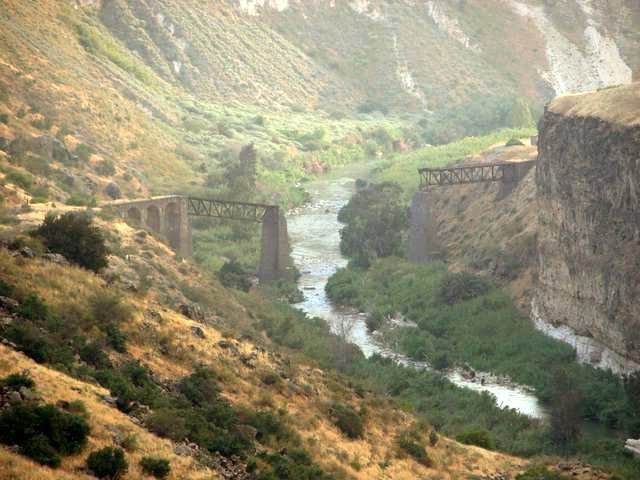
View of the Yarmouk River.

After the death of the Nabataean king Aretas II in 96 BC, his son Obodas I rose to power. Around 93 BC, Obodas managed to ambush Jannaeus and his forces in a hilly area where Jannaeus was "lucky to escape alive". The Nabataean army used a large number of camels to push the Hasmonean forces deep into a valley. The area surrounding the Yarmouk River is thought to be the location of this engagement.

== Aftermath ==
Jannaeus returned to fierce Jewish opposition in Jerusalem after his defeat, and had to cede the acquired territories to the Nabataeans so that he could dissuade them from supporting his opponents in Judea.

The Seleucids, based in Syria, were concerned with the growing influence of the Nabataeans, who now controlled the territories just to their south. In 87 BC, the Seleucid king Antiochus XII Dionysus waged the Battle of Cana against the Nabataeans in Gadara. Antiochus was slain during combat, demoralizing his army and turning the battle into a decisive Nabataean victory. The Seleucid army fled and largely perished from starvation in the desert afterwards.

After Obodas's victories over the Hasmoneans and the Seleucids, he became the first Nabataean king to be worshipped as a god by the Nabataean people. In Avdat, in the Negev desert, a temple was built by the Nabataeans to commemorate Obodas. Inscriptions have been found inside referring to "Obodas the god".

== See also ==
- Hasmonean conquest of Gaza
- Battle of Cana between the Seleucids and the Nabataeans (84 BC)
- Battle of Yarmouk at a nearby site; between the Rashidun Caliphate and the Byzantine Empire (636 CE)
