= Lebanon War =

The term Lebanon War can refer to:

- Lebanese Civil War (1975–1990), including:
  - Hundred Days' War (1978)
  - 1978 South Lebanon conflict (first Israeli invasion of Lebanon)
  - 1982 Lebanon War (second Israeli invasion of Lebanon. Also called the "First Lebanon War" in Israel)
  - Mountain War (1983–1984)
  - War of the Camps (1985–1988)
- South Lebanon conflict (1982–2000)
- 2006 Lebanon War (third Israeli invasion of Lebanon. Also called the "Second Lebanon War" in Israel)
- 2007 Lebanon conflict (internal conflict)
- 2008 Lebanon conflict (internal conflict)
- Syrian civil war spillover in Lebanon (2011–2017)
- Israel–Hezbollah conflict (2023–present)
  - 2024 Lebanon war (fourth Israeli invasion of Lebanon)
  - 2026 Lebanon war (fifth Israeli invasion of Lebanon)

== See also ==
- Israel–Syria incident (disambiguation)
- 1860 civil conflict in Mount Lebanon and Damascus
- Gaza War
- Israeli invasion of Lebanon
