= Judean Civil War =

Conflict in the Hasmonean Kingdom, 93–87 BCE

- Part of the Pharisee–Sadducee conflict
Date	93–87 BCE
Location	Hasmonean Judea
Result	See aftermath

Belligerents
Sadducees	Pharisees: Seleucid Empire (89–88 BCE)

Commanders and leaders
Alexander Jannaeus	Joshua ben Perachiah; Simeon ben Shetach; Demetrius III Eucaerus

Casualties and losses
Unknown	800 executed

A civil war erupted in Hasmonean Judea during the reign of King and High Priest Alexander Jannaeus (r. 103–76 BCE), pitting him against the Pharisees and other domestic opponents. According to Josephus, open revolt began during the pilgrimage festival of Sukkot, when worshippers in the Jerusalem Temple pelted Jannaeus with citrons and palm branches while he performed sacrifices; some in the crowd then accused his mother of having been a captive, and therefore him of being unfit for the high priesthood according to Jewish priestly laws.

The conflict escalated into a six-year civil war following Jannaeus's defeat at the hands of the Nabatean king Obodas I, which emboldened his domestic opponents. The rebels appealed to the Seleucid king Demetrius III Eucaerus, who joined forces with them and defeated Jannaeus at Shechem, killing his entire mercenary force and driving him into the mountains. His invasion nonetheless collapsed when many of the rebels defected back to Jannaeus; it is also possible that Demetrius withdrew to defend his capital Damascus from a dynastic rival, Philip II Philadelphus.

Jannaeus crushed the remaining resistance, capturing the town of Bethoma and transporting his captives to Jerusalem, where, according to Josephus, he crucified 800 of them and had their wives and children killed before their eyes. The sectarian Nahum Commentary, composed by the Qumran community (probably Essenes), may preserve an independent witness to these events. It mentions a figure called the "Lion of Wrath" who hanged the "Seekers-after-smooth-things" (probably the Pharisees) as retribution for their appeal to "Demetrius king of Greece". Additionally, a sealed cistern excavated at the Russian Compound in central Jerusalem contained the remains of at least 124 people, many bearing signs of decapitation and trauma consistent with organized massacre, dated to the late 2nd or early 1st century BCE.

The war's legacy shaped the remainder of Hasmonean history. On his deathbed in 76 BCE, Jannaeus reportedly advised his wife and successor, Salome Alexandra, to reconcile with the Pharisees. Alexandra's nine-year reign reversed the policies of her husband's policies: she restored Pharisaic religious law, dismantled Sadducean control over the Temple cult, and elevated the Pharisees to an unprecedented degree of political influence. The settlement she achieved, however, proved fragile. Upon her death in 67 BCE, her sons Hyrcanus II, who was seemingly aligned with the Pharisees, and Aristobulus II, who retained the support of his father's Sadducean circle, entered into a succession dispute that escalated into civil war. The subsequent Roman intervention resulted in Pompey's conquest of Jerusalem in 63 BCE and the incorporation of Judea as a client state of Rome.

== Background ==
Alexander Jannaeus ascended the Hasmonean throne following the death of his brother, Judah Aristobulus I, c. 103 BCE, and continued the military campaigns initiated by their father, John Hyrcanus, to expand the borders of Judea. His early reign was consumed by military campaigns along the Mediterranean coast and in Transjordan, including involvement in the so-called "War of the Scepters," a regional conflict between rival claimants to the Ptolemaic and Seleucid thrones.

If Josephus's record of a six-year internal conflict is reliable, the Hasmonean conquest of Gaza in 96/95 BCE likely marked the start of domestic opposition to Jannaeus.

=== Causes ===
Atkinson argues that the high number of casualties in Jannaeus's campaigns "undoubtedly contributed to the opposition against him", yet he admits that "Josephus does not mention conscription". Historian Eyal Regev argues that Pharisaic opposition to Jannaeus was fundamentally religious rather than political. The Pharisees contested his fitness for the high priesthood on grounds of halakha (Jewish religious law), citing rumors about his mother's lineage that could disqualify him from the highest priestly role, and clashed with him directly over ritual practice. That their concern was not with royal power or military policy is demonstrated, in Regev's view, by their subsequent cooperation with Salome Alexandra, who maintained equally aggressive foreign policies but deferred to Pharisaic halakhah.

== The Tabernacles incident ==
Both Antiquities of the Jews and The Jewish War record that the conflict ignited during the Sukkot (the Feast of Tabernacles), one of Judaism's three pilgrimage festivals. In Antiquities of the Jews (13:372), Josephus specifies that the violence erupted while Jannaeus was performing sacrifices in the Jerusalem Temple in his capacity as High Priest; the worshipping crowd pelted the king with citrons (etrogim) and palm-branch wands (lulavim), which are among the four species used as part of the Sukkot service. Josephus wrote that some worshippers leveled the accusation that Jannaeus's mother had once been a captive. They argued that this rendered him unfit for the high priesthood, as she would likely have been raped during her captivity, which would technically make Jannaeus a bastard under the biblical laws governing the priesthood. According to the Book of Leviticus (21:4), a priest could not marry a woman who had engaged in sexual relations under certain disqualifying circumstances, and their offspring were barred from the priesthood. (Note: This is elaborated upon in the Mishnah, Ketubot 2:9.)

The accusation that a Hasmonean ruler was illegitimate because his mother had been a captive is also mentioned earlier by Josephus in Antiquities (13.292), as voiced against Jannaeus's grandfather, John Hyrcanus, by a Pharisee named Eleazar during a feast with other Pharisees. On this basis, Atkinson suggests that this "could indicate that Josephus did not know which Hasmonean was the object of this accusation," adding that such a claim may have been merely a slander sometimes used against the dynasty. Grabbe writes that this accusation "sounds more like a pretext than the true reason".

The Mishnah (Sukkah 4:9) mentions a priest who poured the customary libation over his feet, rather onto the altar; in response, the outraged crowd pelted him with their citrons (etrogim). A similar narrative appears in the later Talmuds (Babylonian Talmud, Yoma 26b and Sukkah 48b; Jerusalem Talmud, Sukkah 4:8, 54d), which identifies this priest as a Sadducee; in the Tosefta (Sukkah 3:16) he is a Bethousian. These accounts appear to be independent sources for the Jannaeus pelting episode (though they do not explicitly mention him), and they suggest that Jannaeus, aligning himself with Sadducean tradition, deliberately provoked the Pharisees during this high-profile public ceremony.

According to Talmudic scholar Jeffrey L. Rubenstein, the rabbinic version likely originated as an adaptation of Josephus's story. He argues that the rabbis reshaped the episode to serve their own concerns, transforming Josephus's account of popular anger at Jannaeus's cruelty into a dispute over the proper performance of the water libation ritual. He notes that examples of pelting with citrons are attested elsewhere in rabbinic literature: in the Babylonian Talmud, Rabbi Zeira is pelted with citrons by the people of Mahoza, while a midrash (late-antique rabbinic exegesis) describes a man whose gifts to Hadrian are thrown back at him by soldiers; he later remarks that had he brought citrons instead, they would have pelted him even more severely. Historian Gedaliah Alon, citing the story of Rabbi Zeira, argued that the etrog-pelting episodes involving Jannaeus in Josephus and rabbinic literature refer to two different events, explaining that pelting someone with etrogim was a common form of insult during the period.

Rabbinic traditions also preserve a story in which the Pharisees, too, tell Jannaeus that his mother had been taken captive, paralleling a similar account in Josephus involving John Hyrcanus I instead. Talmudic scholar Vered Noam argues that this tradition preserves an early Pharisaic polemical work.

== Escalation and foreign intervention ==
Following this episode, Jannaeus turned eastward, campaigning in Moab and Gilead, but suffered a defeat at the hands of Obodas I, king of the Nabateans; According to Lester L. Grabbe, this defeat emboldened Jannaeus's internal foes, transforming previous episodes of domestic conflict into a full-scale, six-year civil war.

After Jannaeus succeeded early in the war, the rebels relocated to Sepphoris, in the heavily pro-Pharisee region of Galilee, and appealed for Seleucid assistance. Judean insurgents joined forces with Demetrius III Eucaerus to fight against Alexander. Demetrius may have been motivated by a desire for retribution following undocumented raids by Jannaeus in the region of Damascus, carried out in the preceding years to exploit the instability then gripping the Seleucid Empire.

Jannaeus had gathered six thousand two hundred mercenaries and twenty thousand Jews for battle, while Demetrius had forty thousand soldiers and three thousand horses. There were attempts from both sides to persuade each other to abandon their positions, but they were unsuccessful. The Seleucid forces defeated Jannaeus at Shechem, and all of Jannaeus's mercenaries were killed in battle. This defeat forced Jannaeus to take refuge in the mountains.

According to Josephus, many of the Jews who had invited Demetrius now deserted him, with 6,000 rallying to Jannaeus. It is possible that the prospect of a Seleucid advance on Jerusalem may have been intolerable even to Jannaeus's opponents. Demetrius's withdrawal was likely further compelled by the need to defend his capital, Damascus, from an invasion by his brother Philip I Philadelphus, a rival claimant to the Seleucid throne who held power in northern Syria.

== Mass executions in Jerusalem ==
Following Demetrius's retreat, Jannaeus moved to crush the remaining local resistance, driving many of his opponents into the city of Bethoma (referred to as Bemeselis in The Jewish War) and capturing it. Its exact location is unknown, though it is thought to lie somewhere northeast of Samaria. According to Josephus, Jannaeus transported his captives to Jerusalem, where he crucified 800 of them and had their wives and children killed before their eyes while he feasted with his concubines. Josephus records that the Jews bestowed upon Jannaeus the sobriquet Thrakidas in response to this act of extreme cruelty; the name, an allusion to the Thracians, most likely denoted barbarity, though it may also reflect the presence of Thracian soldiers among his mercenaries. Some of 8,000 of Jannaeus's opponents reportedly fled the country by night in fear of Alexander; they remained in exile for the remainder of his reign.

=== In Pesher Nahum ===
Jannaeus' mass execution of his political opponents appears to be reflected in two sectarian texts from Qumran, the Judaean Desert site widely identified with the Essenes: the biblical commentaries Pesher Nahum (4Q169) and Pesher Hosea (4Q167). Pesher Nahum interprets Nahum 2:12–13 as a reference to a figure called the "Lion of Wrath" who hangs the "Seekers-after-smooth-things" (דורשי החלקות), a polemical epithet widely taken to denote the Pharisees, as retribution for their appeal to "Demetrius king of Greece," identified with Demetrius III. Pesher Hosea offers a related interpretation of Hosea 5:14, identifying "Ephraim" as the Pharisees and "Judah" as the Qumran sect itself. In this text, Jannaeus is once again likened to a lion, and his actions against the Pharisees are condemned as "prey actions." Both pesharim are commonly viewed as sectarian responses to the Judean civil war and support the portrayal of Jannaeus as a ruler who violently repressed internal opposition.

=== Archaeological evidence ===
Archaeological excavations at the modern-day Russian Compound in Jerusalem uncovered a sealed water cistern containing the remains of at least 124 people, including men, women, children, and fetuses. Many of the skeletons exhibited signs of decapitation and sharp-force trauma, with no evidence of resistance. The assemblage was dated to the late second or early first century BCE, within the reign of Alexander Jannaeus. The excavators have interpreted the findings as evidence of an organized massacre, possibly carried out by Jannaeus during the civil war against the Pharisees. The demographic profile and nature of the trauma suggest deliberate execution of civilians.

== Aftermath and legacy ==
Alexander Jannaeus died in 76 BCE after a 27-year reign, naming his wife Salome Alexandra as his successor. This choice handed the monarchy to a queen governing on fundamentally different terms. In an account found in Josephus's Antiquities but absent from The Jewish War, on his deathbed, Jannaeus advised Salome Alexandra to cede a measure of power to the Pharisees and to distance herself from his own conduct. (Note: The deathbed speech, as Steve Mason and Kenneth Atkinson have noted, bears evidence of Josephus's rhetorical style and was in all likelihood composed by him.) He also counseled her to permit the Pharisees to treat his corpse with contempt, calculating that they would respond to this gesture by granting him an honorable funeral instead. In doing so, he effectively acknowledged that his persecution of the Pharisees had been a source of political instability and a threat to Hasmonean continuity.

Alexandra's nine-year reign proved among the most consequential in Hasmonean history, what Kenneth Atkinson calls "the most unique period of the Hasmonean monarchy ... and the final glorious period of the Hasmonean state." She aligned with the Pharisees, restoring their religious laws following their suppression under John Hyrcanus and dismantling the Sadducean dominance over the Temple cult that had defined her husband's reign. As a result, the Pharisees attained political influence unprecedented in the Hasmonean period, and moved swiftly to settle accounts with those who had counseled Jannaeus's mass executions. Alexandra appointed her elder son Hyrcanus II as high priest, and he appears to have been aligned with the Pharisees as well. Her younger son Aristobulus II, who had remained close to his father's Sadducean circle, became the nucleus of opposition to her government. Later, upon her death in 67 BCE, the succession dispute between the two escalated into a civil war, which ultimately drew in Pompey's intervention and resulted in Judea becoming a client state of Rome.

== See also ==
- List of Jewish civil wars
