= Blockade of Gaza =

Blockade of Gaza may refer to:

- Blockade of the Gaza Strip (2005–present), by Israel and Egypt
- 2006–2007 economic sanctions against the Palestinian National Authority, including blockade
- Israeli blockade of the Gaza Strip (2023–present)

== See also ==
- Siege of Gaza (disambiguation)
- Gaza war (disambiguation)
