= Israeli invasion of Lebanon =

Israeli invasion of Lebanon may refer to any of the following events in the Arab–Israeli conflict:

- 1978 South Lebanon conflict, an invasion of Lebanon up to the Litani River by Israel during the Lebanese Civil War
- 1982 Lebanon War, an Israeli invasion of southern Lebanon
- Operation Accountability, a week-long Israeli military offensive against Hezbollah in July 1993
- Operation Grapes of Wrath, an Israeli military offensive against Hezbollah in April 1996
- 2006 Lebanon War, an Israeli military offensive against Hezbollah
- 2024 Lebanon war, an Israeli military offensive against Hezbollah
- 2026 Lebanon war, an Israeli military offensive against Hezbollah

== See also ==
- Lebanon War (disambiguation)
- Israel–Hezbollah war (disambiguation)
- List of wars involving Israel
- List of wars involving Lebanon
