= Battle of Gaza =

Battle of Gaza may refer to:

- Battle of Gaza (312 BC), between Egypt and Macedon
- Battle of Gaza (96/94 BC), between Hasmonean Judea and Gaza/Nabateans
- Battle of Gaza (1239), between the Crusaders and the Ayyubids
- Mongol raids into Palestine (1260–1300), including Gaza City
- First Battle of Gaza (26 March 1917), an Ottoman victory over the British
- Second Battle of Gaza (19 April 1917), an Ottoman victory over the British
- Third Battle of Gaza (1–2 November 1917), a British victory over the Ottomans
- Battle of Gaza (2007), intra-Palestinian fighting between Fatah and Hamas
- Israeli invasion of the Gaza Strip (2023–present), between Israel and the Palestinian militant group Hamas
  - Siege of Gaza City, between Israel and the Palestinian militant group Hamas

== See also ==
- Battle of Rafah (disambiguation)
  - Battle of Rafah (2009)
- Invasion of Gaza (disambiguation)
- Gaza war (disambiguation)
- Gaza–Israel clashes (disambiguation)
- Gaza crisis (disambiguation)
