= Gaza crisis =

The Gaza crisis may relate to the following events:

- Gaza Strip under Hamas § 2012 fuel crisis
- 2021 Israel–Palestine crisis
- Gaza war hostage crisis
- Gaza humanitarian crisis

== See also ==
- Gaza war (disambiguation)
- Battle of Gaza
- Gaza–Israel clashes
- Invasion of Gaza
