= Battle of Cana =

Battle in 84 BC

- Part of Nabataean-Seleucid War
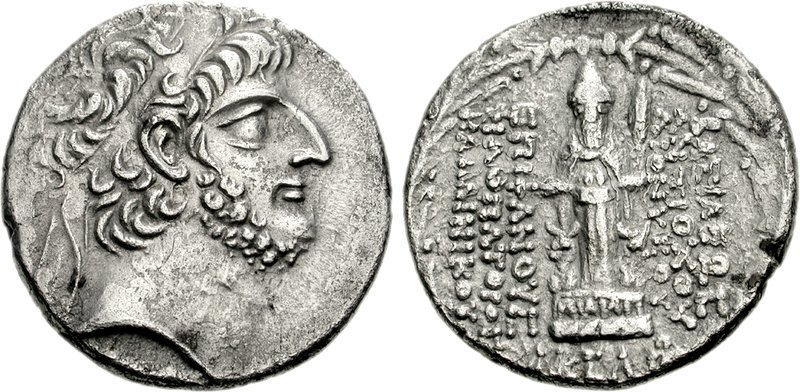
- Minted Greek coins showing Antiochus XII
Date	84 BC
Location	Cana, the Dead Sea
Result	Nabataean victory

Belligerents
Seleucid Empire	Nabataean Kingdom

Commanders and leaders
Antiochus XII †	Obodas I (DOW); Aretas III

Strength
Unknown	Large Arab army with a reserve force of 10,000 horses

Casualties and losses
Most of the army dead • Majority of surviving soldiers starved to death while attempting to cross Judea	Unknown / Minimal

The Battle of Cana was fought between Greek Seleucid Empire under king Antiochus XII Dionysus, and the Arab Nabataean Kingdom. Cana is an unknown village; scholars place it somewhere south or southwest of the Dead Sea.

After the Nabataeans ambushed the Judaean Hasmoneans in a steep valley, they gained new territories, and the Greek Seleucids stationed in Damascus felt threatened by the rising power of the Nabataeans to their south.

Antiochus was slain during the combat and the battle became a decisive Nabataean victory. Antiochus's demoralized army fled and perished from starvation in the desert afterwards.

== Background ==
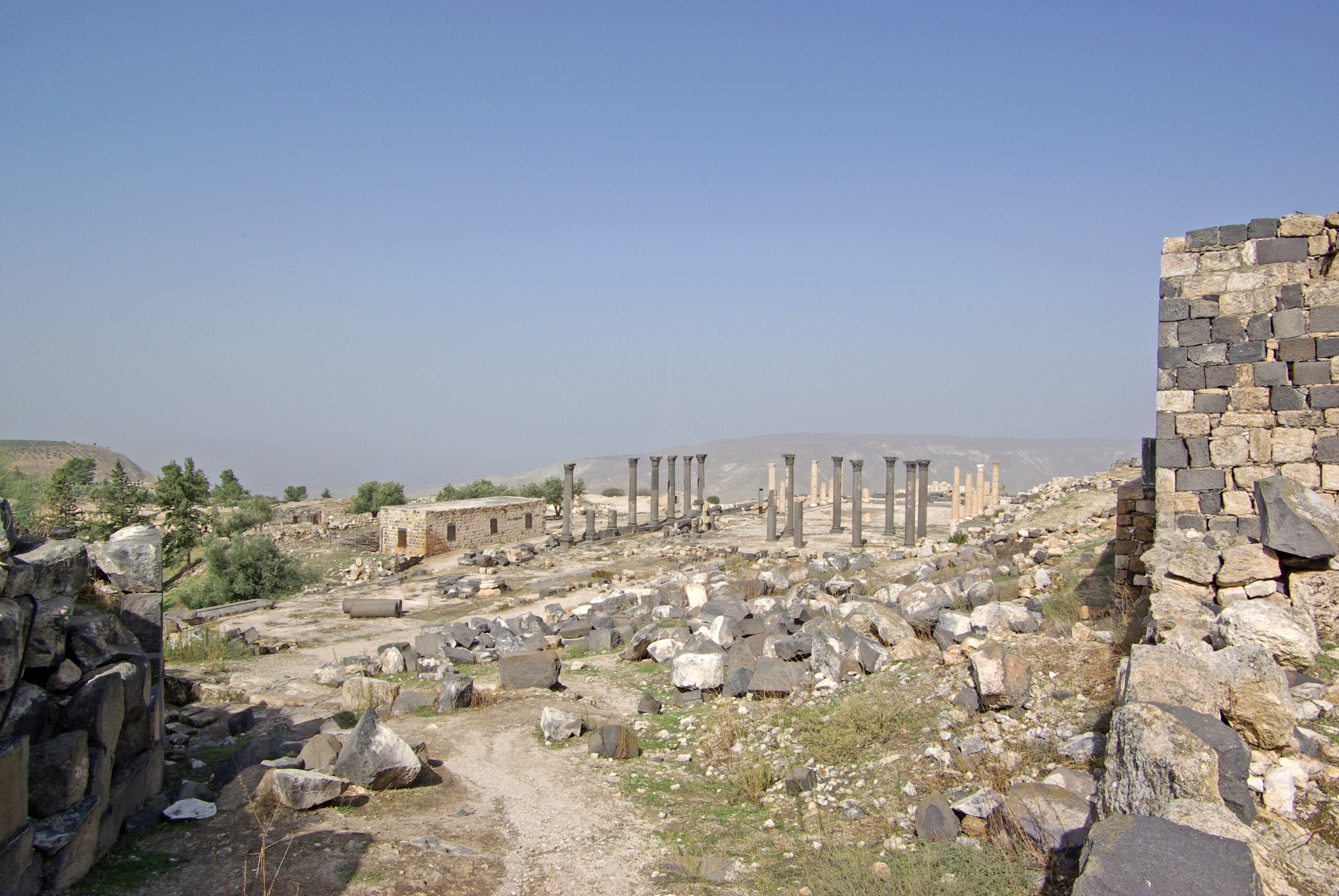
Ruins of Gadara, modern-day Umm Qais in Jordan.

The Port of Gaza was the last stop for spices that were carried by trade caravans from Eudaemon, in today's Yemen, across the Arabian peninsula, passing through Petra and ending up in the Gaza for shipment to European markets. The Nabataean Kingdom had generated considerable wealth from the passing of this trading route through their territory and had considerable influence over the Gazans. The Hasmonean King of Judaea, Alexander Jannaeus, had besieged the city of Gaza around 100 BC. This came after the Gazans had favoured the Ptolemaic Kingdom over the Judaeans in their recent battles. Gaza was occupied and its inhabitants put to the sword by Jannaeus.

The capture of Gaza posed a threat to the Nabataean trade business and altered their previous neutral relationship with the Hasmoneans. The Hasmoneans under Jannaeus launched a campaign that captured several territories in Transjordan north of Nabataea, along the road to Damascus, including northern Moab and Gilead. Although these areas were not under direct control of the Nabataeans, the presence of the Judaeans posed a threat to Nabataean interests as they cut the communications and trade routes to Damascus which was then controlled by the Seleucid Empire. The Nabataean King, Obodas I, with the support of the Seleucid King Demetrius III, fought to restore these areas. Obodas managed to defeat Jannaeus during the Battle of Gadara around 93 BC, when he ambushed him and his forces in a steep valley where Jannaeus "was lucky to escape alive".

== Battle ==
The Nabataeans exploited divisions in the Hasmonean kingdom for their benefit. Janneus had to cede the territories to Obodas in order to dissuade him from supporting his opponents. With these areas now under direct Nabataean control, the Greek Seleucids, at the time in terminal decline, felt threatened and launched two campaigns against the Arabs under Seleucid King Antiochus XII. During the second of them, Antiochus marched along the coast of Judae in order to surprise the Nabataeans.

Although initially successful, the young king was caught in a melee and killed by an Arab soldier. Upon his death the Syrian army fled to an unknown village known as Cana and mostly perished in the desert; the location of the settlement is unknown but many scholars propose a place south of the Dead Sea. Having gained a decisive victory, the Nabateans soon after conquered Damascus.

== Aftermath ==
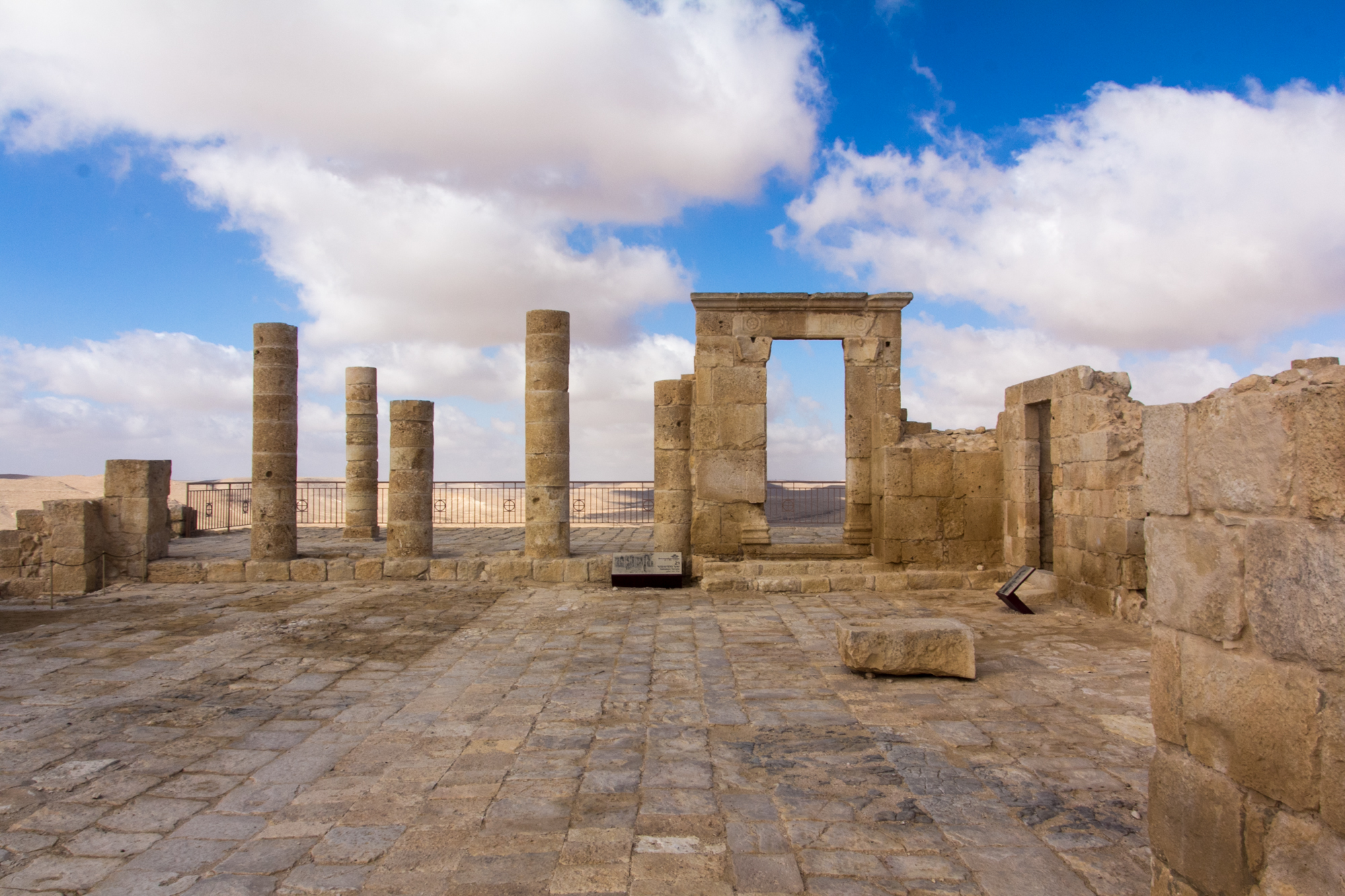
Ruins of Avdat in the Negev.

After Obodas's victories over the Hasmoneans and the Seleucids, he became the first Nabataean king to be worshipped as a god by the Nabataean people. Avdat was a temple built in the Negev desert by the Nabataeans for commemorating Obodas where inscriptions have been found referring to "Obodas the god".

== See also ==
- Antigonid–Nabataean confrontations
