= Rafah massacre =

Rafah massacre may refer to:

- 1956 Rafah massacre
- 12 February 2024 Rafah strikes
- Tel al-Sultan attack
- Rafah paramedic massacre
- Rafah aid distribution killings

== See also ==
- Background of the Rafah offensive
- Rafah offensive
- Gaza massacre
