= Ein Avdat =

Canyon, spring and national park in southern Israel

- עין עבדת
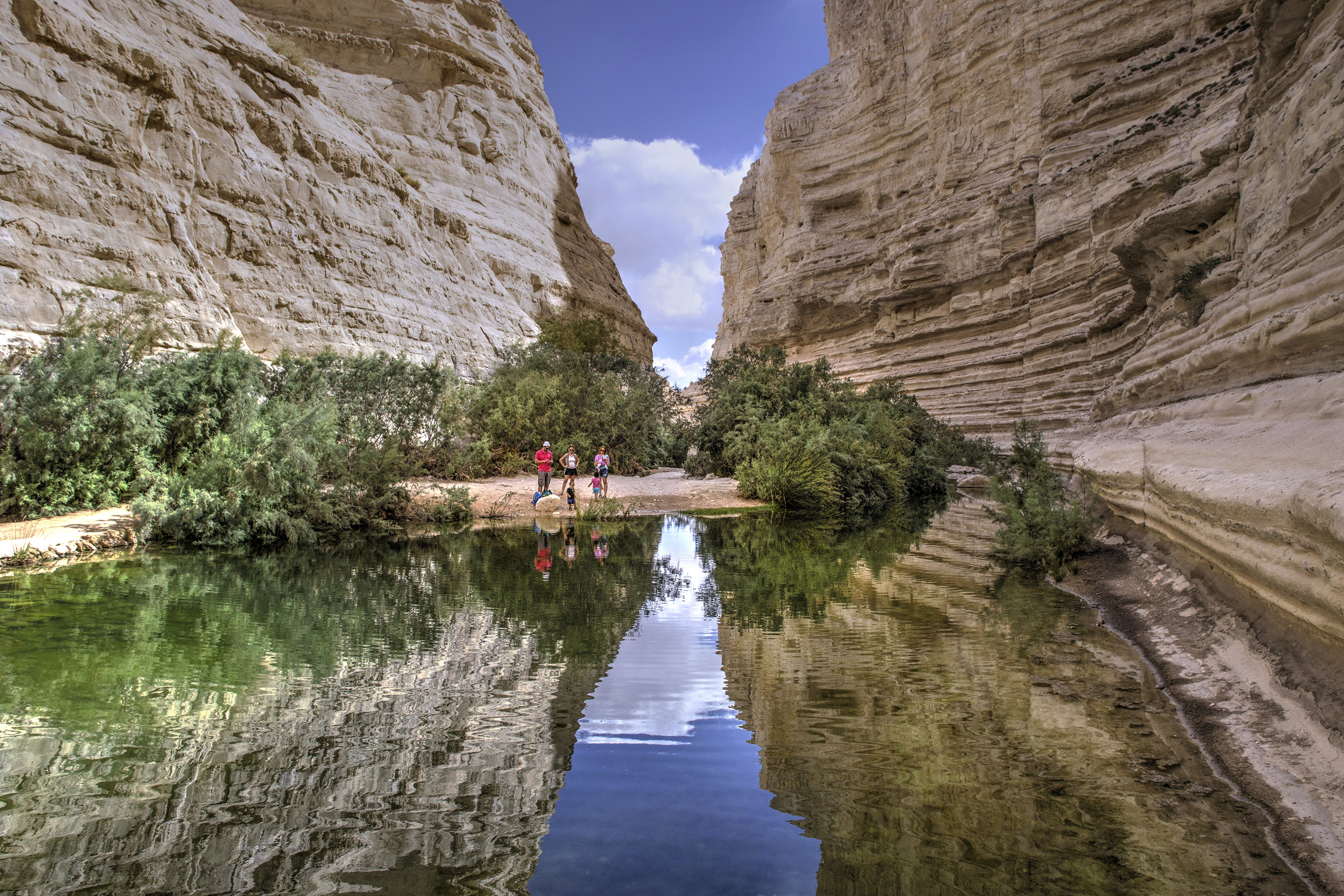
- Pools of Ein Avdat

- Location within Israel
- Length: 5 kilometres (3.1 mi)

Geology
- Type: Canyon

Geography
- Location: Nahal Zin, Negev, Israel
- Coordinates: 30°49′35″N 34°46′0″E
- Interactive map of Ein Avdat

Ein Avdat (Hebrew: עין עבדת) (Arabic: عَيْن عَبْدَة, ʻayn ʻabda Arabic pronunciation: [ʕajn ʕab.da]) or Ein Ovdat is a canyon in the Negev Desert of Israel, south of Kibbutz Sde Boker. Archaeological evidence shows that Ein Avdat was inhabited by Nabateans and Catholic monks. Numerous springs at the southern opening of the canyon empty into deep pools in a series of waterfalls. The water emerges from the rock layers with salt-tolerant plants like Poplar trees and Atriplexes growing nearby.

== Etymology ==
Ein is Arabic and Hebrew for spring or water source. Avdat derives from the nearby city of Avdat that stood south of the canyon. Avdat, formerly Eboda, was named after the Nabataean King Obodas I who, according to tradition, was buried there.

== History ==
=== Prehistoric era ===
Habitation during the prehistoric era is attested to by numerous flint artifacts found in the area believed to be 80,000–90,000 years old and part of Mousterian culture. The flint in the outcrops nearby was utilized for arrows and points. Ostrich egg shells and onager bones shed light on the fauna of the time; some of these remains are approximately 200,000 years old. Man-made knives and other hand held implements date from the Paleolithic and Mesolithic periods. Remains of a small settlement consisting of several round structures dates from the Bronze Age.

=== Antiquity ===
During the Hellenistic period Avdat became a station along the Nabatean Incense Route, an ancient trading route from Egypt to India through the Arabian Peninsula. Agriculture developed during the early Roman era. Forts along the Incense Route developed into thriving cities with many public buildings and farms.

In the Byzantine period, Ein Avdat was inhabited by monks who lived in caves. They carved out closets, shelves, benches, stairs, and water systems, and decorated the walls of the caves with crosses and prayers.

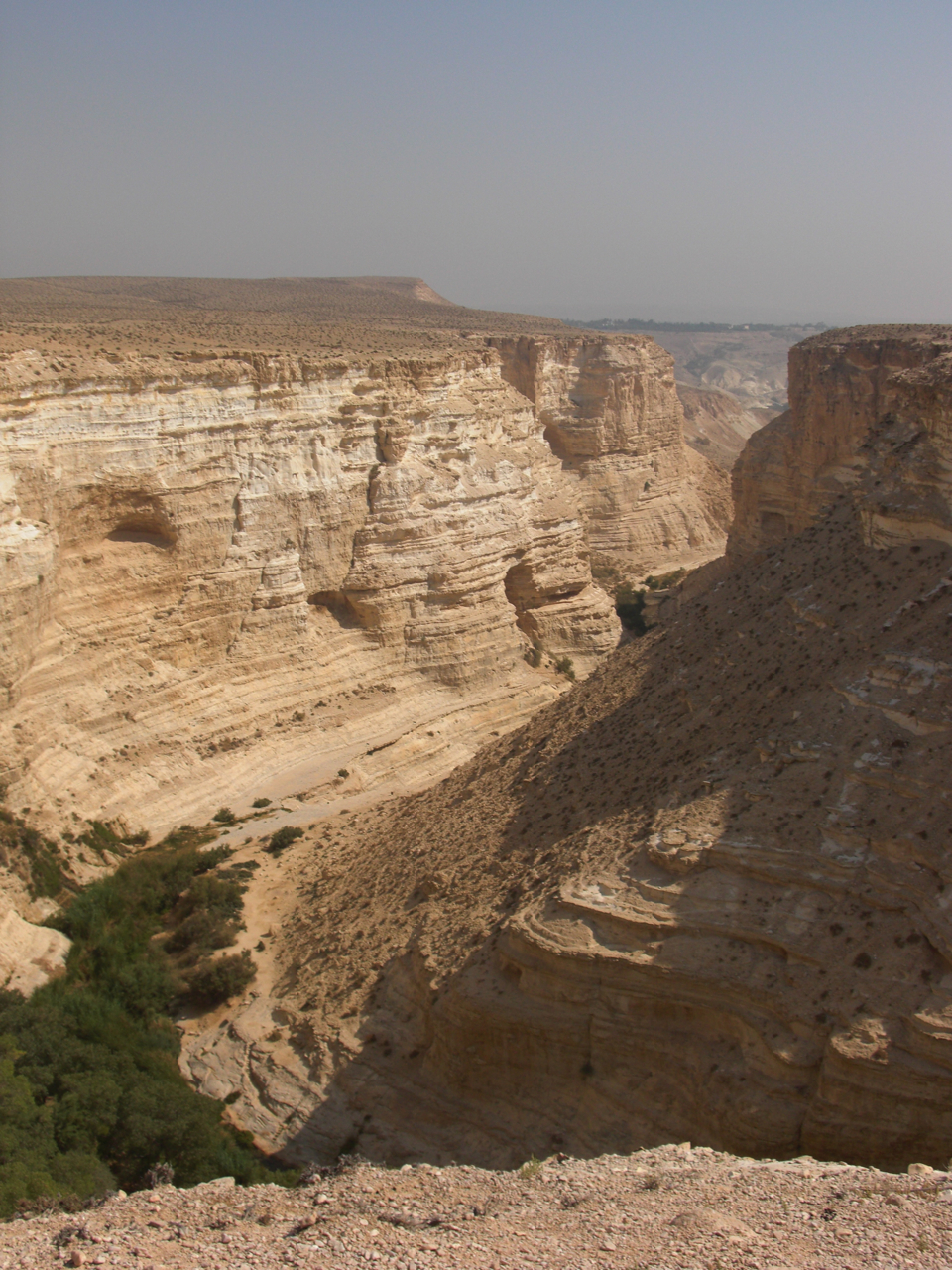
Canyon of Ein Avdat from above

UNESCO, the United Nations Educational, Scientific and Cultural Organization recognizes Avdat as a Heritage Site in part because of the uniqueness of the magnificent Byzantine Church. Maybe dating from the third century (sources are not clear), it is both one of the earliest and one of the best-preserved churches constructed before the recognition of Christianity by the Emperor Constantine. After the Muslim conquest of Palestine, the region was abandoned.

=== Modern era ===
After the establishment of Kibbutz Sde Boker in 1952 and the construction of Highway 40 to Eilat, a hiking trail was created. Ein Avdat has been designated a National Park of Israel and is administered by the Israel Nature and Parks Authority. The modern park is 480 ha in area. Approximately 120 to 500 tourists visited the park each day in 2019.

== Geography ==
Ein Avdat

Climate chart (precipitation, max. and min. temperature)
J	F	M	A	M	J	J	A	S	O	N	D
25 15 4	18 16 5	17 19 7	7.9 25 11	1.1 29 14	0 31 16	0 33 18	0 33 19	0.1 31 17	2 27 14	7.6 22 9	75 17 6
- █ Average max. and min. temperatures in °C
- █ Precipitation totals in mm
- Source: The Israel Meteorological Service
Imperial conversion
J	F	M	A	M	J	J	A	S	O	N	D
1 59 39	0.7 61 41	0.7 66 45	0.3 77 52	0 84 57	0 88 61	0 91 64	0 91 66	0 88 63	0.1 81 57	0.3 72 48	3 63 43
- █ Average max. and min. temperatures in °F
- █ Precipitation totals in inches

The canyon of Ein Avdat is part of Nahal Zin, the largest Wadi or dry riverbed in the Negev. The 120 kilometer-long riverbed begins at the northwestern tip of Makhtesh Ramon and heads north before veering sharply eastwards. Ein Avdat was created by erosion.

=== Springs ===
The southernmost spring is Ein Ma'arif, featuring a series of waterfalls and pools. A Byzantine fortress overlooks the spring and adjacent agricultural land.

Further north is Ein Avdat, a 15-meter high waterfall that flows into an 8-meter deep pool of water divided by a small artificial dam.

Located near the northern entrance of the park is a spring called Ein Mor, named for the spice myrrh.

=== Climate ===
According to statistics compiled by a weather station at Sde Boker, the summers are hot with almost no precipitation while the winters are cold with some rain. The lowest recorded temperature for January was −3.6 °C (25.5 °F). In the summer temperatures can reach over 40 °C (104 °F). The humidity is relatively high.

== Ecology ==
=== Flora ===
Growing around the springs are Euphrates poplar trees and Atriplexes, commonly known as saltbush, which grow on riverbanks and can tolerate salinity. Other riverside plants are tamarisks, salt trees, common reed, lesser bulrush, and sea rush. Maidenhair ferns and lichen are found on moist canyon walls, and algae grows in the water. Shrubs such as bushy bean caper and saltwort grow in dryer areas. A single, large Mt Atlas mastic (pistachio) tree grows near the park entrance. Multiple species of green algae (Chara) grow in the water.

=== Fauna ===
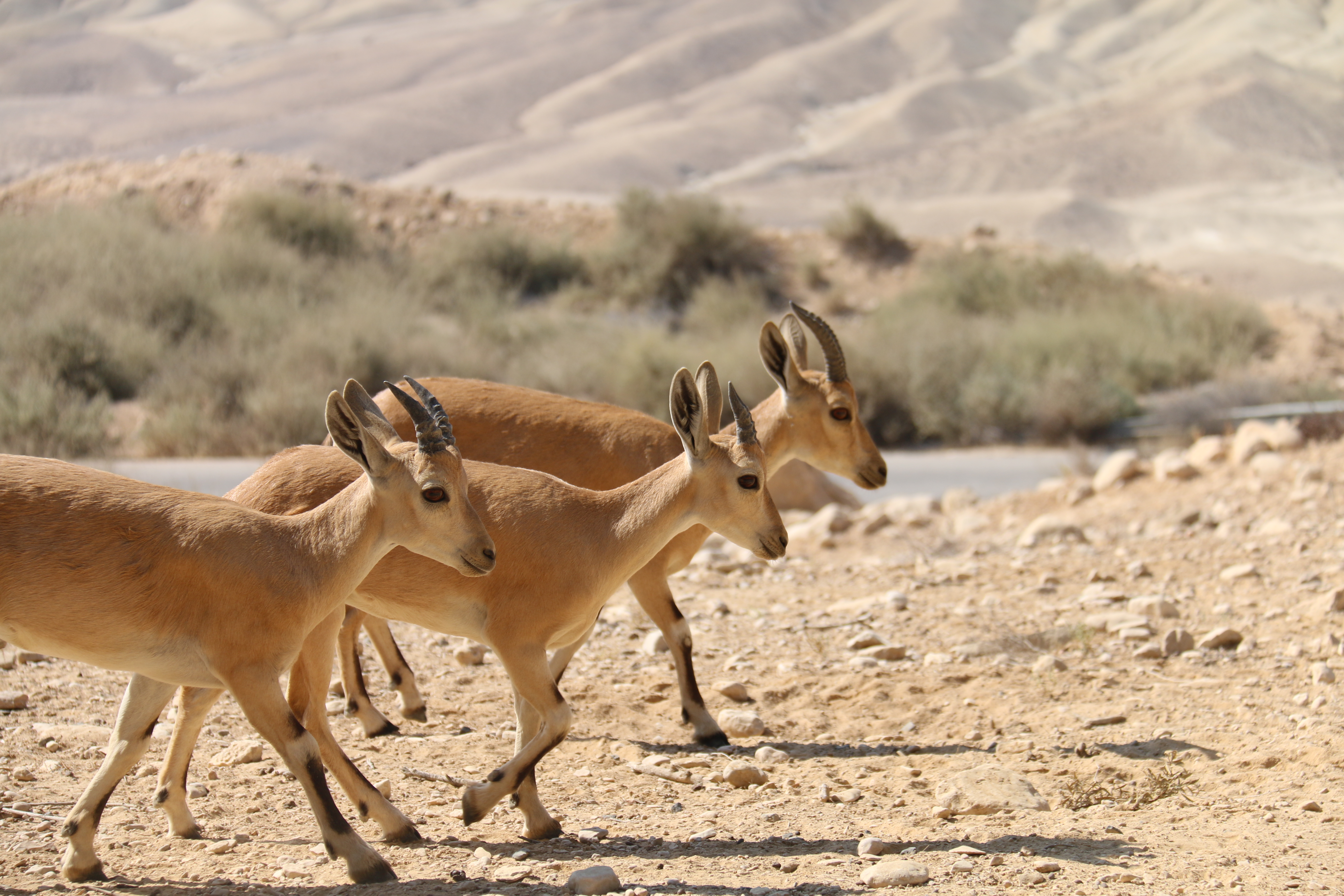
Three Nubian ibex in Ein Avdat

En Avdat is home to mammals such as Nubian ibex, fat sand rats, golden jackals, red foxes, Arabian wolves, striped hyenas, and bats such as Kuhl's pipistrelle. The canyon is an important protected area for griffon vultures and Egyptian vultures, which nest on the cliffs. Other common birds include sand partridge, Arabian babblers, rock martin, Tristram's starling, rock doves, and Bonelli's eagles. In the water live European green toads, Levantine freshwater crabs, and larvae of insects such as Culiseta mosquitoes and desert skimmer dragonflies.

== Gallery ==
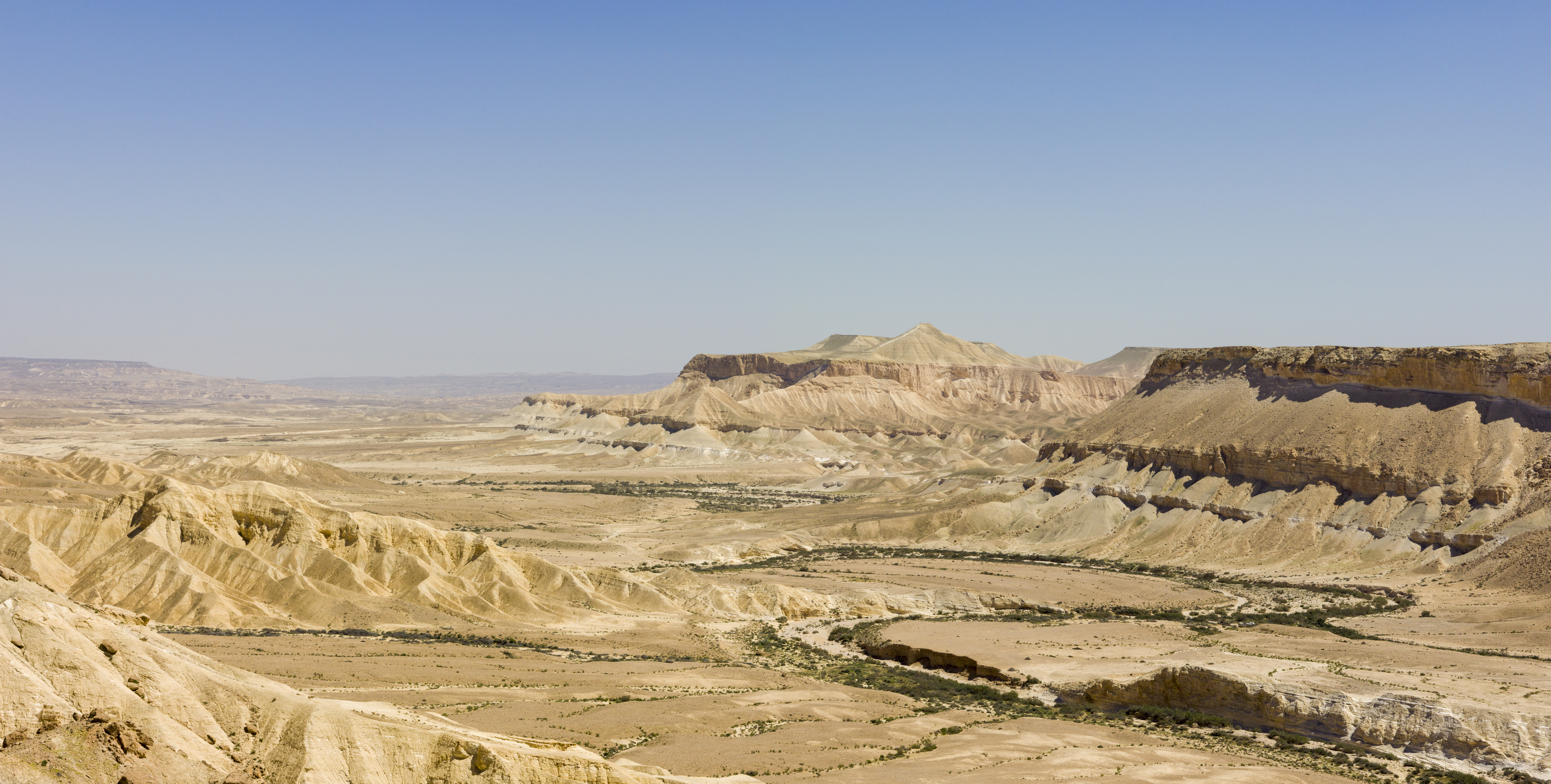
View of Ein Avdat taken near Midreshet Ben-Gurion

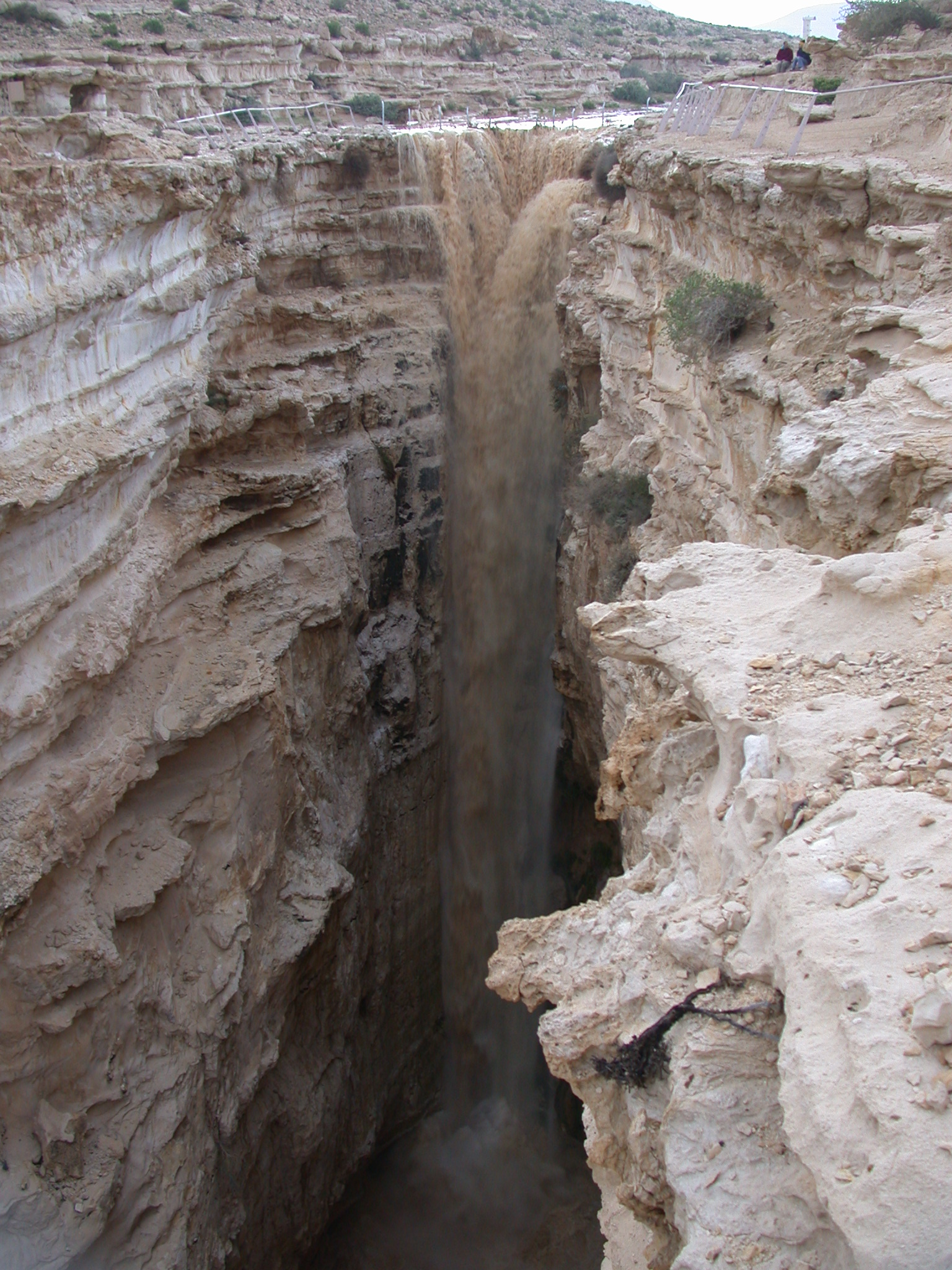
Flash flood in Ein Avdat

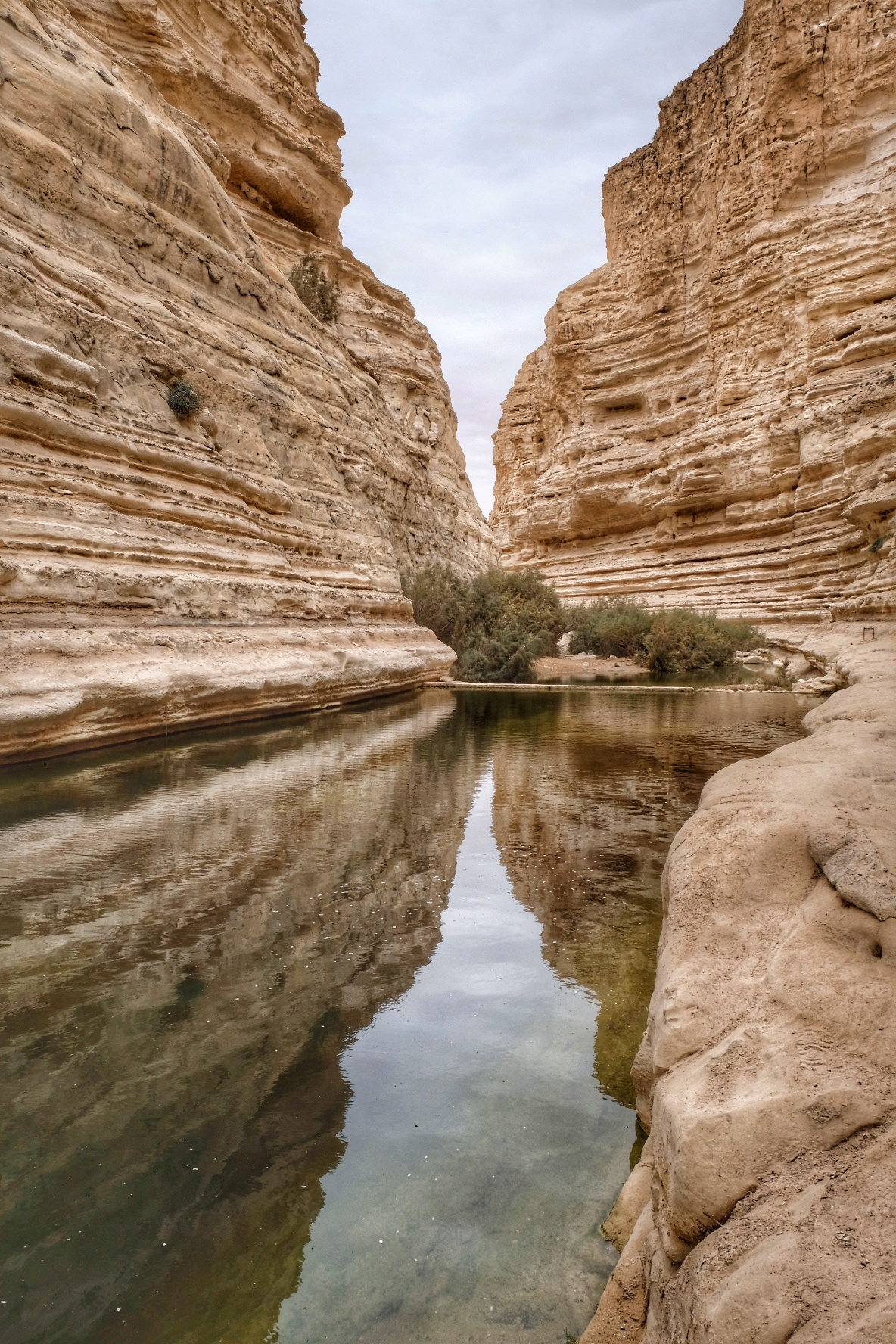
Ein Avdat pools

== See also ==
- Geography of Israel
- Tourism in Israel
- Wildlife in Israel
