= Antigonid–Nabataean confrontations =

Three wars in the 4th century BC

- Part of Third War of the Diadochi
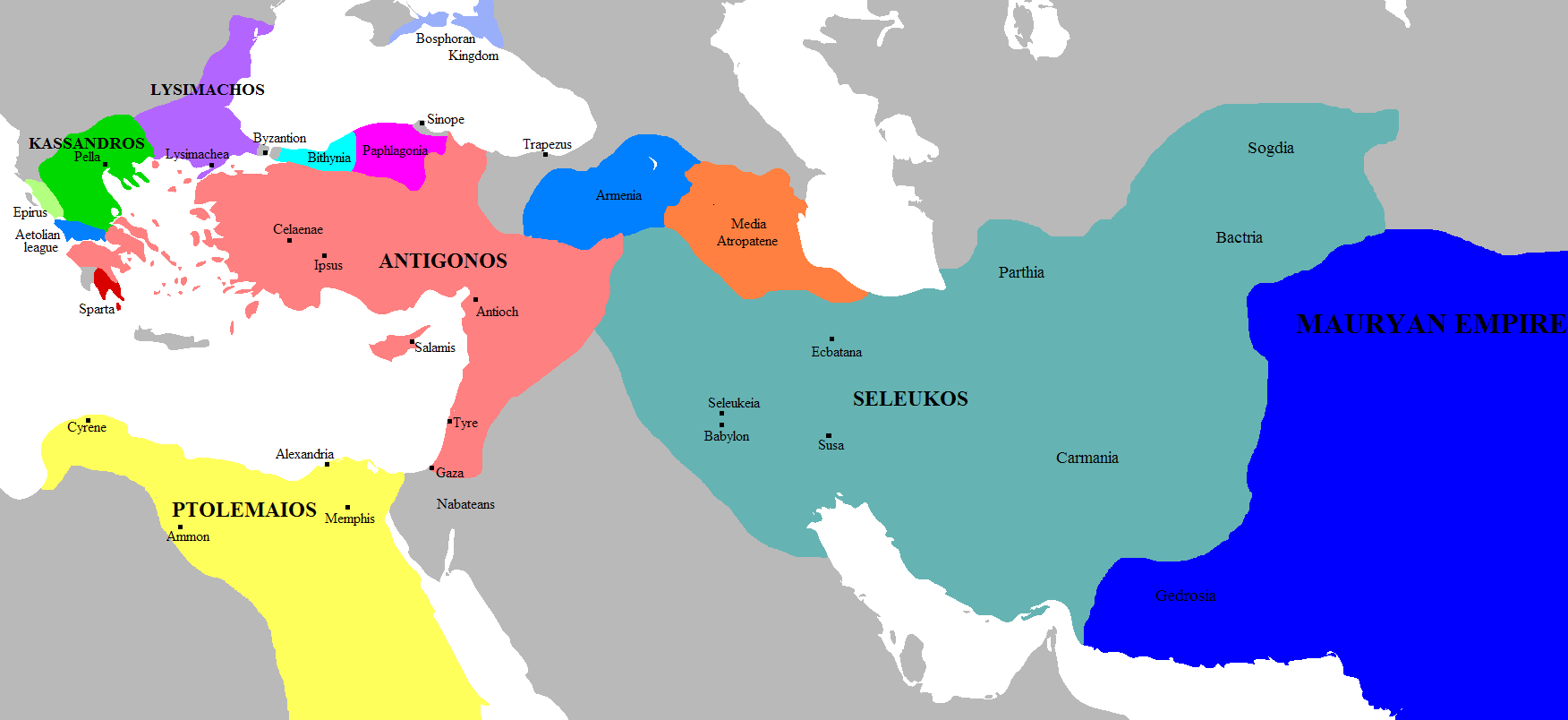
- Map showing the territories controlled by Antigonus and the territory controlled by the Nabataeans around 314 BC
Date	312 BC
Location	Nabataea
Result	Nabataean victory

Belligerents
Antigonids	Nabataeans

Commanders and leaders
Antigonos; Athenaeos; Demetrios; Hieronymos	Unknown

Strength
4,000 infantry, 600 cavalry (first confrontation); 4,000 infantry, 4,000 cavalry (second confrontation) small expedition (third confrontation)	8,000 camel cavalry (first confrontation) unknown (second confrontation); 6,000 infantry (third confrontation)

Casualties and losses
4,550 killed, 40 wounded (first confrontation) few killed (second confrontation) most of expedition killed (third confrontation)	First confrontation: few killed; women and children kidnapped, later freed in Nabataean night attack Second confrontation: unknown Third confrontation: none
- Tons of Nabataean reserves of frankincense, myrrh and silver stolen by the Greeks

The Antigonid–Nabataean confrontations were three confrontations initiated by Greek general Antigonus I against the Arab Nabataeans in 312 BC. Following the death of Alexander the Great in 323 BC, his empire was disputed between his generals, including Antigonus, who for a time controlled the Levant.

Reaching Edom, just north of Petra, Antigonus became aware of the wealth of the Nabataeans, generated from the spice trade caravans. The three raids against the Nabateans either came to nothing or ended in disaster for the Greeks.

== Background ==
After Alexander the Great's death in 323 BC, his empire split among his generals. During the conflict between Alexander's generals, Antigonus I conquered the Levant and this brought him to the borders of Edom, just north of Petra. Antigonus became aware of the wealth of the Nabataeans, a nomadic Arab tribe that lived in the nearby desert region. The source for these events is the Greek historian Diodorus Siculus, who used commentary from one of the Greek generals involved in the confrontations.

The Nabataeans generated wealth from the trade route that passed through their capital, Petra. Frankincense, myrrh and other spices were transported in caravans from Eudaemon, across the Arabian Peninsula, through Petra and into the Port of Gaza for shipment to markets around the Mediterranean Sea. The Nabataeans taxed the caravans and provided protection for which they were paid.

== First confrontation ==
Location of the confrontations in modern-day Jordan.

Antigonus appointed one of his officers, Athenaeus, to attack the Nabataeans and take their herds as booty. Athenaeus marched with 4000 men and 600 horsemen into Petra, Nabataea's stronghold, during the night time while the Nabataean men were away trading. Coming from Judea and after 3 travel days across 160 km, Athenaeus captured the place easily as only women and children were present, and the troops loaded themselves with as much frankincense and myrrh as their animals allowed and stole around 13.7 tonnes of silver.

The Nabataean women and children found they were taken to be sold as slaves. Athenaeus and his troops regrouped as dawn broke and set off for where they came from, making camp around 36 km away, assuming they were safely away from the Nabataeans. Spotted by some nomads while they were leaving, an 8,000 Nabataean camel cavalry force, superior to horses in such a barren terrain, came in pursuit only hours later. A few prisoners escaped from the camp at night and managed to tip off the Nabataean force on the whereabouts of the camp. They engaged the Greeks with javelins while they were asleep, and freed the families. Based on Hieronymus, Diodorus described how "all the 4000 foot-soldiers were slain, but of the 600 horsemen about fifty escaped, and of these the larger part were wounded".

The Nabataeans sent a letter of complaint in Aramaic, the lingua franca of the ancient Middle East, to Antigonus. The letter argued that the Nabataeans did not want war but were forced to attack the Greeks in self-defence. Antigonus replied that Athenaeus had acted on his own and that Nabataeans were indeed excused. This was a ruse however, which led to the second confrontation.

== Second confrontation ==
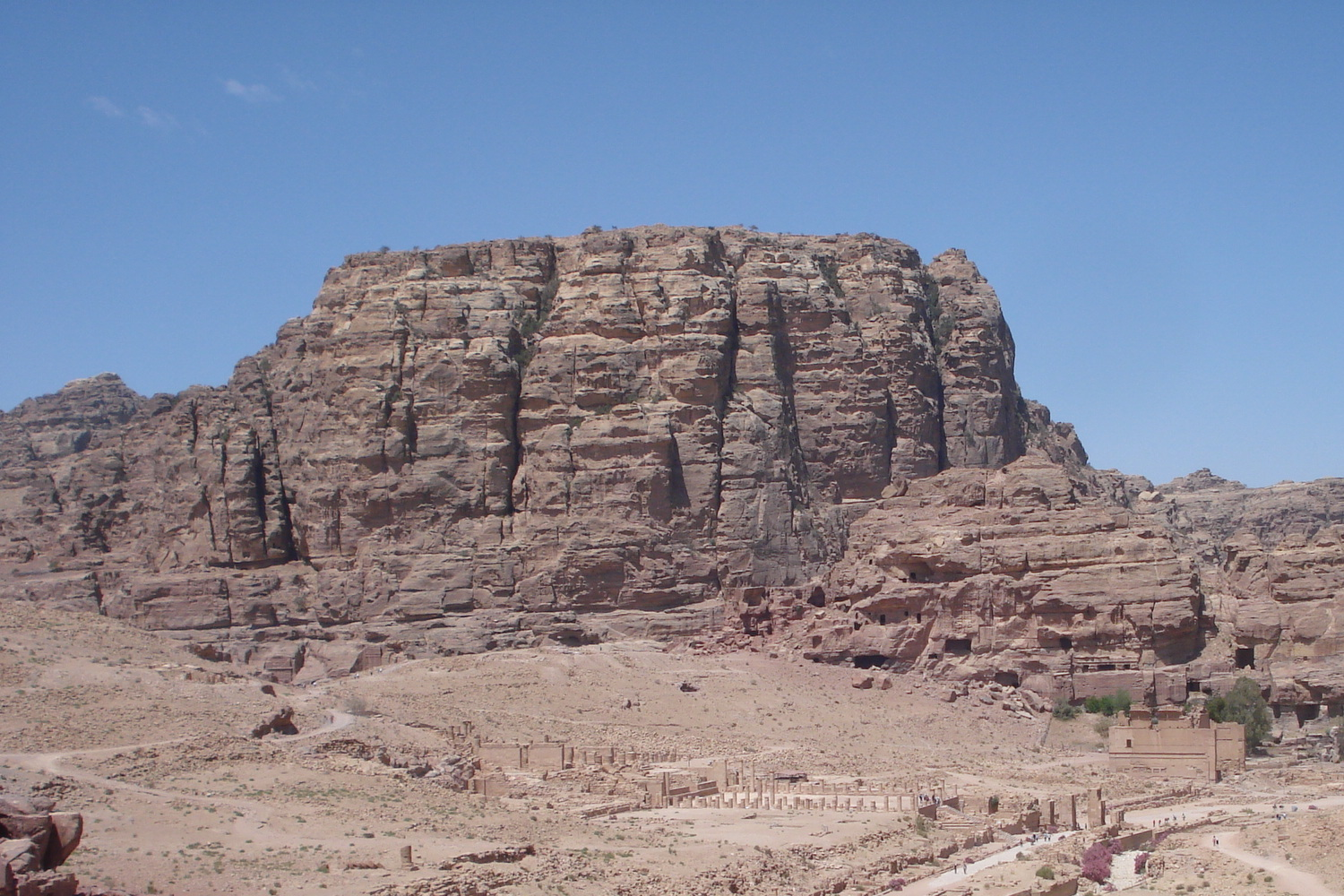
Umm Al-Biyara mountain in Petra, likely location of the second confrontation.

Despite what Antigonus had said to the Nabataeans, he then sent his son Demetrius with 4000 horsemen and 4000 infantry to march towards Nabataea. The force was lightly armed and was equipped with food provisions. However, the Nabataeans regarded Antigonus's previous letter with mistrust and had established outposts atop a mountain. After three days, the Greeks assembled for battle only to find the Arabs fully prepared. They had sent away their herds and massed what remained of their wealth atop a high mountain that was held by fighters who managed to repel a number of assaults.

By the next day, Demetrius, known to the Greek world as "the Besieger", demanded political prisoners and precious gifts to be provided as tribute. However, he did not receive the demanded tribute and withdrew. Plutarch, a Greek historian, later wrote that "by Demetrius's cool and resolute leadership he so overawed the barbarians that he captured from them 700 camels and great quantities of booty and returned in safety".

== Third confrontation ==
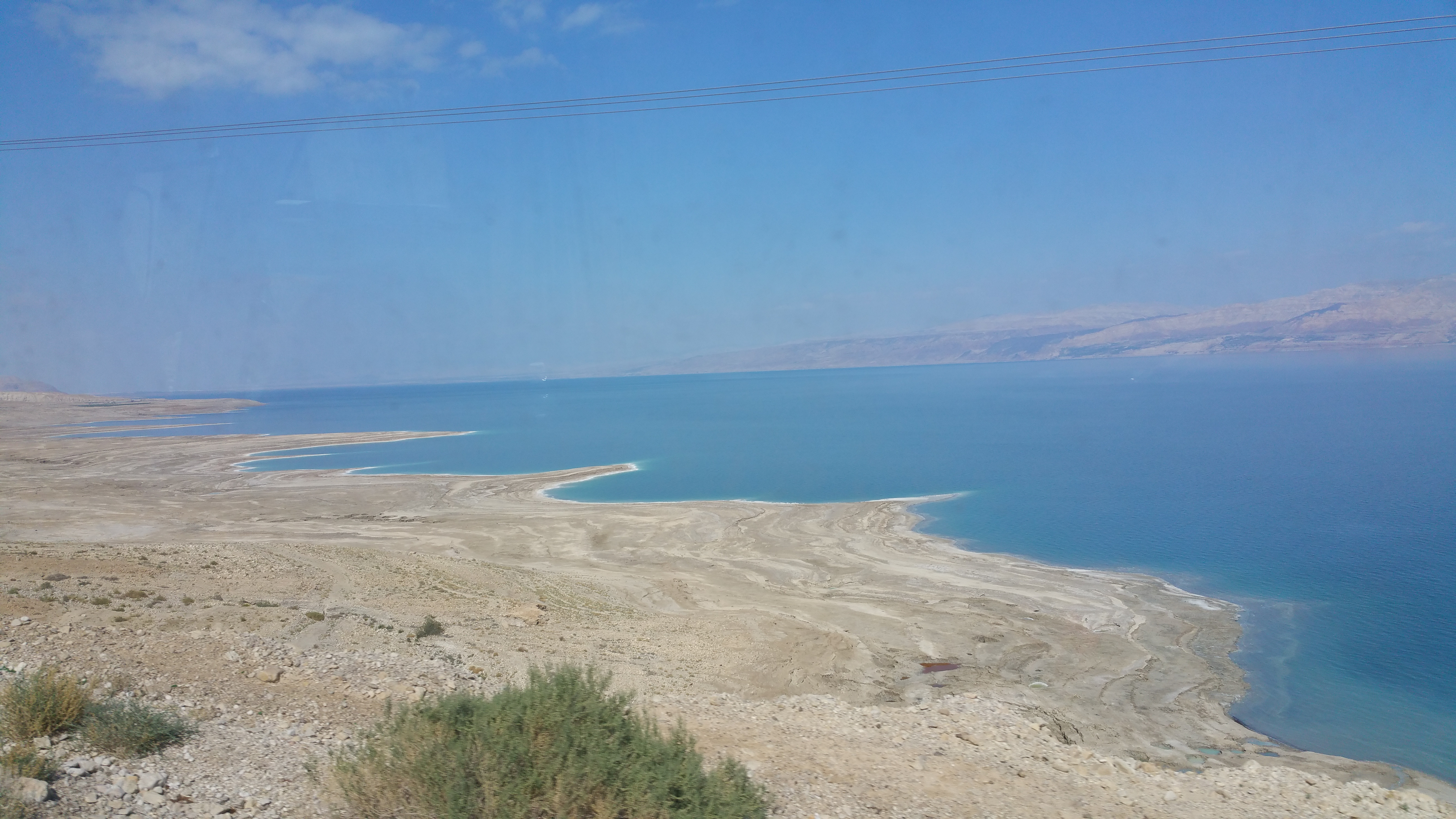
View of the Dead Sea

After Demetrius's unsuccessful engagement with the Nabataeans, he stayed by the Dead Sea to learn more about its bitumen industry. Residues of bitumen used to randomly float to the surface; inhabitants of the area, including the Nabataeans, would go out in boats to collect the samples, which were a highly priced commodity in the ancient world. Demetrius reported to his father on this profitable industry and how it could be harnessed to support his imperialist ambitions. Antigonus sent an expedition led by Hieronymus to the Dead Sea. The Nabataeans, furious at another Greek incursion, killed most of the expedition with arrow-fire. In light of this defeat, Antigonus abandoned his plans, as he was occupied with more important matters.

== Aftermath ==
During the Battle of Ipsus in 301 BC, the Antigonids lost to a Greek coalition that included the Seleucids. The series of wars between the Greek generals ended with the lands of modern-day Jordan being disputed between the Ptolemies based in Egypt and the Seleucids based in Syria. Much later, the Nabataeans again engaged with the Greeks, but with the terminally declining Seleucids this time. In the 84 BC Battle of Cana, the Nabataeans won a decisive victory over the Seleucids in which the Seleucid king Antiochus XII was slain.
