= Gaza massacre =

Gaza massacre may refer to:

- Gaza War (2008–2009)
- 2010 Gaza flotilla raid
- 2012 Gaza War
- 2014 Gaza War
- Gaza war (2023–)
  - Gaza genocide

== See also ==
- Category:Massacres of Palestinians
- Gaza (disambiguation)
- Gaza war (disambiguation)
- Rafah massacre (disambiguation)
- Flour Massacre (2024)
- Nuseirat rescue and massacre (2024)
