= Invasion of Gaza =

Invasion of Gaza could refer to events in the following conflicts:

- 2006 Gaza–Israel conflict, an Israeli military offensive into Gaza
- Gaza War (2008–2009) § Ground invasion, an Israeli offensive against Palestinian militant groups
- 2012 Gaza War, an Israeli operation in the Gaza Strip
- 2014 Gaza War, a conflict that included an Israeli ground invasion of Gaza

Or:

- Israeli invasion of the Gaza Strip

== See also ==
- Hasmonean conquest of Gaza
- Battle of Gaza
- Gaza war (disambiguation)
