= Aretas II =

Nabatean king from 103-96 BCE

Aretas II (/ˈærɪtəs/; Nabataean Aramaic: 𐢊𐢛𐢞𐢞, romanized: Ḥārītaṯ; Ancient Greek: Αρέτας, romanized: Arétās) was the ruler of the Nabataean Kingdom in the late 2nd century BCE. During his reign the Hasmonean Judea restricted the trade of the Nabataeans after conquering Gaza, which appealed to Aretas II for aid.

== Sources ==
The 1st century CE historian Josephus wrote about a king named Aretas/Erotimus in the context of Alexander Jannaeus' siege of Gaza.

== Reign ==
The dates for the reign for Aretas II and all other Nabataean kings is uncertain. Aretas II ruled some time in the 2nd century BCE. The historian Victor Langlois theorised in 1859 that Aretas II ruled from 66 to 62 BCE based on his study of Nabataean coins. Louis Félicien de Saulcy instead believed that Aretas II ruled around 97 BCE. In 1904, René Dussaud theorised that Aretas II ruled from 110 to 96 BCE. The Oxford Classical Dictionary places his reign as occurring from c. 120 to 96 BCE.

The first Nabataean dynastic coins might have been minted during the reign of Aretas. II. He is credited with starting Nabataean coinage minting.

Gaza was placed under siege by Jannaeus, the ruler of Hasmonean Judea, and appealed to Aretas II for aid. Aretas arrived too late and the city fell to Jannaeus in 99 BCE. The Hasmoneans blocked the major trade routes to the Nabataeans, who had to take an alterative route south of Petra and through Syria.

Obodas I was the son and successor of Aretas II. Obodas defeated the Hasmoneans and greatly expanded the power of the Nabataeans.

== See also ==
- List of rulers of Nabatea

== Works cited ==
=== Books ===
- Grig, Lucy (2015). "Aretas". Oxford Classical Dictionary. Oxford University Press. ISBN 9780197851371.
- Sullivan, Richard (1990). Near Eastern Royalty and Rome, 100-30 Bc. University of Toronto Press. ISBN 0802026826.
- Teixidor, Javier (1977). The Pagan God: Popular Religion in the Greco-Roman Near East. Princeton University Press.

=== Journals ===
- Barkay, Rachel (2019). "Coinage of the Nabataeans". Qedem. 58. Hebrew University of Jerusalem: III–XVI, 1–150. doi:10.2307/26910342. JSTOR 26910342.
- Barkay, Rachel (2006). "Seven New Silver Coins of Malichus I and Obodas III". Numismatic Chronicle. 166. Royal Numismatic Society: 99–103. doi:10.2307/42666403. JSTOR 42666403.
- Barkay, Rachel (2011). "The Earliest Nabataean Coinage". Numismatic Chronicle. 171. Royal Numismatic Society: 67–73. doi:10.2307/42667225. JSTOR 42667225.
- Meshorer, Ya'akov (1975). "Nabataean Coins". Qedem. 3. Hebrew University of Jerusalem: 1–112. doi:10.2307/43587087. JSTOR 43587087.

=== Web ===
- "Aretas II of Nabataea (king of the Nabatens, 103-96 BC)". Royal Library of Belgium. Archived from the original on 8 November 2026.

== Bibliography ==
- Shatzman, Israel (1991), The Armies of the Hasmonaeans and Herod: From Hellenistic to Roman Frameworks, Mohr Siebeck, ISBN 3-16-145617-3
- Taylor, Jane (2001), Petra and the Lost Kingdom of the Nabataeans: And the Lost Kingdom of the Nabataeans, I.B.Tauris, ISBN 1-86064-508-9
