= Gaza ceasefire =

Gaza ceasefire may refer to:

- 2008 Israel–Hamas ceasefire
- 2023 Gaza war ceasefire
- January 2025 Gaza war ceasefire
- Gaza peace plan (began October 2025)
- Calls for a ceasefire during the Gaza war

== See also ==
- Gaza–Israel clashes
