= Siege of Gaza =

Siege of Gaza may refer to:

- Siege of Gaza (332 BC), as part of the Wars of Alexander the Great
- Blockade of the Gaza Strip, by Egypt and Israel since 2005
  - Israeli blockade of the Gaza Strip (2023–present), as part of the Gaza war
- Siege of Gaza City (2023–2025), as part of the Gaza war

== See also ==
- Blockade of Gaza (disambiguation)
- Gaza War (disambiguation)
