= Israel–Syria incident =

Israel–Syria incident may refer to:

- March 2017 Israel–Syria incident
- February 2018 Israel–Syria incident
