= Antiochus XII Dionysus =

King of Syria from 87 to 82 BC

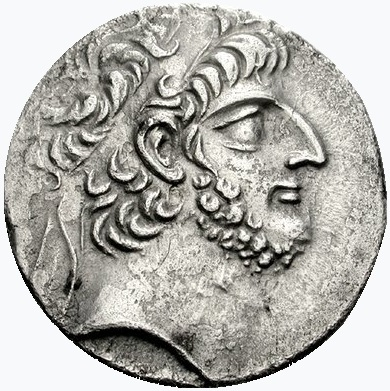
- Antiochus XII's portrait on the obverse of a tetradrachm, wearing the royal diadem

King of Syria
- Reign: 87 – 82 BC
- Predecessors: Demetrius III, Philip I
- Successors: Philip I, Antiochus XIII, Cleopatra Selene
- Contender: Philip I
- Born: between 124 and 109 BC
- Died: 82 BC; Cana
- Issue: Cleopatra, Antiochis
- Dynasty: Seleucid
- Father: Antiochus VIII
- Mother: Tryphaena

Antiochus XII Dionysus Epiphanes Philopator Callinicus (Ancient Greek: Ἀντίοχος Διόνυσος Ἐπιφανής Φιλοπάτωρ Καλλίνικος; between 124 and 109 BC – 82 BC) was a Hellenistic Seleucid monarch who reigned as King of Syria between 87 and 82 BC. The youngest son of King Antiochus VIII, he took the throne and captured Damascus after his brother Philip I defeated another brother, Demetrius III, who went into exile in Parthia. Philip I remained in the Syrian capital Antioch. Antiochus XII consolidated his territory within inner Syria and did not seek to expand into his brother's territories. Philip I attempted to annex Damascus but was repulsed. Antiochus XII focused his attention on Syria's southern reaches into which the Judaeans and Nabataeans sought to expand.

Antiochus XII reinforced his southern frontier and warred with his neighbors, conducting two campaigns against Nabataea that included engagements with Judea. After several victories in his first campaign, he was killed towards the end of his second campaign against the Nabateans at the Battle of Cana in 82 BC. The Syrian throne was claimed by the queen dowager Cleopatra Selene and her son Antiochus XIII, while Damascus was captured by the forces of the Nabatean king Aretas III.

== Name and background ==
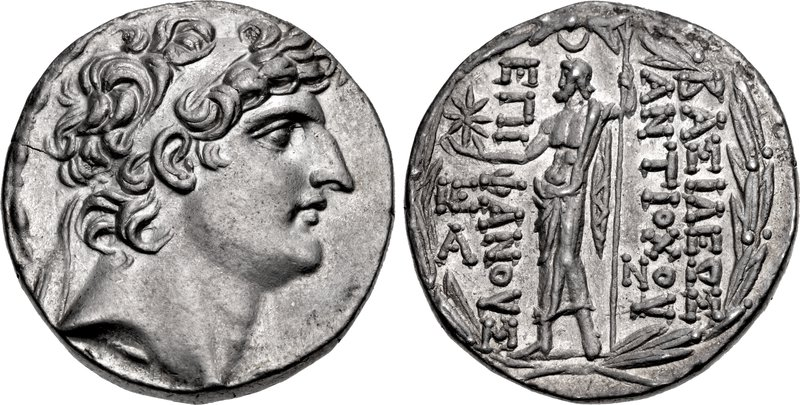
Coin of Antiochus VIII, father of Antiochus XII

Antiochus, Greek for "resolute in contention", was a dynastic name borne by many Seleucid monarchs. The Seleucid dynasty's founder Seleucus I named the capital of Syria, Antioch, in honor of his father Antiochus. Antiochus XII was the fifth and youngest son of Antiochus VIII and his Ptolemaic Egyptian wife Tryphaena, (Note: Ancient sources do not mention the name of Antiochus XII's mother but it is generally assumed by modern scholars that she was Tryphaena, who was mentioned explicitly by Porphyry as the mother of Antiochus XII's older twin brothers, Antiochus XI and Philip I.) who married in 124 BC. In 109 BC, Tryphaena was killed by Antiochus VIII's half-brother Antiochus IX, who fought with Antiochus VIII from 113 BC for the throne of Syria. Antiochus XII's brothers were Seleucus VI, Antiochus XI, Philip I and Demetrius III.

Following Antiochus VIII's assassination in 96 BC, his second wife, Tryphaena's sister Cleopatra Selene, married Antiochus IX and then his son Antiochus X, who fought with Antiochus XII's four brothers for the throne. By 88 BC, only Demetrius III and Philip I remained; Demetrius III was originally based in Damascus before extending his authority to most of Syria. He was defeated by Philip I and his Parthian allies in 87 BC and exiled to Parthia, where he died of an unknown illness. Philip I took control of the capital, while Cleopatra Selene, now a widow, took shelter in Ptolemais with her sons by Antiochus X.

== Reign ==
The departure of Demetrius III left a power vacuum in Damascus that was filled by Antiochus XII. Coins minted during the reign of Demetrius III are dated to the Seleucid year (SE) 225 (88/87 BC), (Note: Some dates in the article are given according to the Seleucid era. Each Seleucid year started in the late autumn of a Gregorian year; thus, a Seleucid year overlaps two Gregorian ones.) while the earliest coins minted during the reign of Antiochus XII have the date 226 SE (87/86 BC), suggesting there was a rapid assumption of power by Antiochus XII. Monarchs of the Hellenistic period did not use regnal numbers, which is a more modern practice, but instead used epithets to distinguish themselves from similarly named monarchs. Three of Antiochus XII's four epithets, Epiphanes (illustrious)–previously used by his father, Philopator (father-loving) and Callinicus (nobly victorious), served to emphasize the ancestry of his grandfather Demetrius II in contrast to the line of the latter's brother Antiochus VII, which was represented by Antiochus IX and his descendants; Callinicus may have been an echo of Demetrius II's epithet Nikator (victorious). (Note: It could also mean he was portraying himself as an able warrior capable of defending his people against his enemies, the Nabataeans.) He likely used his other epithet Dionysus to associate himself with the Greek god of wine in his role as conqueror of the East. (Note: Dionysus had many functions, including his role as a god of vegetation, which is probably not the reason why Antiochus XII invoked him in his epithet; several arguments were presented by modern scholars to explain the appearance of the epithet: Since both his mother and grandmother were Ptolemaic, it is also possible that he meant to emphasize his Ptolemaic descent since the epithet was used by Ptolemaic kings.; The Syro-Phoenician religious complex was based on triads that include a supreme god, a supreme goddess, and their son; the deities taking those roles were diverse. It is possible that by 145 BC, Dionysus took the role of the son, a view rejected by the historian Jane L. Lightfoot. The numismatist Nicholas L. Wright presented the hypothesis that a Seleucid king appearing on his coins wearing a radiate crown indicated a ritual marriage between the king and Atargatis, Syria's supreme goddess. Hence, the king is considering himself the manifestation of Syria's supreme god. Antiochus VIII appeared with the radiate crown, and it is probable, in the view of Wright, that by assuming the epithet Dionysus, Antiochus XII was proclaiming that he was not just Antiochus VIII's political successor, but also his spiritual heir, being the son of the supreme god.) Antiochus XII was depicted on coinage with an exaggerated hawked nose in the likeness of his father, as a means of strengthening the legitimacy of his succession.

=== Policies and territory ===
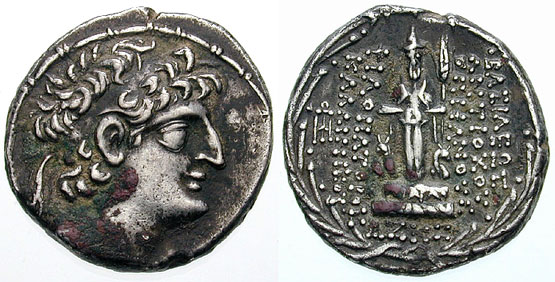
Tetradrachm of Antiochus XII depicting the Semitic deity Hadad on the reverse

According to historian Alfred Bellinger, Antiochus XII may have received assistance from Ptolemaic Egypt to gain his throne. This view is reflected in Antiochus XII's policies, which were targeted at the south in Nabataea and Judaea, but not towards expansion within the kingdom of Syria. His dominion was limited to inner Syria, centered on Damascus, which served as his capital and primary mint. (Note: Ernest Babelon attributed some of the King's coins to the mint of Ptolemais, based on the existence of the monogram, but this attribution was rejected by Edward Theodore Newell, which is the academic consensus. The monogram appeared on a minority of the coins issued in Ptolemais and it also appeared on coins issued in other cities, making the use of it to determine a certain mint futile.) Antiochus XII also ruled over the town of Gadara, governed by an official named Philotas. In 100 BC, Gadara had been conquered by the Hasmonean king of Judea Alexander Jannaeus, who partially destroyed its walls, but it was recaptured by the Seleucids in 93 BC. (Note: The Nabataean king Obodas I defeated the Judaeans at some point before 93 BC; this is deduced from the account of Josephus, who stated that following the defeat Alexander Jannaeus was caught in a civil war that lasted six years. Since this war ended only with the intervention of Demetrius III who lost his throne in 87 BC, then the year 93 BC is the terminus post quem for the defeat. Philotas commissioned an inscription, dated to 228 SE (85/84 BC), celebrating the reconstruction of Gadara's defensive walls. It seems that Gadara freed itself from Judea following the latter's defeat at the hands of the Nabataeans.) Gadara held great strategic importance for Syria as it served as a major military hub for operations in the south. Controlling it was vital to the war effort against the Judaeans, which led Antiochus to rebuild the city's defenses in 228 SE (85/84 BC). Historian Aryeh Kasher suggested that Antiochus XII dug what the first-century historian Josephus called the "trench of Antiochus" (or valley of Antiochus) to protect Damascus from the Nabataeans; the trench was probably located in the Hula Valley.

Seleucid coins often had depictions of their Greek deities, but the silver coinage of Antiochus XII depicted the supreme Semitic god Hadad on the reverse, possibly in recognition of the shrinking borders of the kingdom, which convinced the monarch of the importance of the local cults. By promoting indigenous deities, Seleucid kings hoped to gain the support of their non-Greek subjects. According to Bellinger, the use of Hadad indicated that Antiochus XII placed focus on his "intention of being first and foremost king of Damascus". During his reign, Demetrius III had also depicted a Semitic deity, Atargatis, on his currency. In the view of historian Kay Ehling, the change of coin imagery from Atargatis to Hadad probably served two goals: to imply that Antiochus XII had a different policy focus than his predecessor, and to demonstrate his intention of maintaining a good relationship with the Semitic population of Damascus, who comprised the majority of the inhabitants, to avoid tension with Greek settlers. Seleucid kings presented themselves as protectors of Hellenism and patronized intellectuals and philosophers, but Antiochus XII may have adopted a different attitude; he ordered the expulsion of such scholars. (Note: A letter from a king named Antiochus, regarding the expulsion of all philosophers from the kingdom, is contained in the Deipnosophistae written by the second-century rhetorician Athenaeus. The king wanted the philosophers exiled for corrupting young men; the latter were to be hanged and their fathers investigated. There are indications in the document that this Antiochus ruled during the late Seleucid period; historian Edwyn Bevan, considering the general Seleucid patronage of philosophers, noted that those instructions are "incredible". According to Bevan, this attitude can be explained by the deteriorating fortunes of the kingdom during the late Seleucid period; cities in Syria and Cilicia were asserting their independence, and it would be logical for the king to move against philosophers if they showed signs of "republicanism". Another clue is that the king sent his letter to an official named "Phanias", who seems to have been the highest official in the realm, ordering him to expel the philosophers from the polis and chora (city and its territory). Bevan did not believe that Antiochus wanted the philosophers expelled from the kingdom, but maybe from one city, perhaps Antioch. But, in the view of historian Jörg-Dieter Gauger, the polis and chora designate the whole kingdom since it would have made little sense if they designated one city and its region; the philosophers could have continued their "evil" business in other cities. If one official, Phanias, whom the letter's language indicates that only he had a higher command and was not a mere city commander, can execute the king's instructions in the whole county, then the kingdom's area is not substantial, indicating a period when the Seleucids ruled a contracted Syria. Bevan suggested Antiochus XIII (r. 82–64 BC), while Gauger suggested either Antiochus XII or Antiochus XIII as the king who ordered the philosophers banished. Franz Altheim considered king Antiochus IV (r. 175–164 BC) to be the king who sent the letter. The document's authenticity is questioned: Ludwig Radermacher considered the letter a Jewish forgery to discredit their enemy Antiochus IV, while Michel Austin, ancient history senior lecturer at the University of St Andrews, did not comment on the historical setting of the letter but doubted its authenticity.)

=== Military campaigns ===
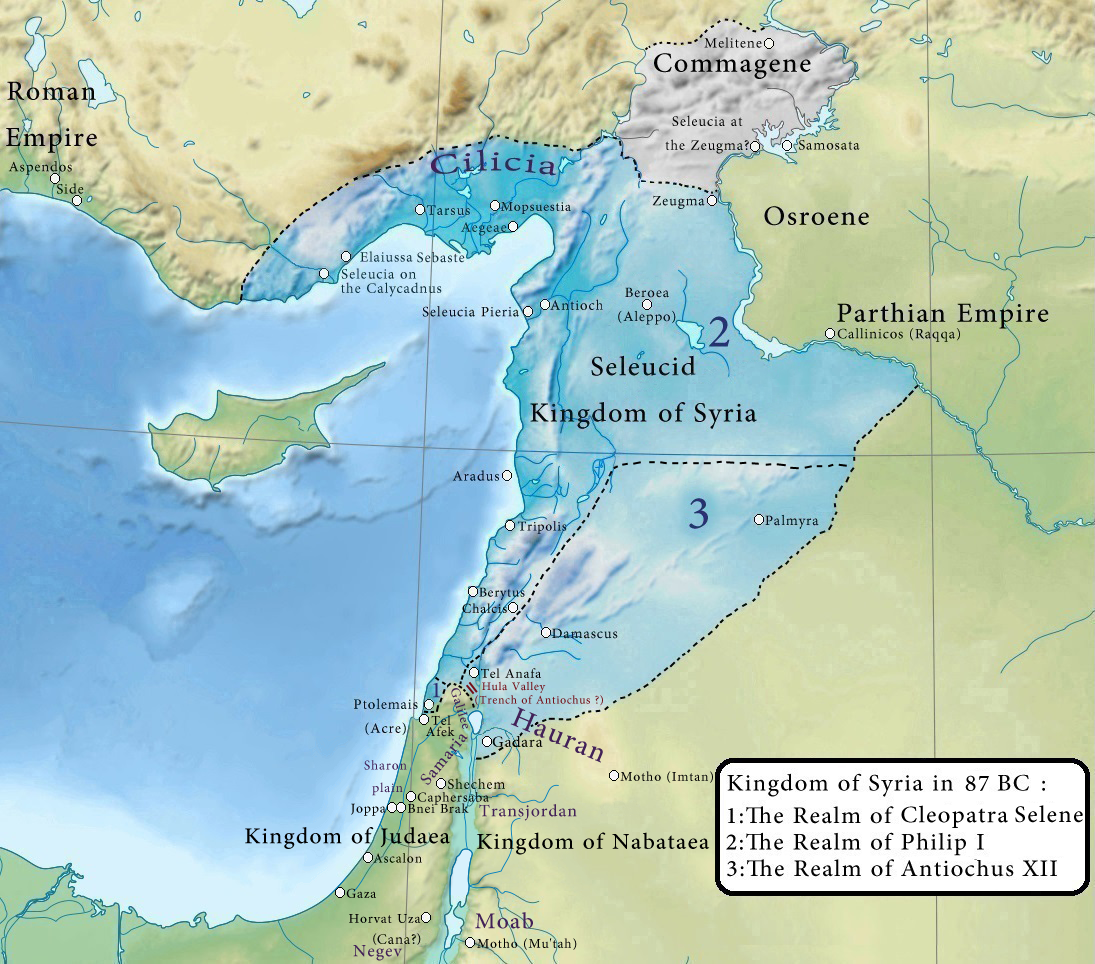
Syria in 87 BC

Early in his reign, Antiochus XII attacked the Nabataeans and the Judaeans, whose territories both lay south of his own. This conflict was recorded by Josephus, although he made no mention of the name of the Nabataean king. Josephus mentioned two campaigns against the Nabataeans, but did not explain the motives leading the Syrian King to attack them. Modern scholars presented several theories. In the view of Israel Shatzman, Antiochus XII may have feared the growing power of the Nabataeans, who were expanding into southern Syria. Zayn Bilkadi suggested that Antiochus XII wanted to take control over the Nabataeans' crude oil industry, while Alexander Fantalkin and Oren Tal suggested that the Nabataeans actively supported Philip I in his attempts to take control over Antiochus XII's realm.

==== First Nabataean campaign and the incursions of Philip I ====
Antiochus XII's first Nabataean campaign was launched in 87 BC, and might have included a battle near Motho, modern Imtan in the region of Hauran, as proposed by the historian Hans Peter Roschinski, who drew on the writings of Stephanus of Byzantium. The Byzantine historian preserved in his book, Ethica, fragments from a lost work by the historian Uranius of Apamea, who wrote a book titled Arabica, which has been dated to 300 AD. In the account of Uranius, King Antigonus I (r. 306–301 BC) is killed at Motho by a king of the Arabs named Rabbel. The name Motho could refer to a northern city in Hauran or a southern city in Moab. (Note: In the Notitia Dignitatum, Motho is where the Roman Cohors I Augusta Thracum Equitata was stationed. The city of Mu'tah in Moab, where the Equites Scutarii Illyriciani was stationed, is named Motha in the Notitia Dignitatum.) The name of Antigonus was regularly "corrected" to Antiochus by different scholars who believed that Uranius was referring to Antiochus XII. (Note: The historian Józef Milik rejected the practice of correcting Uranius's work. Milik believed that instead of Antigonus I or Antiochus XII, the passage refers to Athenaeus, an official of Antigonus who fought the Nabataeans.) Roschinski considered it conceivable that Stephanus was conflating two events taking place during the reign of the Nabataean King Rabbel I: a battle of Antiochus XII's first Nabataean campaign at Motho in the north, and the battle from the second Nabataean campaign in which Antiochus XII was killed. Shatzman, on the other hand, noted that nowhere in his work did Stephanus indicate that the battle of Motho took place in the north.

Taking advantage of his brother's absence, Philip I seized Damascus, aided by the governor of the city's citadel, Milesius, who opened the gates to him. According to Josephus, Milesius received no reward from Philip I, who attributed the betrayal to the general's fear, leading Milesius to betray Philip I, who had left the city to attend an event in the nearby hippodrome. The general closed the gates, locking Philip I out, and awaited the return of Antiochus XII, who had hastily ended his campaign when he heard of his brother's occupation of the city. (Note: The citadel is called "akra" by Josephus; a word that indicates a garrisoned fortified camp located in the outskirts of a city. Josephus also implied that the citadel was close to the hippodrome of Damascus, whose remains are located under the Dahdah cemetery just outside the ancient city.) Modern scholars noted that Seleucid currency, struck during campaigns against a rival (or usurper), portrayed the King sporting a beard. During his first two years, Antiochus XII's visage appeared beardless, but this changed in 228 SE (85/84 BC). This is possibly related to Philip I's attack on Damascus, but this supposition has little support, as Antiochus XII failed to take any action against his brother. No coins were minted during the period that Philip I held Damascus, indicating only a brief occupation of the city.

==== Second Nabataean campaign, war in Judea and death ====
Although his territory directly abutted Nabataean territory, for his second Nabataean campaign Antiochus XII instead chose to march his forces through Judaea along the coast, probably to attack the Nabataean-dominated Negev, which would have cut off the port city of Gaza, threatened Nabataean Mediterranean trade, and curbed Nabataean ambitions in the Transjordan. This route would have allowed Antiochus XII to keep Alexander Jannaeus at bay. According to Josephus, the Judaean King feared Antiochus XII's intentions and ordered the "Yannai Line" to be built, which consisted of a trench that fronted a defensive wall dotted with wooden towers. The trench stretched 28 kilometers (17 mi) from Caphersaba to the sea near Joppa. Antiochus XII leveled the trench, burned the fortifications, and continued his march into Nabataean territory.

The account of the campaign, written by Josephus, is subject to some debate; the historian wrote that Antiochus XII's forces defeated those of Alexander Jannaeus, but the eighth-century historian George Syncellus mentioned a defeat suffered by Antiochus XII at the hands of the Judaean king. (Note: It seems that Syncellus did not rely only on Josephus and had access to other sources; Heinrich Gelzer suggested that Syncellus used the account of Justus of Tiberias. It is possible that Josephus deliberately ignored the victories of Alexander Jannaeus; this can be explained by Josephus's reliance on the first century BC historian Nicolaus of Damascus, whose treatment of the Hasmonean dynasty is hostile due to the latter's role in destroying many Hellenistic centers.) The existence of the Yannai Line has been questioned by several historians, (Note: The trench of Alexander Jannaeus was named the "Yannai Line" by Jacob Kaplan in the 1950s. Kaplan interpreted archeological remains from Bnei Brak and Tel Aviv as parts of that line and his conclusions were generally accepted by the majority of scholars. Bezalel Bar-Kochva raised questions regarding the line, noting that it would have taken Antiochus XII ten to fifteen days to march from Damascus to the Sharon plain where the line purportedly stood, which would not be sufficient time for such a project to be constructed. Kenneth Atkinson suggested that Alexander Jannaeus constructed the Yannai Line after defeating Antiochus XII, in anticipation of Antiochus XII's return. Bar-Kochva suggested that the line was erected earlier than Antiochus XII's invasion, perhaps to fend off a different enemy. He suggested that the plain stretching 4 kilometers (2.5 mi) between western Samaria and Tel Afek east of the Yarkon River's source was the location of the line. The archeological remains interpreted by Kaplan as evidence for the line do not fit the time frame of Antiochus XII's invasion and may belong to non-military civilian establishments.) and Josephus's explanation of Alexander Jannaeus's attempt to stop the march of Antiochus XII, because of his fears of the latter's intentions, is unsatisfactory. Both the Nabataeans and Syrians were enemies of Judea and it would have been to Alexander Jannaeus's benefit if those two powers were in conflict. Syncellus may have been referring to an earlier confrontation between the Syrian king and Alexander Jannaeus. Thus the statement of Syncellus supports the notion that Antiochus XII's second Nabataean campaign was also aimed at Judea; perhaps Antiochus XII sought to annex the coastal cities of Alexander Jannaeus as retribution for the defeat mentioned by Syncellus. Another objective would be subduing the Judaeans to keep them from attacking Syria while Antiochus XII was busy in Nabataea.

The final engagement between the forces of Antiochus XII and the Nabataeans occurred near the village of Cana, (Note: If the account of Uranius is accepted, and if he meant Antiochus XII instead of Antigonus I, then the last battle took place near Motho in Moab.) the location of which is unknown, but is generally assumed by modern scholars to be southwest of the Dead Sea. Historian Siegfried Mittmann considered it to be synonymous with Qina, modern-day Horvat Uza, as mentioned by Josephus in Book 15 of his Antiquities. Details of the battle, as written by Josephus, spoke of the Nabataeans employing a feigned retreat, then counterattacking the Syrian forces before their ranks could be ordered. Antiochus XII managed to rally his troops and weathered the attack, but he fought in the front lines, jeopardizing his life, and he eventually fell. The year of Antiochus XII's death is debated, but his last coins struck in Damascus are dated to 230 SE (83/82 BC).

== Aftermath and legacy ==
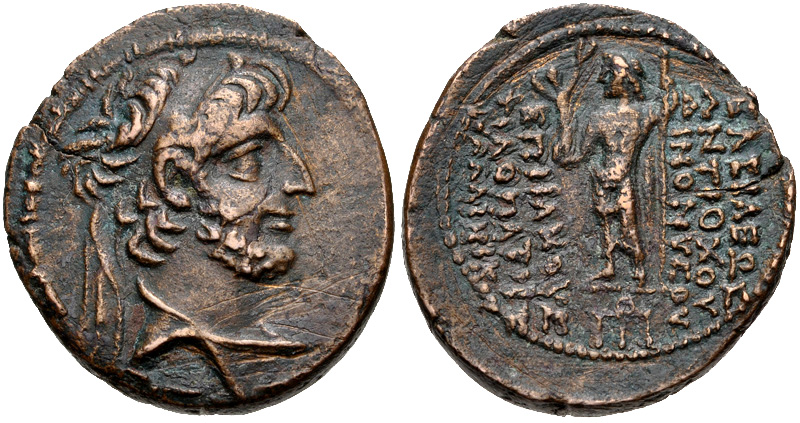
A coin of Antiochus XII with Zeus depicted on the reverse

According to Josephus, the death of the King resulted in a rout of the Syrian forces, with many being killed in the field or during the retreat. Survivors of the rout sheltered in Cana, where most died of starvation. Antiochus XII was the last energetic Seleucid king. Little is recorded of Philip I after his attempt at annexing Damascus, which was left without a protector after the death of Antiochus XII. Fearing the Ituraean ruler Ptolemy, the people of Damascus invited Aretas III of Nabataea to take the city. (Note: It is not known if it was Aretas III who defeated Antiochus XII. The identity of the Syrian king's Nabataean enemy is much debated. Albert Kammerer and Philip C. Hammond used the account of Uranius and asserted that it was Rabbel I. Jean Starcky argued that the Nabataean monarch was Obodas I, whom Maurice Sartre preferred and concluded that he probably did not survive long after his battle with Antiochus XII.) The numismatist Oliver D. Hoover suggested that Aretas III did not hold Damascus for long before the city returned to Seleucid possession.

The identity of Antiochus XII's wife remains unknown, but according to the sixth-century historian John Malalas, whose work is considered generally unreliable by scholars, the King had two daughters, Cleopatra and Antiochis. Queen Cleopatra Selene, who went into hiding after the death of Antiochus X in 224 SE (89/88 BC), took advantage of Antiochus XII's death and declared her son Antiochus XIII king with herself as queen regent and regnant. Coins struck during her regency show the marks of the Damascus mint. Archeologist Nicholas L. Wright suggested that Cleopatra Selene's takeover of Damascus took place after 80 BC. Josephus called Antiochus XII the last Seleucid king, and Malalas, according to the translation of the historian Glanville Downey, followed suit; the last Seleucid king was in fact Antiochus XIII, who was dethroned in 64 BC after Antioch was annexed by the Romans. (Note: The most complete surviving copy of Malalas's work, who wrote in the sixth century, is the Baroccianus Graecus manuscript from the eleventh century, which includes many abbreviations and missing words. Malalas himself used vernacular Greek, making his language sometimes difficult to understand. Different scholars presented their reading of Malalas's chronicles: The reading of Glanville Downey have "Antiochus Dionysus the Leper, father of Cleopatra and Antiochis". Downey noted that Malalas conflated Antiochus XII with his successor Antiochus XIII, who surrendered to the Romans in 64 BC; the Byzantine historian attributed the act of surrender to Antiochus XII. The Greek version of Malalas's work has the name "Antiochus Dionikous" while the older Church Slavonic version has "Antiochus Dionysos". The German translation by Johannes Thurn and Mischa Meier matched Downey's English reading.; In the translation of Elizabeth Jeffreys (et al.), the passage reads: "Antiochus, the son of Dionikes the leper, father of Cleopatra and Antiochis."; Tigranes II of Armenia conquered Syria c. 74 BC; according to Malalas, Antiochus Dionysos asked Pompey to be reinstated on the throne following the ejection of Tigranes II by the Romans. The Syrian king was granted his wish and in his will, he bequeathed Syria to the Romans, thus ending the Seleucid dynasty. Bellinger noted the contradictions in Malalas's statements, as the Byzantine historian mentioned earlier in his account that Pompey annexed Antioch. In the view of Bellinger, Malalas's account is nonsense. Downey also questioned the account but considered it possible that Malalas used local Antiochene sources that attempted to scale down the humiliation of annexation inventing the story of an abdication, which in itself is not out of question, and the bequeathing had a precedent in Roman history; Attalus II of Pergamon bequeathed his kingdom to Rome in 138 BC.)

== Family tree ==
Family tree of Antiochus XII

Seleucus IV (Note: Hoover 2000, p. 107)	Laodice IV (Note: Hoover 2000, p. 108)	Ptolemy V	Cleopatra I
Demetrius I	Laodice V	Ptolemy VI	Cleopatra II
Demetrius II (Note: Wright 2012, p. iii)	Cleopatra Thea (Note: Ogden 1999, p. 149)	Cleopatra III	Ptolemy VIII
Antiochus VIII	Tryphaena
Antiochus XII

Citations:

== See also ==
- List of Syrian monarchs
- Timeline of Syrian history

== Notes ==
Antiochus XII Dionysus Seleucid dynasty Born: Unknown Died: 82 BC
Regnal titles
Preceded by Demetrius III; Philip I	King of Syria; 87–82 BC with Philip I (87–82 BC)	Succeeded by Philip I Antiochus XIII; Cleopatra Selene
