= Gaza–Israel clashes =

Gaza–Israel clashes may refer to the Gaza–Israel conflict in general, or more specifically:

- March 2010 Gaza–Israel clashes
- March 2012 Gaza–Israel clashes
- November 2018 Gaza–Israel clashes
- May 2019 Gaza–Israel clashes
- November 2019 Gaza–Israel clashes
- 2022 Gaza–Israel clashes
- May 2023 Gaza–Israel clashes

== See also ==
- Gaza war (disambiguation)
- Battle of Gaza
- Gaza crisis
- Gaza war ceasefire
