= Gaza war (disambiguation) =

Gaza war most commonly refers to the Gaza war that has taken place since 7 October 2023, but may also refer to other wars and events of the Gaza–Israel conflict:

- 2006 Gaza–Israel conflict, also known as Operation Summer Rains
- Gaza War (2008–2009), also known as the First Gaza War, Operation Cast Lead, the Gaza Massace, or Battle of al-Furqan
- 2012 Gaza War, also known as Operation Pillar of Defense or Operation Stones of Baked Clay
- 2014 Gaza War, also known as Operation Protective Edge or Battle of the Withered Grain
- 2021 Israel–Palestine crisis, sometimes referred to as the Unity Intifada
- 2022 Gaza–Israel clashes, or Operation Breaking Dawn

== See also ==
- Battle of Gaza
- Gaza–Israel clashes
- Invasion of Gaza
- Gaza
- Gaza crisis
- Gaza massacre
- Siege of Gaza
- Lebanon war
- List of wars involving Palestine
- List of wars involving Israel
