= Obodas I =

Nabataean king and deity

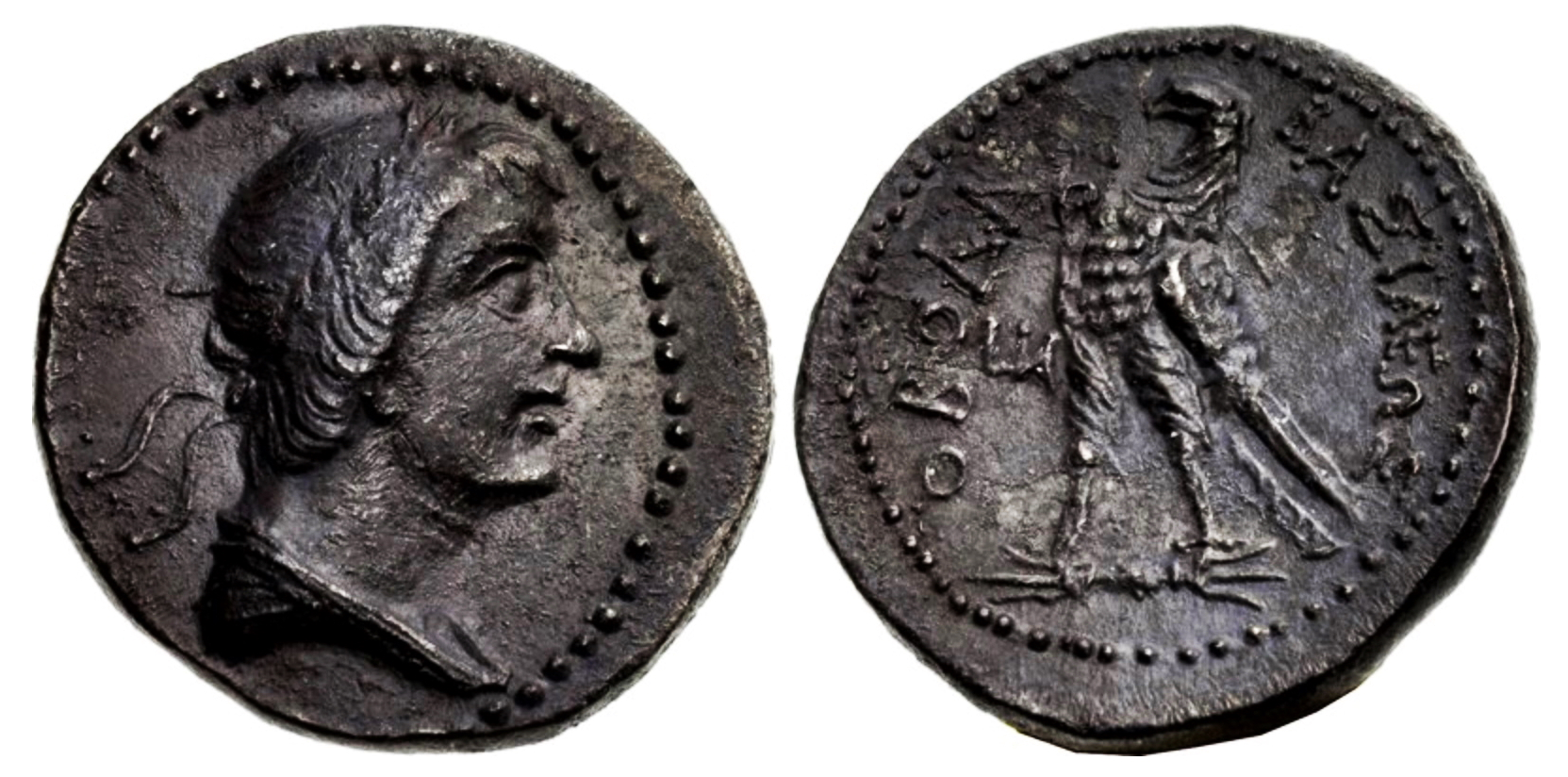
Silver drachm of Obodas I (86 BC)

Obodas I (Nabataean Aramaic: 𐢗𐢃𐢅𐢞, romanized: ʿŌbōdaṯ; Ancient Greek: Ὀβόδας) was a Nabataean king who ruled over the kingdom from 96 to 85 BCE. Celebrated by his people for having defeated both Hasmonean and Seleucid forces who invaded Nabataea, he was worshipped and possibly deified after death - though this may be based on a faulty understanding of Nabataean religious practices which remain largely obscure to modern scholarship. A Nabataean inscription honouring him in Ein Avdat is considered to be one of the oldest examples of poetic verse in the Arabic language, transcribed in Nabataean script. The town of Avdat (originally Abda(t) in Arabic) was named for him.

== Name ==
His name transcribed in Nabataean Aramaic was found in an inscription carved into a rock overlooking the Ein Avdat gorge, just over 4 kilometres (2.5 mi) from the site of the ruins of one of the Nabataean cities he ruled over in Palestine's Negev. It is composed of four letters 'a-b-d-t (Square Aramaic script:אבדת or Arabic script:عبدة), and is transliterated as 'Abda(t) or Abdeh, the original Arabic name for the town of Avdat. Al-Mallah transcribes his name in Arabic as عُبادة, ʿubādah, which means "submission, obedience or worship (of god)".

== Life ==
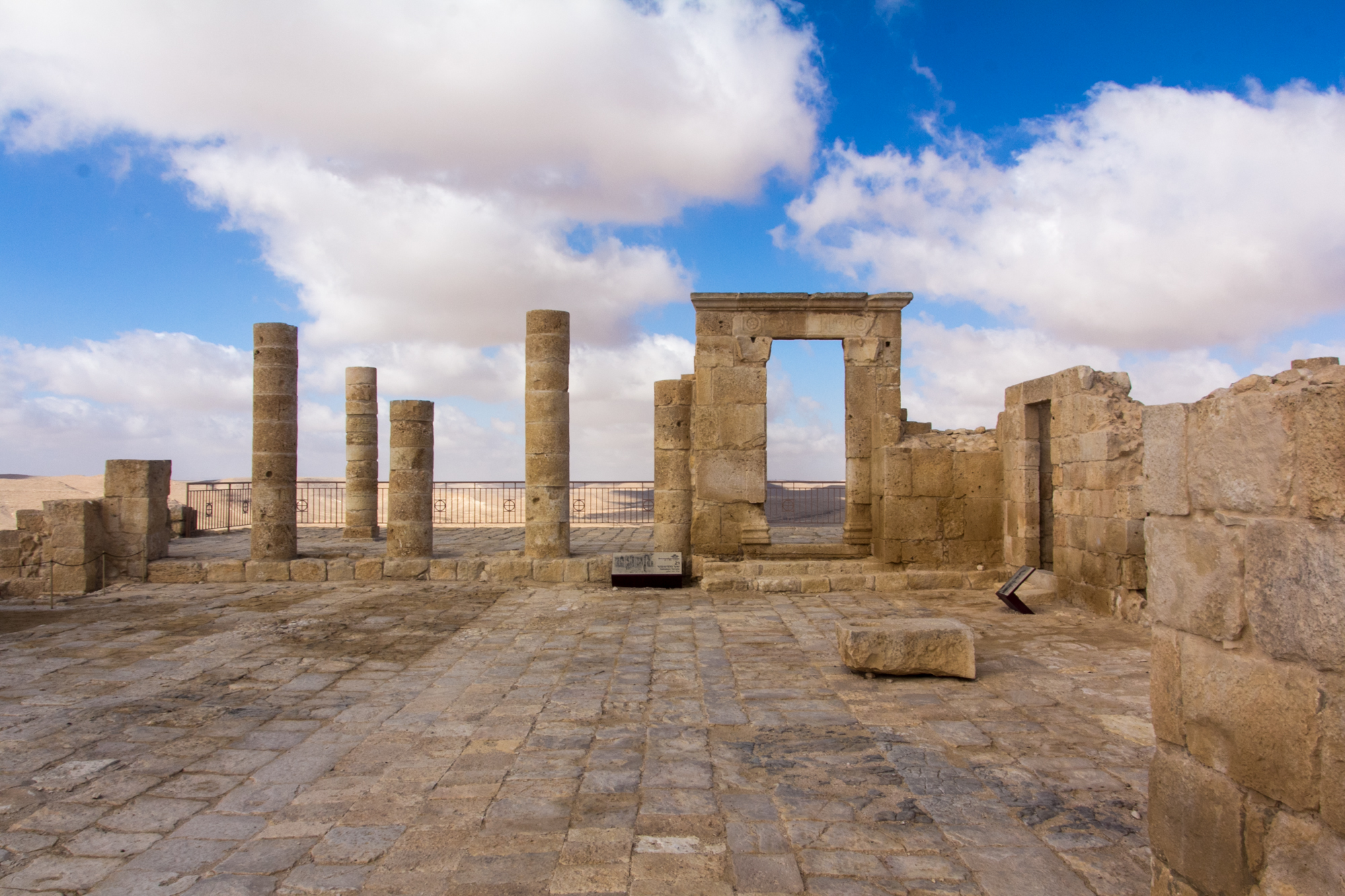
Remains of Byzantine church at Avdat in the Negev, which reused elements of a temple built by the Nabataeans to commemorate king Obodas I and his victories against the Hasmoneans and the Seleucids

Obodas I was the successor of Aretas II, and one of his sons, from whom he inherited the war with the Hasmonean kingdom.

Around 93 BCE, Obodas engaged the forces of Alexander Jannaeus in Nabataean territory near Gadara (Umm Qais), just east of the Sea of Galilee, near the Golan Heights. Using camel cavalry, he forced Jannaeus into a valley where he completed the ambush; Jannaeus nearly lost his life in the battle, and in its aftermath Moab and Gilead, two mountainous areas east of the Dead Sea and the Jordan River the Hasmoneans had conquered from the Nabataeans previously, were returned.

Around 86 BCE, the Seleucid ruler, Antiochus XII Dionysus, invaded Nabatea. During the Battle of Cana, Antiochus was slain and his demoralized army perished in the desert. Obodas achieved great renown for defeating both the Hasmoneans and the Greeks. He died shortly after the victory, possibly from wounds sustained during battle.

The many inscriptions discovered praising "Obodas the god" or "Zeus Obodas" have been interpreted as evidence of his veneration as a god, a notion advanced by the Byzantine writer Uranios in the sixth century who wrote of Obodas the king whom they worship as a god. Holy sites were dedicated to Obodas at both Ein Avdat and Petra, as recorded in still extant inscriptions. However, no tomb for Obodas I has yet been found, and some scholars speculate that worship of Obodat may have formed around a local deity for whom Obodas I, and Obodas II and III, were named, and spread to Petra, developing into a cult tradition which incorporated these historical figures and their exploits. Still other scholars contend that it was not Obodas I who was deified, but rather one of the successor kings who shared his name.

Obodas is presumed to have been buried in the Negev, at a place that was renamed in his honour, 'Abdeh, though his tomb remains unlocated. He was succeeded by his brother Aretas III.

== Inscriptions ==
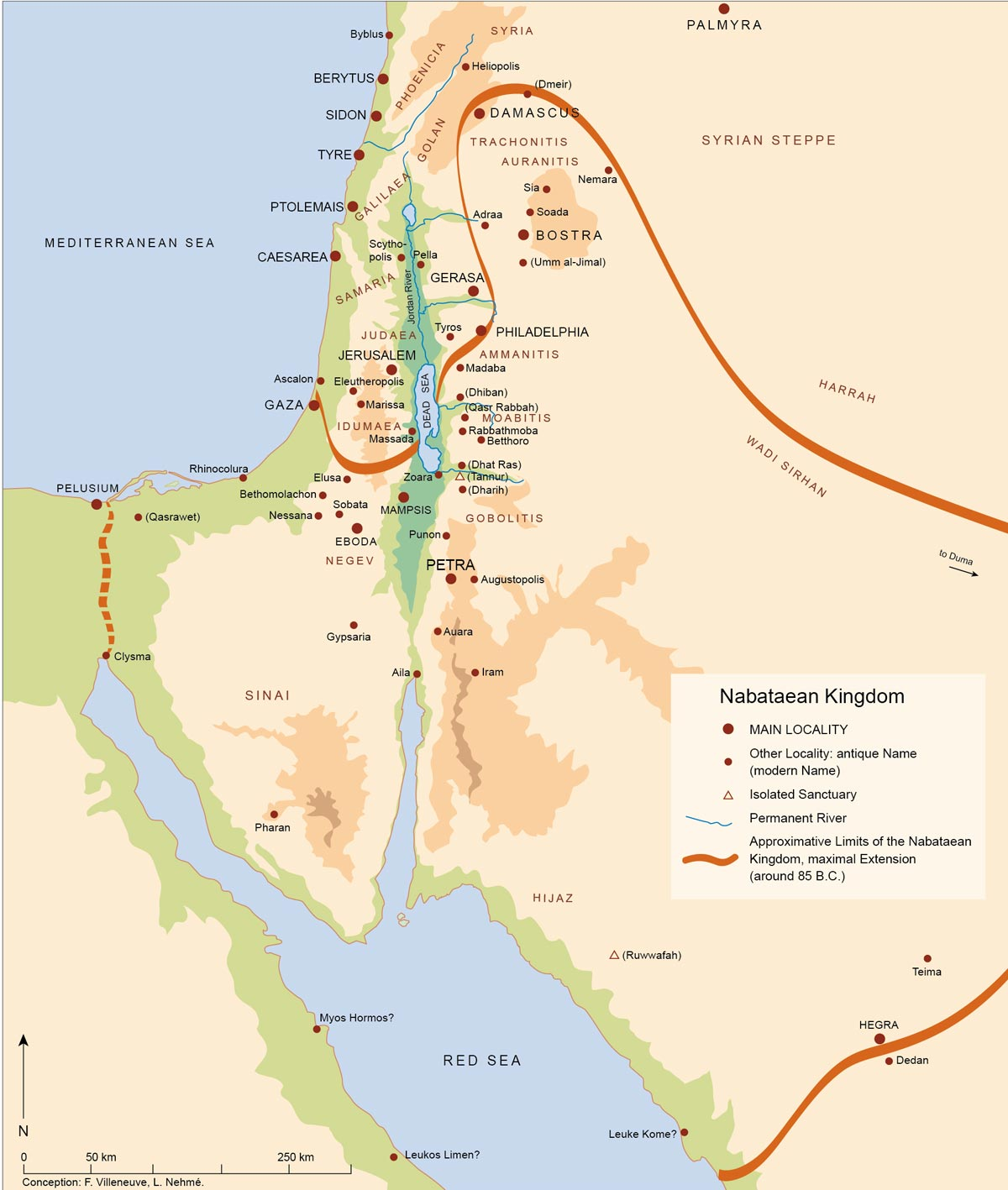
Map of the territory of the Nabataean kingdom c. 85 BC

Nabataeans wrote using a variation of the Aramaic script that they developed into Nabataean Aramaic, however, their spoken language - or at least one of the prominent ones used between them - was Arabic (more precisely Nabataean Arabic, a spoken dialect of Old Arabic). There are several inscriptions mentioning Obodas, most cut into stone, and at least one inscribed onto a bronze object.

=== Ein Avdat ('Abdeh) ===
A six-line inscription carrying the king's name was carved into a rock overlooking the gorge of Ein Avdat several kilometers to the north of where the ruins of the city of Abdeh lie. The script used is Nabataean Aramaic, and the first half of the inscription is in that language, while the last three are written in a colloquial form of the Arabic (Nabataean Arabic). There is some damage to the inscription that obscures half of the second line. The first three lines are translated by Moshe Sharon as follows:

"May he who reads be remembered in good memory before Obodas the god
And may he who wrote (also) be remembered ...
Garmalāhi son of Taymalāhi a statue before Obodas the god"

The next three lines in Arabic use a more poetic language and have challenged scholars seeking to translate them, particularly since the Nabataean alphabet could not represent all the sounds that exist in Arabic, and the similarity between the "d" and "r" letters in the Nabataean script complicates decipherment. One of the first translations and most cited is:

"And he acts neither for benefit nor for favor. And if death claims us
Let me not be claimed. And if affliction seeks, let it not seek us
Garmalāhi wrote with his hand"

The inscription is dated to no later than 150 CE, making it the oldest inscription in Arabic (using a non-Arabic alphabet) documented to date.

=== Petra ===
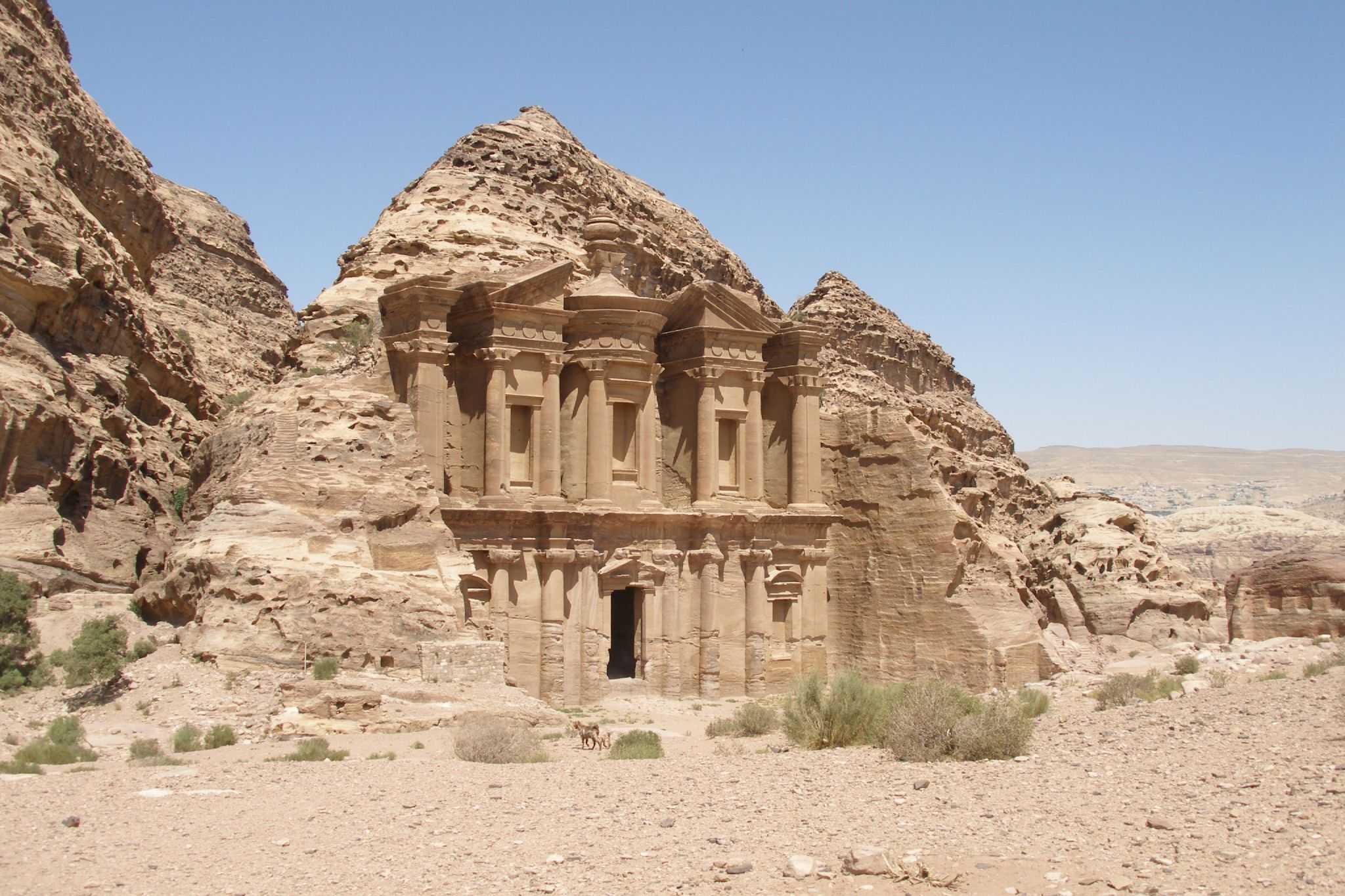
The Monastery (Arabic: Ad-Deir), Petra's largest monument, dating from the first century BC. Dedicated to Obodas I, it is believed to be the symposium of Obodas the god.

An inscription at Petra dedicated to the deity Dushara mentions Obodas and calls him "king of the Nabataeans" and "king of the Arabs", the same titles carried by his father Aretas II. Another inscription was found in a niche on the rockface above a cistern located opposite two other structures to the north of Ed-Deir, Petra while it was being cleaned in 1991. It mentions "the mrzh' of Obodat the god". Mrzh' is interpreted as a private religious group with a limited number of members. The inscription may be indication that the entire Deir complex was dedicated to a cult of worship centered around Obodat, a deity, or a deified king.

=== Bronze disc ===
A bronze disc carrying an inscription mentioning "Obodas the god" (lʿbdt ʾlhʾ) was discovered in Khirbet al-Falahat in Wadi Musa. The disc is speculated to have formed part of an incense oil burner or lamp, though no Nabataean examples of the complete item has yet been discovered. The lettering is inscribed on the outer edge of the object and is assumed to continue on the parts of the other parts of the burner or lamp that remain undiscovered. The English translation reads:

"This is the oil burner (or oil lamp?) and the summer vessel (?) which Zwyls the priest and his son 'Abd'obodat dedicated to Obodas the God in the temple of cult reliefs (?) in Gaia for the life of Rabbel the king, king of the Nabataeans who gives life and saves his people and for the life ..."

'Abd'obadat is a Nabataean personal name that appears in other dedicatory inscriptions and it means "servant of Obodat", and Abd is a common component in Arabic personal names.

== See also ==
- List of Nabataean kings
