= Hasmonean conquest of Gaza =

- Jonathan Apphus
Date	1st conquest ~145 BCE, Second Conquest ~96-94 BCE
Location	Gaza
Result	Hasmonean victories: Conquest of Gaza by the Hasmonean dynasty; Nabatean loss of their main Port
Territorial changes	Gaza incorporated into the Hasmonean dynasty

Belligerents
Hasmonean dynasty	Gazan population Nabataean Kingdom (Lost their main port)

Commanders and leaders
(Under selecuid influence); Jonathan Apphus (Independent Kingdom); Alexander Jannaeus	Unknown

The first conquest of Gaza occurred under Jonathan Apphus around ~145 BCE, when he was acting under Seleucid influence. The second conquest took place around ~96-94 BCE under Alexander Jannaeus, during the period when Judea was an independent kingdom. It and was fought between the Hasmoneans and the Gazan population.

== Battle ==
In 145 BCE, Jonathan Apphus initiated an attack on the city and conquered it, then under selecuid influence. Alexander Jannaeus succeeded in capturing, and incorporating Gaza into the Hasmonean dynasty as an independent kingdom, after a long siege.

Following the Hasmonean conquest of Idumea, Samaria, and Galilee, the focus shifted to the coastal plain. Cities like Akko and Jaffa in the north and Gaza in the south. Despite Gaza's alliance with the Nabateans, they didn't receive any aid. With Alexander Jannaeus' conquest of Gaza, the Nabateans lost their primary access to the Mediterranean Sea, as Gaza had served as their main port.

== Aftermath ==
Following this battle, Alexander Jannaeus would go on to fight the Nabateans again, at the Battle of Gadara in 93 BCE. After his defeat at this battle, Alexander would go home in anger. He demonstrated his displeasure against the Pharisees by refusing to perform the water libation ceremony properly. The crowd was shook, who would pelt him with citrons at. In return, he massacred 6,000 people in the temple courtyard, which would contribute to sparking the Judean Civil War.

== See More ==
Battle of Gadara
