= Lucius Julius Gainius Fabius Agrippa =

1st/2nd century Syrian Roman politician, teacher and priest

- gymnasiarch, Pontifex Maximus
- Born: 1st c.
- Died: 2nd c.
- Dynasty: Herodian dynasty
- Father: Gaius Julius Agrippa
- Mother: Fabia

Lucius Julius Gainius Fabius Agrippa, also known as Lucius Julius Agrippa, (Greek: Λεύκιος Ιούλιος Γαΐνιος Φάβιος Άγρίππας) was a considerably wealthy man who descended from royalty. He lived in the second half of the 1st century and early part of the 2nd century AD in the Roman Empire.

== Family, ancestry, and early life ==
Agrippa was a son of Cilician Prince Gaius Julius Agrippa (who served as a Quaestor for the Roman Province of Asia and before 109 served as a Praetorian Guard); his mother was a Roman woman who belonged or was related to the Fabia gens. His brother was a younger Gaius Julius Agrippa.

Agrippa was of Jewish, Nabataean, Edomite, Greek, Armenian, Median and Persian origins. Through his paternal grandfather, Herodian Prince and King of Cetis Cilicia Gaius Julius Alexander, Agrippa was a descendant of King Archelaus of Cappadocia; King of Judea Herod the Great; his wife Mariamne and King Tigranes VI of Armenia. Through his paternal grandmother, Princess and Queen of Cetis Cilicia Julia Iotapa, he was a direct descendant of Greek King Antiochus IV of Commagene and his sister-wife Greek Queen Julia Iotapa. Agrippa was an apostate to Judaism. However, his name indicates that the family connections with the Herodian dynasty were not wholly broken. It is unlikely but unknown if Agrippa attempted to exert influence on Judean politics.

Agrippa lived in and became a citizen of Apamea in Western Syria. Little is known of his early life. In his career, Agrippa served as a gymnasiarch and a Pontifex Maximus.

== Work in Apamea ==
In 115, Apamea suffered a serious earthquake. During this crisis, Agrippa served as the city's ambassador to Rome. At his own expense, Agrippa made various generous public benefactions to his community and frequently undertook embassies to the Roman Emperor and the Roman Senate. For six months, Agrippa paid for and distributed expensive olive oil for anointing and corn for public use in Apamea.

With his wealth, Agrippa assisted in the reconstruction of Apamea in the following ways:

- He financed the construction of an extension for the city's aqueduct.
- In 116–17, he bought sufficient land and financed the construction of the baths, an adjacent large hall, and a stoa. The large hall and stoa had lavish decorations and was used for concerts and competitions in music or oratory.
- He commissioned a number of bronze statues of Theseus and the Minotaur, as well as the ancient Greek god Apollo with the satyr Marsyas to be created. These statues were placed in the baths in Apamea which were part of a much larger complex.

== Legacy ==
There are a number of honorary inscriptions and decrees that have survived which were dedicated to Agrippa in Apamea and Rome. These honorary inscriptions and decrees date from 115–118. On the façade of the baths, Agrippa dedicated an inscription in Apamea to Gaius Julius Quadratus Bassus, the governor of Roman Syria. Other inscriptions in consoles attached to the pillars of the baths are dedications by Agrippa's slaves, freedmen, or clients.

At the Capitoline Hill in Rome, there is a bronze inscription dedicated to Agrippa. This inscription reveals that he undertook numerous voluntary liturgies. Below is an honorary decree that has survived on a base of a statue of Agrippa. The decree reads:

Lucius Julius Gainius Fabius Agrippa
The honored went to embassies at his own expense to the emperors, to Rome and to governors.

== Family tree of the Herodian dynasty ==
There are three princes by the name Phasael in the Herodian dynasty, all three mentioned by Josephus in "War" (BJ) and "Antiquities" (AJ):

- Phasael I, son of Antipater and Cypros (BJ 1.181; AJ 14.121)
- Phasael II, son of Phasael I (BJ 1.266; AJ 17.196)
- Phasael III, son of Herod the Great (BJ 1.181; AJ 14.121) and father of Cypros/Kypros, wife of Agrippa I

Antipater the Idumaean procurator of Judea
1.Doris; 2.Mariamne I 3.Mariamne II; 4.Malthace	Herod I the Great king of Judea	5.Cleopatra of Jerusalem; 6.Pallas; 7.Phaidra; 8.Elpis	Phasael governor of Jerusalem
(1) Antipater co-regent of Judaea	(2) Alexander I	(2) Aristobulus IV	(3) Herod II (Herod Philip)	(4) Herod Archelaus ethnarch of Judea, Idumea	(4) Herod Antipas tetrarch of Galilea & Perea	(5) Philip the Tetrarch of Iturea & Trachonitis
Tigranes V of Armenia	Alexander II	Herod Agrippa I king of Judea	Herod V ruler of Chalcis	Aristobulus Minor
Tigranes VI of Armenia	Herod Agrippa II king of Judea	Aristobulus ruler of Chalcis
Gaius Julius Alexander ruler of Cilicia
Gaius Julius Agrippa quaestor of Asia	Gaius Julius Alexander Berenicianus proconsul of Asia
Lucius Julius Gainius Fabius Agrippa gymnasiarch

== Sources ==
- roman-emperors.org
- Schwartz, Seth (1990). Josephus and Judaean politics. Columbia studies in the classical tradition. Leiden, New York: Brill. p. 137. ISBN 90-04-09230-7. OCLC 21595783.
- Bash, Anthony (1997). Ambassadors for Christ: an exploration of ambassadorial language in the New Testament, Mohr Siebeck
- Roller, Duane W. (1998). The Building Program of Herod the Great, University of California Press, ISBN 0-520-20934-6
- Kelly, Christopher (2006). The Roman Empire: a very short introduction, Oxford University Press
