= Gaius Julius Agrippa =

1st/2nd century Cilician prince and Roman senator

- senator, quaestor of Asia, (suffect) consul
- Born: c. 72
- Died: before 150
- Spouse: Fabia
- Issue: Gaius Julius Agrippa; Lucius Julius Gainius Fabius Agrippa
- Dynasty: Herodian dynasty
- Father: Gaius Julius Alexander
- Mother: Julia Iotapa (daughter of Antiochus IV)

Gaius Julius Agrippa (about 72 – before 150) was a Cilician Prince and the first-born son of King Gaius Julius Alexander and Queen Julia Iotapa of Cetis. He had two younger siblings: a brother called Gaius Julius Alexander Berenicianus and a sister called Julia Iotapa.

Surviving inscriptions on his family reveal that his family were related to important members of Asian, non-Jewish and Jewish aristocracy. He was of Jewish, Nabataean, Edomite, Greek, Armenian, Medes and Persian origins. His paternal grandparents were King Tigranes VI of Armenia and his wife Opgalli. Through Tigranes, he was a descendant of King Archelaus of Cappadocia, King of Judea Herod the Great and his wife Mariamne. Agrippa along with his family and paternal relatives were among the last known descendants of the Herodian Dynasty. He was an apostate to Judaism. It is unlikely that Agrippa attempted to exert influence on Judean Politics. His name indicates that the family connections from the Herodian Dynasty were not wholly broken. His maternal grandparents were King Antiochus IV of Commagene and Queen Julia Iotapa.

The Kingdom of Cetis was a small client state in the Roman Empire. Cetis was a small region in Cilicia that was previously ruled by his Cappadocian royal ancestors and Antiochus IV. The city in Cilicia Elaiussa Sebaste was a part of the Kingdom. When his parents married in Rome in 58, then Roman Emperor Nero crowned his parents as monarchs and gave them that region to rule. He was born, raised and educated in Cetis.

There is an honorific inscription dedicated to him as a ‘son of King Alexander’. In 94, Agrippa along with his brother Berenicianus entered the Roman Senate. Surviving inscriptions also reveal the career of Agrippa. Agrippa became and served as a Quaestor for the Roman Province of Asia. Before 109, Agrippa served as a Praetorian Guard, before his father reached and served as a consul or suffect consul.

Agrippa married a Roman woman who belonged or was related to the Fabia gens. From this marriage Agrippa had two sons, a younger Gaius Julius Agrippa and Lucius Julius Gainius Fabius Agrippa. A possible descendant from his family was the usurper of the 3rd century Jotapianus.

== Family tree of the Herodian dynasty ==
There are three princes by the name Phasael in the Herodian dynasty, all three mentioned by Josephus in "War" (BJ) and "Antiquities" (AJ):

- Phasael I, son of Antipater and Cypros (BJ 1.181; AJ 14.121)
- Phasael II, son of Phasael I (BJ 1.266; AJ 17.196)
- Phasael III, son of Herod the Great (BJ 1.181; AJ 14.121) and father of Cypros/Kypros, wife of Agrippa I

Antipater the Idumaean procurator of Judea
1.Doris; 2.Mariamne I 3.Mariamne II; 4.Malthace	Herod I the Great king of Judea	5.Cleopatra of Jerusalem; 6.Pallas; 7.Phaidra; 8.Elpis	Phasael governor of Jerusalem
(1) Antipater co-regent of Judaea	(2) Alexander I	(2) Aristobulus IV	(3) Herod II (Herod Philip)	(4) Herod Archelaus ethnarch of Judea, Idumea	(4) Herod Antipas tetrarch of Galilea & Perea	(5) Philip the Tetrarch of Iturea & Trachonitis
Tigranes V of Armenia	Alexander II	Herod Agrippa I king of Judea	Herod V ruler of Chalcis	Aristobulus Minor
Tigranes VI of Armenia	Herod Agrippa II king of Judea	Aristobulus ruler of Chalcis
Gaius Julius Alexander ruler of Cilicia
Gaius Julius Agrippa quaestor of Asia	Gaius Julius Alexander Berenicianus proconsul of Asia
Lucius Julius Gainius Fabius Agrippa gymnasiarch

== Sources ==
- roman-emperors.org
- acsearch.info ancient coin search engine: Kings of Armenia
- Schwartz, Seth (1990). Josephus and Judaean politics. Columbia studies in the classical tradition. Leiden, New York: Brill. p. 137. ISBN 90-04-09230-7. OCLC 21595783.
- Bash, Anthony (1997). Ambassadors for Christ: an exploration of ambassadorial language in the New Testament, Mohr Siebeck
- Roller, Duane W. (1998). The Building Program of Herod the Great, University of California Press, ISBN 0-520-20934-6
- Grainger, John D. (2003). Nerva and the Roman succession Crisis AD 96-99. London, New York: Routledge. pp. xvi. ISBN 0-415-28917-3. OCLC 52012210.
