= Gaius Julius Alexander Berenicianus =

2nd century Roman senator, consul and proconsul

- Senator, suffect consul, proconsul of Asia
- Born: c. 75
- Died: c. 150
- Spouse: Cassia Lepida
- Issue: Julia Cassia Alexandra
- Dynasty: Herodian dynasty
- Father: Gaius Julius Alexander
- Mother: Julia Iotapa (daughter of Antiochus IV)

Gaius Julius Alexander Berenicianus (Greek: Γάϊος Ίούλιος Άλέξανδρος Βερενικιανός; c. 75 – c. 150) was a Cilician Prince and second-born son to King Gaius Julius Alexander and Queen Julia Iotapa of Cetis. His eldest brother was Gaius Julius Agrippa and his younger sister was Julia Iotapa.

== Life ==
Surviving inscriptions about Berenicianus reveal that his family were related to important members of Asian, non-Jewish, and Jewish aristocracy. Berenicianus was of Jewish, Nabataean, Edomite, Greek, Armenian, Median and Persian origins. His paternal grandparents were King Tigranes VI of Armenia and his wife Opgalli. Through Tigranes, he was a descendant of King Archelaus of Cappadocia, as well as the King of Judea, Herod the Great, and his wife Mariamne. Agrippa along with his family and paternal relatives were among the last known descendants of the Herodian Dynasty. He was an apostate to Judaism. It is unlikely that Berenicianus attempted to exert influence on Judean politics. His name indicates that the family connections from the Herodian Dynasty were not wholly broken. His maternal grandparents were King Antiochus IV of Commagene and Queen Julia Iotapa.

The Kingdom of Cetis was a small client state in the Roman Empire, in Cilicia, that was previously ruled by his Cappadocian royal ancestors and Antiochus IV. The city of Elaiussa Sebaste was a part of the Kingdom. When his parents married in Rome in 58 AD, the Emperor Nero crowned his parents as monarchs and gave them that region to rule. He was born, raised, and educated in Cetis.

In 94, Berenicianus, along with Agrippa entered the Roman Senate. Surviving inscriptions also reveal the career of Berenicianus. He served as a suffect consul in 116. Between 132 and 133, he was Proconsul of the Roman Province of Asia, during which he appeared to have been a patron of the arts. (BCH 1, 1877, 291, no. 80)

He married Cassia Lepida (born c. 80), daughter of Cassius Lepidus (son of Gaius Cassius Longinus and Junia Lepida). Through her father and paternal grandmother, Cassia was a direct descendant of the Emperor Augustus. Berenicianus and Cassia had a daughter named Julia Cassia Alexandra (born c. AD 105), who married Gaius Avidius Heliodorus (born c. AD 100). Heliodorus was ab epistulis under the emperor Hadrian and praefectus Aegypti between AD 138 and 140. Heliodorus and Alexandra had children, including the usurper Avidius Cassius. A possible descendant of Berenicianus was the 3rd-century usurper Jotapianus.

== Family tree of the Herodian dynasty ==
There are three princes by the name Phasael in the Herodian dynasty, all three mentioned by Josephus in "War" (BJ) and "Antiquities" (AJ):

- Phasael I, son of Antipater and Cypros (BJ 1.181; AJ 14.121)
- Phasael II, son of Phasael I (BJ 1.266; AJ 17.196)
- Phasael III, son of Herod the Great (BJ 1.181; AJ 14.121) and father of Cypros/Kypros, wife of Agrippa I

Antipater the Idumaean procurator of Judea
1.Doris; 2.Mariamne I 3.Mariamne II; 4.Malthace	Herod I the Great king of Judea	5.Cleopatra of Jerusalem; 6.Pallas; 7.Phaidra; 8.Elpis	Phasael governor of Jerusalem
(1) Antipater co-regent of Judaea	(2) Alexander I	(2) Aristobulus IV	(3) Herod II (Herod Philip)	(4) Herod Archelaus ethnarch of Judea, Idumea	(4) Herod Antipas tetrarch of Galilea & Perea	(5) Philip the Tetrarch of Iturea & Trachonitis
Tigranes V of Armenia	Alexander II	Herod Agrippa I king of Judea	Herod V ruler of Chalcis	Aristobulus Minor
Tigranes VI of Armenia	Herod Agrippa II king of Judea	Aristobulus ruler of Chalcis
Gaius Julius Alexander ruler of Cilicia
Gaius Julius Agrippa quaestor of Asia	Gaius Julius Alexander Berenicianus proconsul of Asia
Lucius Julius Gainius Fabius Agrippa gymnasiarch

== Sources ==
- acsearch.info ancient coin search engine: Kings of Armenia
- Schwartz, Seth (1990). Josephus and Judaean politics. Columbia studies in the classical tradition. Leiden, New York: Brill. p. 137. ISBN 90-04-09230-7. OCLC 21595783.
- Grainger, John D. (2003). Nerva and the Roman succession Crisis AD 96-99. London, New York: Routledge. pp. xvi. ISBN 0-415-28917-3. OCLC 52012210.
- Burrell, Barbara (2004). Neokoroi: Greek Cities and Roman Emperors. Cincinnati classical studies, new ser. Vol. 9. Leiden, Boston: Brill. ISBN 90-04-12578-7. OCLC 53013513.
- Meckler, Michael L.; Christian Körner (1999-06-07). "De Imperatoribus Romanis: An Online Encyclopedia of Roman Emperors".

Political offices
Preceded by Decimus Terentius Gentianus, and L. Co[...] as suffect consuls	Suffect consul of the Roman Empire; AD 117 with Lucius Statius Aquila	Succeeded by Quintus Aquilius Niger, and Marcus Rebilus Apronianus as ordinary consuls
