= Gaius Julius Alexander =

1st century AD ruler of Cetis and Cilicia

ruler of Cetis, Cilicia
- Reign: 58 – 72
- Born: 1st c. AD
- Died: 2nd c. AD
- Spouse: Julia Iotapa (daughter of Antiochus IV)
- Issue: Gaius Julius Agrippa; Gaius Julius Alexander Berenicianus; Julia Iotapa (Cilician princess)
- Dynasty: Herodian dynasty
- Father: Tigranes VI of Armenia
- Mother: Opgalli

Gaius Julius Alexander II (Greek: Γαίος Ιούλιος Αλέξανδρος) was a Herodian prince who lived in the 1st century and 2nd century in the Roman Empire.

== Life ==
Alexander was of Jewish, Nabataean, Edomite, Greek, Armenian and Persian ancestry. He was the son of the Herodian prince, later king Tigranes VI of Armenia and his wife Opgalli. In the spring of 58, his father was crowned as king of Armenia by Roman Emperor Nero in Rome and ruled until 63. Alexander had a sister called Julia, who married the Anatolian Roman Senator Marcus Plancius Varus.

Alexander's paternal grandparents were the Judean prince Alexander and his wife whose name is unknown. Through his father, Alexander was the great-grandson of Cappadocian princess Glaphyra and Judean prince Alexander. He was the great-great-grandson of king Archelaus of Cappadocia, king of Judea Herod the Great and his wife Mariamne. Alexander along with his sister and father were the last of the known descendants of the kings of Cappadocia. Prior to the year 58, little is known on Alexander's life. It is unlikely that he attempted to exert influence on Judean politics.

Tigranes had arranged with king Antiochus IV of Commagene, with whom he was an ally, for the marriage of Alexander to Antiochus' daughter Julia Iotapa. The betrothal was held in Rome after Tigranes' coronation. After the betrothal, Nero crowned Alexander and Iotapa as Roman client rulers of the small Cilician region of Cetis, which had previously been ruled by Alexander's Seleucid ancestors, then by Archelaus of Cappadocia, and then by Archelaus of Cilicia and Antiochus IV. The Cilician city of Elaiussa Sebaste was made a part of their kingdom. Alexander and Iotapa ruled Cetis from 58 until at least 72.

Little is known about the marriage and reign of Alexander and Iotapa. Iotapa bore Alexander three children: two sons Gaius Julius Agrippa, Gaius Julius Alexander Berenicianus and a daughter Julia Iotapa. Their children were born and raised in Cetis. A possible descendant from their marriage was the usurper Jotapianus, who lived in the 3rd century. His name and the names Alexander gave his sons indicate that their family connections with the Herodian Dynasty were not wholly broken. Later in his life, Alexander had entered the Roman Senate and served as a suffect consul in 116.

== Family tree of the Herodian dynasty ==
There are three princes by the name Phasael in the Herodian dynasty, all three mentioned by Josephus in "War" (BJ) and "Antiquities" (AJ):

- Phasael I, son of Antipater and Cypros (BJ 1.181; AJ 14.121)
- Phasael II, son of Phasael I (BJ 1.266; AJ 17.196)
- Phasael III, son of Herod the Great (BJ 1.181; AJ 14.121) and father of Cypros/Kypros, wife of Agrippa I

Antipater the Idumaean procurator of Judea
1.Doris; 2.Mariamne I 3.Mariamne II; 4.Malthace	Herod I the Great king of Judea	5.Cleopatra of Jerusalem; 6.Pallas; 7.Phaidra; 8.Elpis	Phasael governor of Jerusalem
(1) Antipater co-regent of Judaea	(2) Alexander I	(2) Aristobulus IV	(3) Herod II (Herod Philip)	(4) Herod Archelaus ethnarch of Judea, Idumea	(4) Herod Antipas tetrarch of Galilea & Perea	(5) Philip the Tetrarch of Iturea & Trachonitis
Tigranes V of Armenia	Alexander II	Herod Agrippa I king of Judea	Herod V ruler of Chalcis	Aristobulus Minor
Tigranes VI of Armenia	Herod Agrippa II king of Judea	Aristobulus ruler of Chalcis
Gaius Julius Alexander ruler of Cilicia
Gaius Julius Agrippa quaestor of Asia	Gaius Julius Alexander Berenicianus proconsul of Asia
Lucius Julius Gainius Fabius Agrippa gymnasiarch

== Sources ==
- roman-emperors.org
- "Dictionary of Greek and Roman Biography and Mythology, page 424 (v. 2)"
- "Dictionary of Greek and Roman Biography and Mythology, page 614 (v. 2)"
- "Elaeousa Sebaste (Antiquity)". Encyclopedia of the Hellenic World.
- acsearch.info ancient coin search engine: Kings of Armenia
- Anthony Wagner, Pedigree and Progress, Essays in the Genealogical Interpretation of History, London, Philmore, 1975. Rutgers Alex CS4.W33
- Schwartz, Seth (1990). Josephus and Judaean politics. Columbia studies in the classical tradition. Leiden, New York: Brill. p. 137. ISBN 90-04-09230-7. OCLC 21595783.
- Grainger, John D. (2003). Nerva and the Roman succession Crisis AD 96-99. London, New York: Routledge. pp. xvi. ISBN 0-415-28917-3. OCLC 52012210.

Political offices
Preceded by Decimus Terentius Gentianus, and L. Co[...] as suffect consuls	Consul of the Roman Empire; AD 116 with Lucius Statius Aquila	Succeeded by Quintus Aquilius Niger, and Marcus Rebilus Apronianus as ordinary consuls
