= Phasael =

Brother of Herod the Great

Phasael (died 40 BCE; Hebrew: פַצָאֵל, romanized: Faṣā'ēl,; Latin: Phasaelus; from Greek: Φασάηλος, romanized: Phasaelos), was a prince from the Herodian Dynasty of Judea.

== Origins and early career ==
Phasael was born in the Hasmonean Kingdom to a Jewish aristocratic family of Edomite descent. His father, Antipater the Idumaean, was the close advisor of the Hasmonean king Hyrcanus II, and his mother Cypros was a Nabatean princess. Phasael was the elder brother of Herod.

Both Phasael and Herod began their careers under their father, Antipater, who was appointed procurator of Judea for the Roman Republic by Julius Caesar. Antipater appointed Phasael to be governor of Jerusalem, and Herod governor of Galilee. When Phasael's brother Herod was summoned to be tried by the Sanhedrin he meant to come to Jerusalem with an army and make war, however Antipater and Phasael managed to convince him to be satisfied with making threats of force.

While Mark Antony was in Bithynia about 41 BCE, accusations were brought before him against the two brothers, who were objects of hatred to many Jews, but the shrewd Herod succeeded in obtaining the dismissal of the charges. It was impossible, however, for the Sanhedrin to rest content with the administrations of Herod and Phasael; and charges were again brought against them before Antony at Antioch. Once more the accusations proved to be fruitless, for even the weak Hyrcanus II pleaded for them. This led Antony to appoint the pair tetrarchs.

== Revolt of Antigonus and Phasael's downfall ==
Meanwhile, Antigonus the Hasmonean endeavored to seize the Jewish throne; and in Jerusalem there were frequent conflicts between his retainers and those of the two brothers, which were especially perilous on the Jewish Feast of Shavuot. Phasael defended the walls, and Herod the palace, thus routing their antagonists, whereupon Antigonus invoked the aid of the Parthian Empire during the Pompeian–Parthian invasion of 40 BC. In spite of Herod's warning, Phasael allowed himself to be lured with Hyrcanus to the camp of the Parthian leader Barzapharnes under the pretext of peace talks. Both Hyrcanus and Phasael were imprisoned. They were then handed over to Antigonus, who mutilated Hyrcanus, a disgrace which Phasael escaped by bashing out his own brains. He had the satisfaction of knowing that before he died, his brother Herod had escaped from Jerusalem and was safe.

== Legacy ==
Josephus speaks of Phasael as a brave and noble man. His son, who likewise bore the name Phasael, and seems to have been posthumous, married Herod's daughter Salampsio, by whom he had five children. The son of Herod by his concubine, Pallas, was called Phasael by Herod, who likewise honored his brother's memory by naming a city northeast of Jericho "Phasaelis," and a tower of his palace at Jerusalem "Phasaelus."

== Family tree of the Herodian dynasty ==
There are three princes by the name Phasael in the Herodian dynasty, all three mentioned by Josephus in "War" (BJ) and "Antiquities" (AJ):

- Phasael I, son of Antipater and Cypros (BJ 1.181; AJ 14.121)
- Phasael II, son of Phasael I (BJ 1.266; AJ 17.196)
- Phasael III, son of Herod the Great (BJ 1.181; AJ 14.121) and father of Cypros/Kypros, wife of Agrippa I

Antipater the Idumaean procurator of Judea
1.Doris; 2.Mariamne I 3.Mariamne II; 4.Malthace	Herod I the Great king of Judea	5.Cleopatra of Jerusalem; 6.Pallas; 7.Phaidra; 8.Elpis	Phasael governor of Jerusalem
(1) Antipater heir of Judaea	(2) Alexander I prince of Judea	(2) Aristobulus IV prince of Judea	(3) Herod II Philip prince of Judea	(4) Herod Archelaus ethnarch of Judea, Idumea	(4) Herod Antipas tetrarch of Galilea & Perea	(5) Philip the Tetrarch of Iturea & Trachonitis
Tigranes V of Armenia	Alexander II prince of Judea	Herod Agrippa I king of Judea	Herod V ruler of Chalcis	Aristobulus Minor
Tigranes VI of Armenia	Herod Agrippa II king of Judea	Aristobulus ruler of Chalcis
Gaius Julius Alexander ruler of Cilicia
Gaius Julius Agrippa quaestor of Asia	Gaius Julius Alexander Berenicianus proconsul of Asia
Lucius Julius Gainius Fabius Agrippa gymnasiarch

== See also ==
- Herodian dynasty
- Herodian kingdom
- List of Hasmonean and Herodian rulers
