= Tigranes V of Armenia =

King of Armenia from 6 to 12 AD

Tigranes V
- King Of Armenia
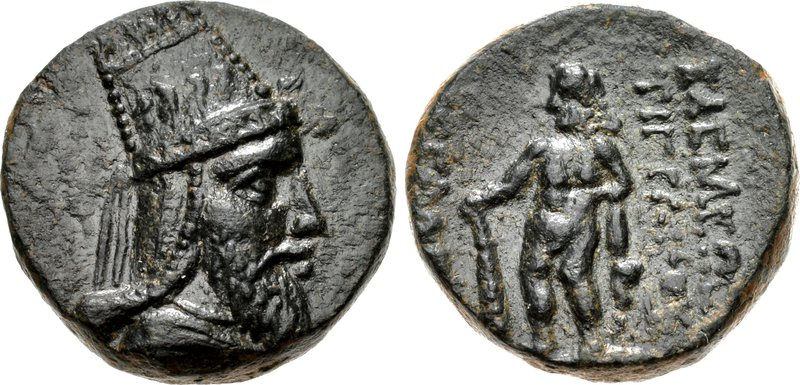
- Tigranes V

King of Armenia
- Reign: 6–12 AD
- Predecessor: Artavasdes IV
- Successor: Vonones I
- Co-ruler: Erato of Armenia
- Born: 16 BC
- Died: 36 AD
- Spouse: Erato of Armenia
- Dynasty: Herodian (paternal line); Artaxiad (maternal line)
- Father: Alexander
- Mother: Glaphyra

Tigranes V, also known as Tigran V (Greek: Τιγράνης, 16 BC – 36 AD) ruled as a Roman client king of Armenia from 6 AD to 12 AD. On his paternal side, he was a member of the Hasmonean branch of the Herodian dynasty.

== Family and life in the Herodian court ==
Tigranes was the first-born son of Alexander and Glaphyra. His younger brother was called Alexander and he also had a younger sister. His nephew Tigranes VI served as a Roman client king of Armenia during the reign of the Roman Emperor Nero. His father Alexander was a Judean prince and was a son of King of Judea Herod the Great and his wife Mariamne. His mother Glaphyra was a Cappadocian princess. She was the daughter of the King Archelaus of Cappadocia and her mother was from Armenia, possibly related to the Artaxiad dynasty.

Tigranes was named in honour of his mother's Armenian and Hellenic lineage. The name Tigranes was the most common royal name in the Artaxiad dynasty and was among the most ancient names of the Armenian Kings. Roman Emperor Augustus mentions Tigranes’ Armenian ancestry in his political testament:

When he was murdered I sent into that kingdom Tigranes [Tigrans V, ca. A.D. 6], who was sprung from the royal family of the Armenians.
[Res Gestae Divi Augusti, V. xxvi. pp.390/1]

Tigranes was born and raised in Herod's court in Jerusalem. After the death of Tigranes' father in 7 BC, Herod forced his mother to return to Cappadocia, leaving her children under the sole custody of Herod in Jerusalem. Tigranes and his brother remained under Herod's guardianship so he could be able to control their fates. Another son of Herod's, Antipater, was concerned for Tigranes and his brother as he expected them to attain higher stations, because of the assistance Antipater considered likely from their maternal grandfather Archelaus.

Herod died in 4 BC in Jericho. After the death of Herod, Tigranes and his brother decided to leave Jerusalem and to live with their mother and her family in the Cappadocian royal court. After Tigranes and his brother arrived in Cappadocia, they disowned their Jewish descent and religion and embraced their Greek descent and religion. Archelaus sent Tigranes to live and be educated in Rome.

== King of Armenia ==
Artavasdes IV was King of Armenia but was an unpopular ruler. In 6 AD he was murdered by his subjects. After the death of Artavasdes IV, Augustus revised his foreign policy and appointed Tigranes as King of Armenia. Tigranes was accompanied by Archelaus and Tiberius to Armenia, where he was installed as King at Artaxata. Artaxata became Tigranes' capital. Initially, Tigranes ruled Armenia as a sole ruler but the Armenian nobles were dissatisfied with this situation and restored Queen Erato back to the throne as Tigranes' co-ruler. Tigranes' co-rule with Erato is supported by numismatic evidence.

Little is known about his reign of Armenia although some coinage has survived from his reign. The surviving coinage reflects his Hellenic and Armenian descent and provides evidence that he relinquished his Jewish connections. His royal title is in Greek ΒΑΣΙΛΕΩΣ ΤΙΓΡΑΝΟΥ ΜΕΓΑΛΟΥ which means of great King Tigranes. In 12 AD, Erato and Tigranes were overthrown. Augustus kept Armenia as a client kingdom and appointed Vonones I of Parthia as King of Armenia.

== Life after being King of Armenia ==
After his time as king of Armenia, Tigranes remained in contention to reclaim his throne through to the first years of Roman Emperor Tiberius' reign. Around 18 AD Vonones I died. However, the kingdom of Armenia was given to Artaxias III.

Little is known about Tigranes' later life. His wife was the daughter of Pheroras, but they had no children. Pheroras was his paternal great-uncle and a brother to Herod. Tacitus records that Tigranes was a victim of the reign of terror that marked Tiberius' latter years. The charges brought against him by Tiberius in 36 AD are not known but it would seem that he did not survive them.

== Family tree of the Herodian dynasty ==
There are three princes by the name Phasael in the Herodian dynasty, all three mentioned by Josephus in "War" (BJ) and "Antiquities" (AJ):

- Phasael I, son of Antipater and Cypros (BJ 1.181; AJ 14.121)
- Phasael II, son of Phasael I (BJ 1.266; AJ 17.196)
- Phasael III, son of Herod the Great (BJ 1.181; AJ 14.121) and father of Cypros/Kypros, wife of Agrippa I

Antipater the Idumaean procurator of Judea
1.Doris; 2.Mariamne I 3.Mariamne II; 4.Malthace	Herod I the Great king of Judea	5.Cleopatra of Jerusalem; 6.Pallas; 7.Phaidra; 8.Elpis	Phasael governor of Jerusalem
(1) Antipater co-regent of Judaea	(2) Alexander I	(2) Aristobulus IV	(3) Herod II (Herod Philip)	(4) Herod Archelaus ethnarch of Judea, Idumea	(4) Herod Antipas tetrarch of Galilea & Perea	(5) Philip the Tetrarch of Iturea & Trachonitis
Tigranes V of Armenia	Alexander II	Herod Agrippa I king of Judea	Herod V ruler of Chalcis	Aristobulus Minor
Tigranes VI of Armenia	Herod Agrippa II king of Judea	Aristobulus ruler of Chalcis
Gaius Julius Alexander ruler of Cilicia
Gaius Julius Agrippa quaestor of Asia	Gaius Julius Alexander Berenicianus proconsul of Asia
Lucius Julius Gainius Fabius Agrippa gymnasiarch

== Sources ==
- Tacitus, Annals Book VI
- Millar, Fergus, Schürer, Emil, Vermes & Geza, The History of the Jewish People in the Age of Jesus Christ (175 B.C. - A.D. 135), Continuum International Publishing Group, 1973
- H. Temporini & W. Haase, Aufstieg und Niedergang der römischen Welt: Geschichte und Kultur Roms im spiegel der neueren Forschung, Walter de Gruyter, 1977
- H. Temporini & W. Haase, Aufstieg und Niedergang der römischen Welt: Geschichte und Kultur Roms im Spiegel der neueren Forschung, Walter de Gruyter, 1980
- R. Syme & A.R. Birley, Anatolica: studies in Strabo, Oxford University Press, 1995
- A.E. Redgate, The Armenians, Wiley-Blackwell, 2000
- R.G. Hovannisian, The Armenian People from Ancient to Modern Times, Volume 1: The Dynastic Periods: From Antiquity to the Fourteenth Century, Palgrave Macmillan, 2004
- D. Dueck, H. Lindsay & S. Pothecary, Strabo's cultural geography: the making of a kolossourgia, Cambridge University Press, 2005
- A. Kasher & E. Witztum, King Herod: a persecuted persecutor: a case study in psychohistory and psychobiography, Walter de Gruyter, 2007
- Marriage and Divorce in the Herodian Family: A Case Study of Diversity in Late Second Temple Judaism by Ingrid Johanne Moen Department of Religion in the Graduate School of Duke University
- acsearch.info ancient coin search engine: Kings of Armenia
- Eisenman's "New Testament Code", Chapter 4

Tigranes V of Armenia Herodian dynasty Born: 16 BC Died: 36 AD
Regnal titles
Preceded by Artavasdes IV	King of Armenia; 6 – 12 AD	Succeeded by Vonones I
