= Aristobulus of Chalcis =

1st-century AD king of Chalcis and Lesser Armenia

Aristobulus V
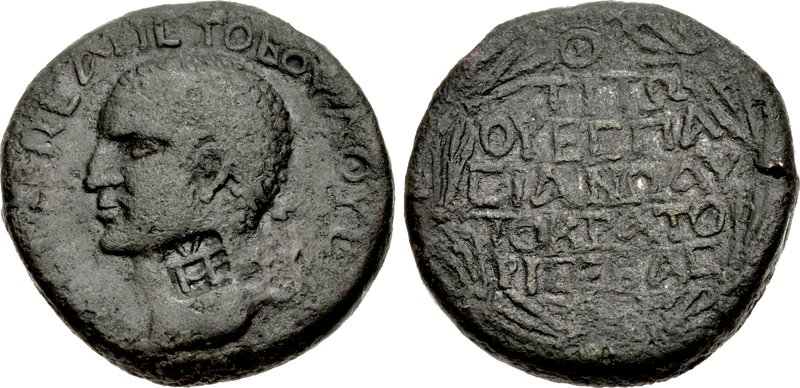

King of Lesser Armenia
- Reign: 55–72

Tetrarch of Chalcis
- Reign: 57–92
- Predecessor: Agrippa II (indirect)
- Died: 92 AD
- Spouse: Salome
- Issue: Herod; Agrippa; Aristobulus
- Dynasty: Herodian
- Father: Herod V
- Mother: Mariamne

Aristobulus V of Chalcis (Ancient Greek: Ἀριστόβουλος) was a son of Herod of Chalcis and his first wife Mariamne. Herod of Chalcis, ruler of Chalcis in Iturea, was a grandson of Herod the Great through his father, Aristobulus IV. Mariamne was a granddaughter of Herod the Great through her mother, Olympias; hence Aristobulus was a great-grandson of Herod the Great on both sides of his family.

== Life ==
Aristobulus was married to his first cousin Salome after the death of her first husband, Philip the Tetrarch. With her Aristobulus had three sons: Herod, Agrippa, and Aristobulus Three coins with portraits of him and Salome have been found.

Aristobulus did not directly succeed his father as ruler of the Chalcis. Rather, upon his father's death in 48 AD, the emperor Claudius gave the realm to Aristobulus' first cousin, Herod Agrippa II, but only as a tetrarchy. In 53 AD Agrippa II was forced to renounce the rule over tetrarchy of Chalcis, but he was given the title of king and rule over the territories previously governed by Philip the Tetrarch (also known as Herod Philip II) and Lysanias instead. Subsequently, Aristobulus was given tetrarchy of Chalcis in 57 AD. He reigned in Chalcis until 92 AD, when, according to the coins, the territory became part of the Roman province Syria.

He has been identified with the Aristobulus appointed by Nero as King of Armenia Minor in 55 AD, who participated with his forces in the Roman–Parthian War of 58–63, receiving a small portion of Greater Armenia in exchange. This Aristobulus was displaced from Armenia Minor in 72 AD, but is thought to be the "Aristobulus of Chalcidice" who supported Lucius Caesennius Paetus, proconsul of Syria, in the war against Antiochus of Commagene in 73 AD, and was in consequence compensated with a new kingdom, "probably Chalcis ad Belum" (modern Qinnasrin, in northern Syria). Assuming all these Aristobuli were indeed the same person, he would seem to have been ruler, at various times, of the Iturean Chalcis, Armenia Minor, and Chalcis ad Belum.

== Family tree of the Herodian dynasty ==
There are three princes by the name Phasael in the Herodian dynasty, all three mentioned by Josephus in "War" (BJ) and "Antiquities" (AJ):

- Phasael I, son of Antipater and Cypros (BJ 1.181; AJ 14.121)
- Phasael II, son of Phasael I (BJ 1.266; AJ 17.196)
- Phasael III, son of Herod the Great (BJ 1.181; AJ 14.121) and father of Cypros/Kypros, wife of Agrippa I

Antipater the Idumaean procurator of Judea
1.Doris; 2.Mariamne I 3.Mariamne II; 4.Malthace	Herod I the Great king of Judea	5.Cleopatra of Jerusalem; 6.Pallas; 7.Phaidra; 8.Elpis	Phasael governor of Jerusalem
(1) Antipater co-regent of Judaea	(2) Alexander I	(2) Aristobulus IV	(3) Herod II (Herod Philip)	(4) Herod Archelaus ethnarch of Judea, Idumea	(4) Herod Antipas tetrarch of Galilea & Perea	(5) Philip the Tetrarch of Iturea & Trachonitis
Tigranes V of Armenia	Alexander II	Herod Agrippa I king of Judea	Herod V ruler of Chalcis	Aristobulus Minor
Tigranes VI of Armenia	Herod Agrippa II king of Judea	Aristobulus ruler of Chalcis
Gaius Julius Alexander ruler of Cilicia
Gaius Julius Agrippa quaestor of Asia	Gaius Julius Alexander Berenicianus proconsul of Asia
Lucius Julius Gainius Fabius Agrippa gymnasiarch

== See also ==
- Herodian dynasty
- Herodian kingdom
- List of Hasmonean and Herodian rulers
- 1st century in Lebanon

Aristobulus of Chalcis House of Herod
New title	King of Armenia Minor; 55–72	Annexed by Rome
Vacant Title last held by Agrippa II	Tetrarch of Chalcis; 57–92	Title extinct
