= Alexander (grandson of Herod the Great) =

1st century AD Prince of Judea

prince of Judea
- Born: 15 BC
- Died: 26–28 AD
- Issue: Tigranes VI of Armenia
Names
- Gaius Julius Alexander
- Dynasty: Herodian dynasty
- Father: Alexander, son of Herod
- Mother: Glaphyra

Alexander II, also known by his Roman name Gaius Julius Alexander (Greek: Γαίος Ιούλιος Αλέξανδρος, 15 BC-probably between 26 and 28 AD) was a Herodian prince.

== Family ==
Alexander was the second born son of Alexander and Glaphyra. His oldest brother was called Tigranes and had a younger unnamed sister. His father Alexander was a Judean prince, of Jewish, Nabataean and Edomite descent and was a son of the King of Judea, Herod the Great and his wife Mariamne. His mother Glaphyra was a Cappadocian princess, who was of Greek, Armenian and Persian descent. She was the daughter of the King Archelaus of Cappadocia and her mother was an unnamed princess from Armenia, possibly a relation of the Artaxiad dynasty. Alexander's name reflected his Hasmonean and Hellenic lineage.

== Life ==
Alexander was born and raised in Herod's court in Jerusalem. After the death and burial of Alexander's father in 7 BC, Herod forced Alexander's mother to return to Cappadocia, forcing her to leave her children under the sole custody of Herod in Jerusalem. Alexander and his brother remained under Herod's guardianship so he could control their fates. Another son of Herod's, Antipater, was concerned for Alexander and his brother as he expected them to attain higher station than their own late fathers, because of the assistance Antipater considered likely from their maternal grandfather Archelaus. In the time Alexander lived in Herod's court, he was betrothed to the daughter of Pheroras. Pheroras was Alexander's paternal great-uncle and was Herod's brother. Antipater persuaded Herod to call off Alexander's betrothal to Pheroras’ daughter because Antipater convinced his father that closer ties between Pheroras and Archelaus of Cappadocia were liable to develop into a plot against Herod.

After the death of Herod in 4 BC in Jericho, Alexander and his brother decided to leave Jerusalem and to live with their mother and her family in Cappadocia. After Alexander and his brother arrived in Cappadocia, they disavowed their Jewish descent, deserted their Jewish religion and embraced their Greek descent, including the religion. However, the family connections to the Herodian dynasty were not wholly broken. After Alexander and his brother disavowed their Jewish descent, they were considered among fellow Jews as gentiles. There is a possibility that his maternal grandfather sent Alexander to be educated in Rome.

Little is known of the adult life of Alexander. He appeared to be an administrator for the extensive land estates in Egypt that were owned by the imperial family of Rome. He was a wealthy landowner in his own right, owing two estates in the Egyptian town of Euhemeria. Alexander married an unnamed noblewoman who bore him a son called Tigranes. Alexander named his son in honour of his brother. Tigranes later served as a Roman client king of Armenia under the reign of Roman Emperor Nero (reigned 54–68). Roman Empress Livia Drusilla and her daughter-in-law Antonia Minor were mentioned in Alexander's will.

== Family tree of the Herodian dynasty ==
There are three princes by the name Phasael in the Herodian dynasty, all three mentioned by Josephus in "War" (BJ) and "Antiquities" (AJ):

- Phasael I, son of Antipater and Cypros (BJ 1.181; AJ 14.121)
- Phasael II, son of Phasael I (BJ 1.266; AJ 17.196)
- Phasael III, son of Herod the Great (BJ 1.181; AJ 14.121) and father of Cypros/Kypros, wife of Agrippa I

Antipater the Idumaean procurator of Judea
1.Doris; 2.Mariamne I 3.Mariamne II; 4.Malthace	Herod I the Great king of Judea	5.Cleopatra of Jerusalem; 6.Pallas; 7.Phaidra; 8.Elpis	Phasael governor of Jerusalem
(1) Antipater co-regent of Judaea	(2) Alexander I	(2) Aristobulus IV	(3) Herod II (Herod Philip)	(4) Herod Archelaus ethnarch of Judea, Idumea	(4) Herod Antipas tetrarch of Galilea & Perea	(5) Philip the Tetrarch of Iturea & Trachonitis
Tigranes V of Armenia	Alexander II	Herod Agrippa I king of Judea	Herod V ruler of Chalcis	Aristobulus Minor
Tigranes VI of Armenia	Herod Agrippa II king of Judea	Aristobulus ruler of Chalcis
Gaius Julius Alexander ruler of Cilicia
Gaius Julius Agrippa quaestor of Asia	Gaius Julius Alexander Berenicianus proconsul of Asia
Lucius Julius Gainius Fabius Agrippa gymnasiarch

== Sources ==
- Millar, Fergus, Schürer, Emil, Vermes & Geza, The History of the Jewish People in the Age of Jesus Christ (175 B.C. – A.D. 135), Continuum International Publishing Group, 1973
- H. Temporini & W. Haase, Aufstieg und Niedergang der römischen Welt: Geschichte und Kultur Roms im spiegel der neueren Forschung, Walter de Gruyter, 1977
- H. Temporini & W. Haase, Aufstieg und Niedergang der römischen Welt: Geschichte und Kultur Roms im Spiegel der neueren Forschung, Walter de Gruyter, 1980
- R. Syme & A.R. Birley, Anatolica: studies in Strabo, Oxford University Press, 1995
- A.E. Redgate, The Armenians, Wiley-Blackwell, 2000
- Ciecieląg Jerzy, Polityczne dziedzictwo Heroda Wielkiego. Palestyna w epoce rzymsko-herodiańskiej, Kraków 2002, s. 116–118.
- D. Dueck, H. Lindsay & S. Pothecary, Strabo's cultural geography: the making of a kolossourgia, Cambridge University Press, 2005
- A. Kasher & E. Witztum, King Herod: a persecuted persecutor: a case study in psychohistory and psychobiography, Walter de Gruyter, 2007
- Eisenman's "New Testament Code", Chapter 4
- Marriage and Divorce in the Herodian Family: A Case Study of Diversity in Late Second Temple Judaism by Ingrid Johanne Moen Department of Religion in the Graduate School of Duke University
