= Antipater the Idumaean =

Father of Herod the Great

Antipater I
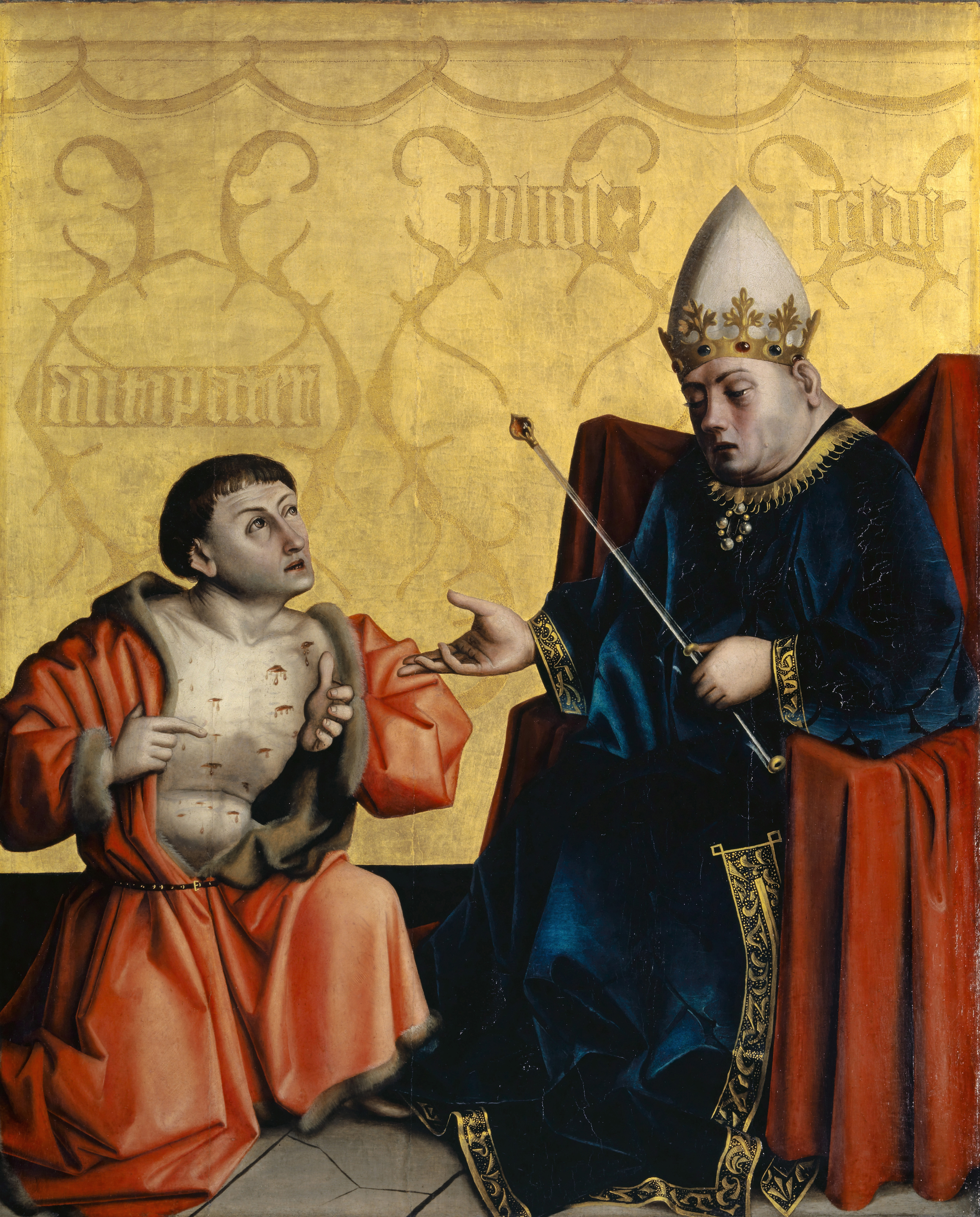
- Antipater before Julius Caesar, by Konrad Witz (1435)
- Born: 113 or 114 BCE; Edom
- Died: 43 BCE (aged 69–70)
- Spouse: Cypros
- Issue: Herod the Great; Phasael; Pheroras; Salome I
- Ancient Greek: Αντίπατρος
- Hebrew: אָנְטִיפָּטְרוּס
- House: Herodian dynasty
- Father: Antipas
- Religion: Judaism

Antipater I the Idumaean (Note: (/ænˈtɪpətər/; Ancient Greek: Αντίπατρος, romanized: Antípatros, Hebrew: אָנְטִיפָּטְרוּס ‘Ānṭīpāṭrūs) (114 or 113 BCE – 43 BCE) was the founder of the Herodian dynasty and father of Herod the Great. According to Josephus, he was the son of Antipas (Note: (Ancient Greek: Αντίπας, romanized: Antípas; Hebrew: אנטיפס)) and had formerly held that name. A native of Idumaea (a region southeast of Judah in which the Edomites settled during the classical period) Antipater became a powerful official under the later Hasmonean kings and subsequently became a client of Roman General Pompey when Pompey conquered Judah in the name of the Roman Republic.

After Julius Caesar defeated Pompey at the Battle of Pharsalus, Antipater sided with Caesar during the Roman Civil War. During Caesar's Egyptian campaign, Antipater joined Mithridates of Pergamon's army marching to rescue Caesar in Alexandria. Caesar made him chief minister of Judea, as Judah became known to the Romans, with the right to collect taxes. Eventually Caesar made Antipater's sons Phasaelus and Herod the governors of Jerusalem and Galilee, respectively. After the assassination of Caesar, Antipater was forced to side with the Liberators against the Caesarians. The pro-Roman politics of Antipater led to his increasing unpopularity among the devout, non-Hellenised Jews. He died by poison. The diplomacy and artful politics of Antipater, as well as his insinuation into the Hasmonean court, paved the way for the rise of his son Herod the Great, who used this position to marry the Hasmonean princess Mariamne, endear himself to Rome and become king of Judea under Roman influence.

== Background ==
Though historians understand that Antipater's family had converted to Judaism in the second century BCE, different stories circulated in the wake of his sons coming to power. They demonstrate the tensions that existed between the Jewish people and the powerful Edomites who appear at this time. Nicolaus of Damascus, the court historian for Herod the Great, wrote that Herod's ancestors were among the historical elite in Jerusalem who had been taken by King Nebuchadnezzar into Babylonian captivity in the sixth century BCE. This account serves two purposes; when the Persian King Cyrus sent the captives in Babylon back to Judea, it is likely that some chose to settle elsewhere. A legitimate dispersion such as this would shroud the fact that Herod's ancestry is undocumented in the meticulous records of returned Jewish families. Claiming a heritage among the Jews from as early as the Babylonian captivity provides credibility for a pro-Roman and Hellenized Herod as a king over the Jews, for they were highly contemptuous of him. Josephus explains this rendering by critiquing its author: Nicolaus wrote to please Herod and would do so at the cost of truthfulness.

Instead Josephus explains that Antipater's family converted to Judaism during the forced conversions by the Sadducee-influenced Hasmonean leader John Hyrcanus. Hyrcanus threatened that any Idumaean who wished to maintain their land would need to be circumcised and enter into the traditions of the Jews. Josephus acknowledges Herod as being "by birth a Jew" and Antipater as being "of the same people" with the Jews. Nevertheless, this influential family came to be resented by many Jews for their Edomite ancestry, a fact used by the Hasmoneans and their supporters against them. As such, in a polemic against Herod to discredit him in the eyes of the Romans as unfit to become king of the Jews, Antigonus the Hasmonean is quoted by Josephus as referring to Herod as "no more than a private man, and an Idumean, i.e. a half Jew".

Early Church Fathers often portray Herod polemically, and as such, their accounts of his familial origin reflected poetic license in place of historical accuracy. According to Sextus Julius Africanus, Antipater's father was named Herod, not Antipas, Epiphanius of Salamis furthered this claim by writing Antipas was the name of this Herod's father. Neither of these genealogies are accepted by scholars. Per Africanus, Antipater was a hierodule of Apollo at a temple in Ashkelon where his father served as priest. To explain Antipater's Idumaean character, Africanus claims Antipater was kidnapped by the Idumeans, and following his father's failure to pay ransom, he was taken down to Idumaea proper where he was raised in the teachings of Judaism.

Antipater married Cypros, a Nabataean noblewoman, which helped endear the Nabateans to him. Their marriage helped bring about a close friendship between him and King Aretas to whom Cypros was related. The two men had such a relationship that Antipater entrusted his children to his friend when he went to war with the Hasmonean Aristobulus II. They had four sons: Phasael, Herod, Joseph, and Pheroras, and a daughter, Salome, one of several Salomes among the Herodians. Antipater also had a brother named Phalion, who was killed in battle against Aristobulus at Papyron.

Antipater served as a governor of Idumea under King Alexander Jannaeus and Queen Salome Alexandra, the parents of the feuding heirs. Josephus writes that he was a man of great authority among the Idumeans, both wealthy and born into a dignified family. Indeed, it is clear in the various forms of assistance that Antipater provides to both Hyrcanus II, brother of Aristobulus, and the Romans, that he possessed great resources and brilliant military and political capabilities.

== The end of the Hasmonean dynasty ==
Antipater laid the foundation for Herod's ascension to the throne of Judea partly through his activities in the court of the Hasmoneans, the heirs of the Maccabees, who were the hereditary leaders of the Jews, and partly by currying favor with the Romans who were growing more involved and dominant over the region at this time.

Soon after Hyrcanus succeeded his widowed mother as ruler and took the office of the high priest, he was attacked by his brother and surrendered. Hyrcanus agreed to retire from public life. Antipater, who seems to have succeeded his father as governor of Idumæa, had reason to fear that King Aristobulus would not retain him in this position. Antipater was known as a seditious and trouble-making man, and he exploited the weak-willed Hyrcanus for the sake of his ambition. After Hyrcanus stepped down, Antipater persuaded him to contend against his brother for his rightful position and even convinced the unsuspecting and reluctant Hyrcanus that his younger brother intended to kill him. He arranged for Hyrcanus to come under the protection of King Aretas III in Petra. Together they attacked Aristobulus in Jerusalem, and there was a great upheaval that drew the attention of Marcus Aemilius Scaurus, the Roman magistrate Pompey had assigned to the eastern Mediterranean province.

Although Pompey and his lieutenant Scaurus initially ruled in Aristobulus’ favor when the brothers brought their case forward, on the third intervention Pompey ordered the brothers to wait. Aristobulus impatiently provoked a political offense that brought Pompey to appoint Hyrcanus the ethnarch of Judea. Hyrcanus proved ineffective as either an administrator, or more importantly, as tax collector. Antipater was able to insinuate himself into a position of influence, and soon exercised the authority that ostensibly belonged to Hyrcanus as high priest. Antipater recognized Rome's growing dominance in the region and exploited it to his advantage. Due to his loyalty to Rome and reliability as a statesman, he was placed in charge of Judea, with responsibilities and privileges that included mediating civil disturbance and tax collecting.

== Roman procurator and appointments of sons ==
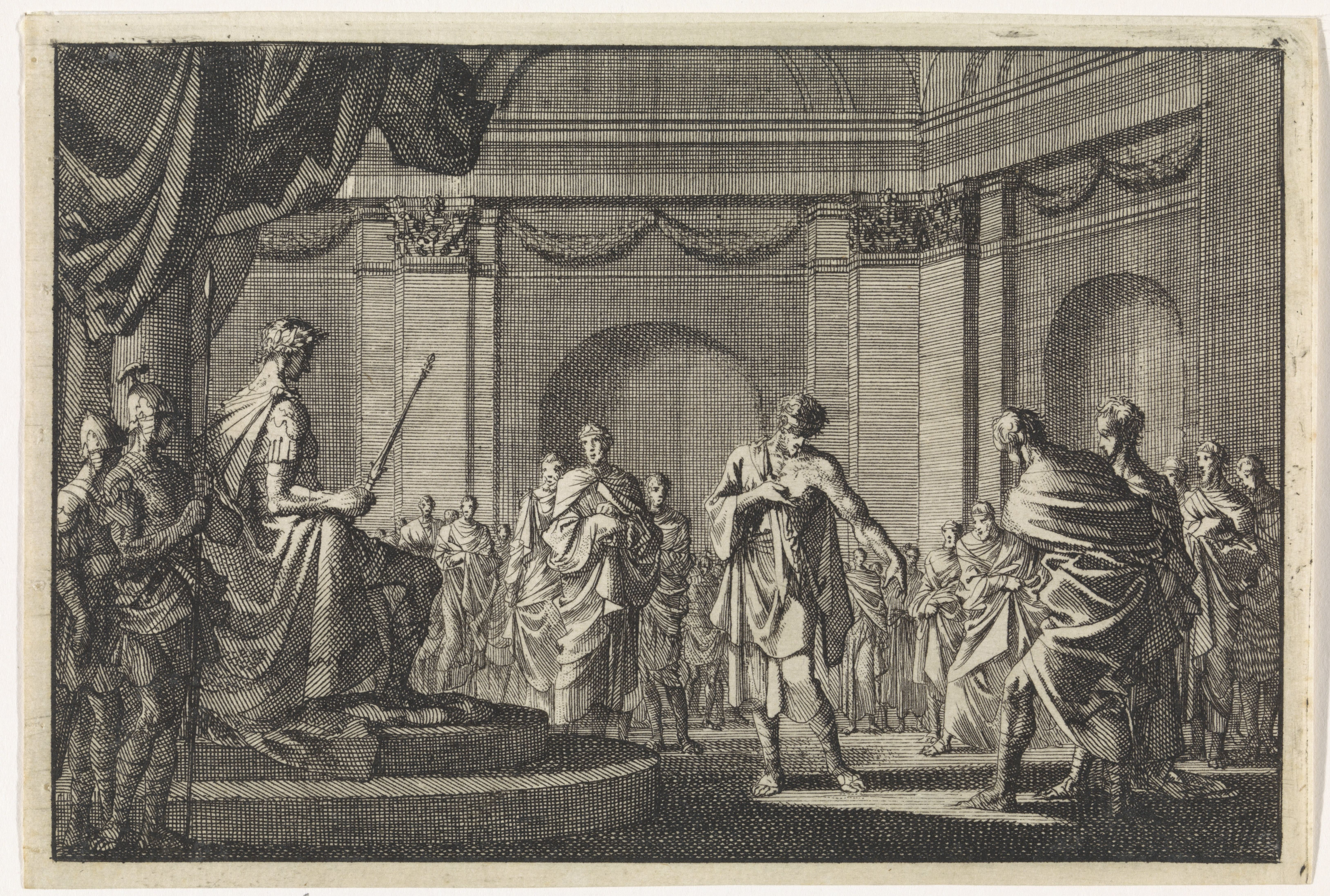
Antipater shows Caesar his scars, by Jan Luyken (1704)

With Hyrcanus established, Antipater thrived and laid the foundation for his family's success by navigating conflicts of loyalty and power-shifting within the Roman elite. When Julius Caesar and Pompey went to war in 49/48 BCE, Antipater at first sided with Pompey; when Pompey was defeated at the Battle of Pharsalus, Antipater shifted his allegiance to Caesar. While Caesar was besieged in Alexandria in 47 BCE, Antipater and Mithridates of Pergamon rescued him with 13,000 men and the aid of numerous nearby friends. For his "demonstrations of valor" Caesar elevated Antipater to Roman citizenship, freed him from taxes, and showered him with honors and declarations of friendship.

Later when accused by Aristobulus’ son, Antigonus, who returned from Roman bondage to contest for power, Antipater made a great scene of his scars from fighting for Caesar's life in Egypt. He defended himself with a history of unfailing loyalty to the Romans. This appeal persuaded Caesar who then appointed Antipater the first Roman procurator of Judea. This amity allowed the Jews a special degree of protection and freedom to govern themselves and enjoy Rome's good will. Josephus notes that with his newfound rights and honors, Antipater immediately began to rebuild the wall of Jerusalem that Pompey had destroyed when subduing Aristobulus. He established order by tempering civil disturbances in Judea and threatening to become a "severe master instead of a gentle governor" should the people grow seditious and unruly. Matters in Judea were finally calm for a time.

At this time came the defining point in Antipater's legacy, whereby he made his sons, Phasael, governor of Jerusalem, and Herod governor of Galilee, to the north of Samaria between the Sea of Galilee and Mediterranean. Herod quickly set about ridding Galilee of what his court historian calls "robbers," although they may also have been people resisting Roman rule. His activities eventually resulted in complaints raised with the Sanhedrin.

== Assassination and legacy ==
After the assassination of Julius Caesar, Antipater was forced to side with Cassius against Mark Antony. When Cassius came to Syria to collect troops, he began to demand harsh tributes, so much so that some entire cities and city curators were sold into slavery. Cassius demanded 700 talents out of Judea, so Antipater split the cost between his two sons. One aristocrat tasked with collecting tribute was Malichus, who disdained Antipater and enraged Cassius by not collecting with haste. However, Antipater saved Malichus from death by expending 100 talents of his own and placating Cassius’ anger.

Although Antipater saved Malichus' life a second time from a different ruler, Malichus continued to despise Antipater and seek his murder. Josephus presents two opposing reasons, one which would help secure Hyrcanus against the rising threat of Herod, and the other being his desire to quickly dispose of Hyrcanus and take power himself. He devised multiple assassination attempts which Antipater evaded, but he successfully bribed one of Hyrcanus’ cup-bearers to poison and kill Antipater.

Antipater's work as power-broker between the Hasmoneans, the Arabians, and the Romans inaugurated dramatic dynamics and steep changes in the history of the Jewish nation. The diplomacy and artful politics of Antipater produced the Herodian dynasty; he paved the way for the rise of his son Herod the Great, who married the Hasmonean princess Mariamne, endeared himself to Rome, and usurped the Judean throne to become king of Judea under Roman influence.

== Family tree of the Herodian dynasty ==
There are three princes by the name Phasael in the Herodian dynasty, all three mentioned by Josephus in "War" (BJ) and "Antiquities" (AJ):

- Phasael I, son of Antipater and Cypros (BJ 1.181; AJ 14.121)
- Phasael II, son of Phasael I (BJ 1.266; AJ 17.196)
- Phasael III, son of Herod the Great (BJ 1.181; AJ 14.121) and father of Cypros/Kypros, wife of Agrippa I

Antipater the Idumaean procurator of Judea
1.Doris; 2.Mariamne I 3.Mariamne II; 4.Malthace	Herod I the Great king of Judea	5.Cleopatra of Jerusalem; 6.Pallas; 7.Phaidra; 8.Elpis	Phasael governor of Jerusalem
(1) Antipater co-regent of Judaea	(2) Alexander I	(2) Aristobulus IV	(3) Herod II (Herod Philip)	(4) Herod Archelaus ethnarch of Judea, Idumea	(4) Herod Antipas tetrarch of Galilea & Perea	(5) Philip the Tetrarch of Iturea & Trachonitis
Tigranes V of Armenia	Alexander II	Herod Agrippa I king of Judea	Herod V ruler of Chalcis	Aristobulus Minor
Tigranes VI of Armenia	Herod Agrippa II king of Judea	Aristobulus ruler of Chalcis
Gaius Julius Alexander ruler of Cilicia
Gaius Julius Agrippa quaestor of Asia	Gaius Julius Alexander Berenicianus proconsul of Asia
Lucius Julius Gainius Fabius Agrippa gymnasiarch

== See also ==
- Herodian kingdom
- List of Hasmonean and Herodian rulers
