= Alexander, son of Herod =

Alexander
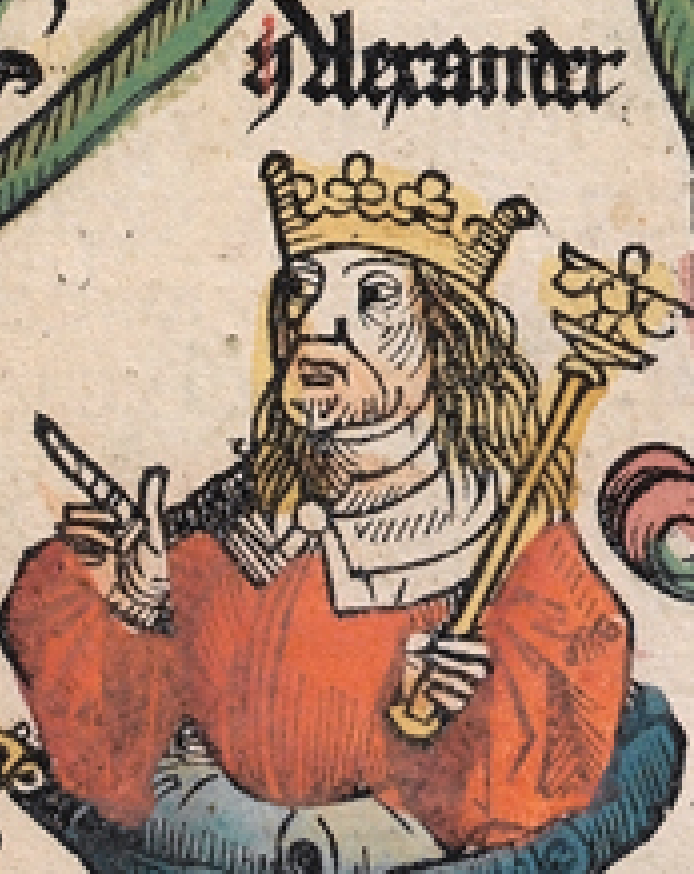
- Alexander, depicted in the 1493 Nuremberg Chronicle

heir of Judea
- Born: c. 35 BC
- Died: c. 7 BC
- Spouse: Glaphyra
- Issue: Tigranes V of Armenia; Alexander prince of Judea
Names
- Gaius Julius Alexander? (cf. Alexander II)
- Dynasty: Herodian dynasty
- Father: Herod the Great
- Mother: Mariamne I

Alexander (was born around 35 BC and died around 7 BC) was a King's Son of Judea and part of the Hasmonean branch of the Herodian dynasty. His was the first-born son of Herod the Great and born to the Hasmonean princess, Mariamne.

The unfortunate fate which persistently pursued the Hasmonean house also overtook this prince. As heir presumptive to the throne by right of descent on his mother's side, he was sent to Rome for his education in the year 23 BC. He remained there in the household of Asinius Pollio until about the year 17 BC, when Herod himself brought him and his younger brother Aristobulus, who had been with him, home to Jerusalem. Shortly afterward, Alexander received in marriage the Cappadocian Princess, Glaphyra, the daughter of King Archelaus of Cappadocia. Glaphyra bore Alexander three children: two sons, Tigranes and Alexander, and an unnamed daughter.

== Demise ==
Alexander was regarded as handsome and sincere, qualities which endeared him to the public, who supported the house of the Maccabees for the throne instead of the half-Jewish Herod. However, he became marked by a certain degree of vanity and a spirit of vindictiveness, which rendered him extremely unpopular with the partisans of Herod who began to fear retribution should he become King. One concern about this account is Josephus' potential bias towards his Roman audience; his criticism may not be genuine and merely an attempt to discredit Judea after a major rebellion.

Salome repeatedly warned Herod of danger from Alexander and his brother Aristobulus. The king felt that it was not impossible that his sons meditated revenge for Mariamne's execution, considering the open antipathy his sons expressed against their father combined to open the king's ear to the calumnies of Salome and her fellow plotters. Herod's attempt to humiliate Alexander by restoring to honor Antipater, an older son of another wife, resulted in disaster. Antipater's insidious plotting and the open enmity to Herod shown by Alexander widened the breach between father and son to such an extent that in the year 12 BC, Herod felt himself constrained to bring charges against his sons before Augustus. A reconciliation was brought about, but it was of short duration. Shortly afterward (about 10 BC), Alexander was thrown into prison on the evidence of a tortured witness who accused him of planning the murder of Herod. Intercepted letters were produced which revealed Alexander's bitterness against his father. In vain did Archelaus, Alexander's father-in-law, endeavor to bring about better relations between them. The reconciliation was again a brief one, so that the intrigues of Antipater and Salome succeeded once more in securing the incarceration of Alexander and Aristobulus (about 8 BC). This was a dynastic conflict, in the key territory bridging West and East and the context was instability erupting across the Roman Empire.

== Conviction ==
Herod lodged a formal complaint of high treason against them with Augustus, who put the matter into Herod's own hands so that he would take charge of this case and have the last word. The attempts of Alexander's friends, by means of petition to King Herod, to avert the execution of the sentence, resulted in the death of Tero — an old and devoted servant of Herod who openly remonstrated with the king for the enormity of the proposed judicial crime — and of 300 others who were denounced as partisans of Alexander. The sentence was carried out without delay; about the year 7 BC, at Sebaste (Samaria) — where thirty years before Mariamne's wedding had been celebrated — her sons suffered death by the cord.

== Family tree of the Herodian dynasty ==
There are three princes by the name Phasael in the Herodian dynasty, all three mentioned by Josephus in "War" (BJ) and "Antiquities" (AJ):

- Phasael I, son of Antipater and Cypros (BJ 1.181; AJ 14.121)
- Phasael II, son of Phasael I (BJ 1.266; AJ 17.196)
- Phasael III, son of Herod the Great (BJ 1.181; AJ 14.121) and father of Cypros/Kypros, wife of Agrippa I

Antipater the Idumaean procurator of Judea
1.Doris; 2.Mariamne I 3.Mariamne II; 4.Malthace	Herod I the Great king of Judea	5.Cleopatra of Jerusalem; 6.Pallas; 7.Phaidra; 8.Elpis	Phasael governor of Jerusalem
(1) Antipater co-regent of Judaea	(2) Alexander I	(2) Aristobulus IV	(3) Herod II (Herod Philip)	(4) Herod Archelaus ethnarch of Judea, Idumea	(4) Herod Antipas tetrarch of Galilea & Perea	(5) Philip the Tetrarch of Iturea & Trachonitis
Tigranes V of Armenia	Alexander II	Herod Agrippa I king of Judea	Herod V ruler of Chalcis	Aristobulus Minor
Tigranes VI of Armenia	Herod Agrippa II king of Judea	Aristobulus ruler of Chalcis
Gaius Julius Alexander ruler of Cilicia
Gaius Julius Agrippa quaestor of Asia	Gaius Julius Alexander Berenicianus proconsul of Asia
Lucius Julius Gainius Fabius Agrippa gymnasiarch
