= Herod Philip =

Herod Philip is used by some modern writers to refer to two sons of Herod the Great:

- Herod II (or Herod Philip I; c. 27 BCE–33/34 CE), son of Herod the Great and his third wife (Mariamne II), husband of Herodias
- Philip the Tetrarch (or Herod Philip II; c. 26 BCE–34 CE), son of Herod and his fifth wife (Cleopatra of Jerusalem), husband of Salome
