= Julia of Cilicia =

Cilician Princess, daughter of King Gaius Julius Alexander of Cetis

Julia Iotapa or Julia Iotape, sometimes known as Julia of Cilicia (Greek: Ίουλία Ιοτάπα; born c. 80), was a Cilician princess who lived in the 1st century and 2nd century. Daughter of King Gaius Julius Alexander of Cetis, she married Gaius Julius Quadratus Bassus, Galatian Roman Senator from Anatolia.

== Biography ==
Julia Iotapa was the daughter to King Gaius Julius Alexander and Queen Julia Iotapa of Cetis. Her eldest brothers were Gaius Julius Agrippa and Gaius Julius Alexander Berenicianus. She was born, raised and educated in Cetis.

The Kingdom of Cetis was a small client state in the Roman Empire. Cetis was a small region in Cilicia that was previously ruled by her Cappadocian royal ancestors and Antiochus IV. The city in Cilicia Elaiussa Sebaste was a part of the Kingdom. When her parents married in Rome in 58, the Roman Emperor Nero crowned his parents as monarchs and gave them that region to rule.

Surviving inscriptions on her family reveal that her family was related to important members of Asian, non-Jewish and Jewish aristocracy. She was of Jewish, Nabataean, Edomite, Greek, Armenian, Median and Persian origins. Her paternal grandparents were King Tigranes VI of Armenia and his wife Opgalli. Through Tigranes, she was a descendant of King Archelaus of Cappadocia, King of Judea Herod the Great and his wife Mariamne. Iotapa along with her family and paternal relatives, were among the last known descendants of the Herodian Dynasty. She was an apostate to Judaism. It is unlikely that Iotapa attempted to exert influence on Judean politics. Her maternal grandparents were King Antiochus IV of Commagene and Queen Julia Iotapa.

Iotapa married the Galatian Roman Senator from Anatolia, Gaius Julius Quadratus Bassus. Iotapa bore Bassus a daughter called Julia Quadratilla (b. ca. 100).

A possible descendant of Iotapa and Bassus could be the usurper Jotapian, who lived in the 3rd century.

== Biography of Iotapa's daughter ==
Iotapa's daughter, Julia Quadratilla (b. ca. 100), married Gaius Julius Lupus Titus Vibius Varus Laevillus (ca. 95 – after 132), Quaestor in Asia in 132.

Quadratilla and Laevillus had:

- Aulus Julius Amyntas, Nobleman of Ephesus
- Aulus Julius Claudius Charax (ca. 115 – after 147), married and father of:
  - Julia, married to Gaius Asinius Rufus (ca. 110 – after 136), and had issue
- Aulus Julius Proculus (ca. 120 – after 156), Nobleman of Ephesus, married to Claudia Basilo (b. ca. 125)

== See also ==
- Iotapa (disambiguation)

== Sources ==
- acsearch.info ancient coin search engine: Kings of Armenia
- Anthony Wagner, Pedigree and Progress, Essays in the Genealogical Interpretation of History, London, Philmore, 1975. Rutgers Alex CS4.W33.
- Schwartz, Seth (1990). Josephus and Judaean politics. Columbia studies in the classical tradition. Leiden, New York: Brill. p. 137. ISBN 90-04-09230-7. OCLC 21595783.
- Anthony Bash, Ambassadors for Christ: an exploration of ambassadorial language in the New Testament, Mohr Siebeck, 1997
- Grainger, John D. (2003). Nerva and the Roman succession Crisis AD 96-99. London, New York: Routledge. pp. xvi. ISBN 0-415-28917-3. OCLC 52012210.
- Chris Bennett, Egyptian Royal Genealogy – Ptolemaic Dynasty, 2005. Available here.
