= Tigranes VI of Armenia =

King of Armenia from 58 to 61

- King of Armenia
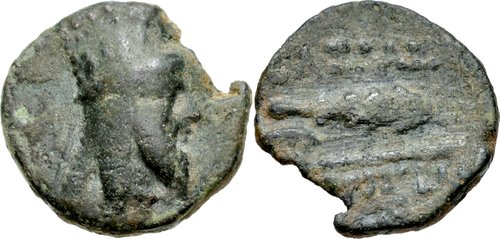

King of Armenia
- Reign: 58 – 61
- Coronation: 58, Rome, Roman Empire
- Successor: Tiridates I
- Born: Gaius Julius Tigranes before 25
- Died: after 68
- wife: Opgalli
- Issue: Gaius Julius Alexander; Julia
- House: Herodian dynasty
- Father: Alexander

Tigranes VI, also known as Tigran VI or by his Roman name Gaius Julius Tigranes (Greek: Γαίος Ιούλιος Τιγράνης, before 25 – after 68) was a Herodian prince and served as a Roman client king of Armenia in the 1st century.

He was the child born to Alexander by an unnamed wife. His mother was a noblewoman that flourished in the reigns of the first two Roman emperors Augustus and Tiberius. He was the namesake of his paternal uncle Tigranes V, who served as a previous king of Armenia during the reign of Augustus. His father's parents were Alexander and Glaphyra. Tigranes appears to be the only grandchild born to his paternal grandparents.

His paternal grandfather Alexander was a Judean prince of Jewish, Nabataean and Edomite descent and was a son of King of Judea, Herod the Great and his wife Mariamne. His paternal grandmother Glaphyra was a Cappadocian princess of Greek, Armenian and Persian descent. She was the daughter of King Archelaus of Cappadocia and her mother was an unnamed princess from Armenia, possibly a relation of the Artaxiad dynasty.

Tigranes’ name is a reflection of his Armenian and Hellenic lineage. The name Tigranes was the most common royal name in the Artaxiad dynasty and was among the most ancient names of the Armenian kings. Josephus states that his ancestral line had been kings of Armenia. Like his father and paternal uncle, Tigranes was an apostate to Judaism. It is unlikely that Tigranes attempted to exert influence on Judean politics.

Little is known on Tigranes’ life prior to becoming King of Armenia. Tigranes was raised in Rome. Tigranes married a noblewoman from central Anatolia called Opgalli. Opgalli was a Phrygian woman {{Citation needed|reason=this conclusion cannot be stated as proven. More evidence is required.|date=November 2025}} who may have been a Hellenic Jew. His wife is only known through surviving numismatic evidence from his kingship. Her royal title is in Greek ΒΑΣ ΟΠΓΑΛΛΥ which means of Queen Opgalli. ΒΑΣ is the royal abbreviation or shortening for the Greek word ΒΑΣΙΛΕΙΑ which means Queen. Opgalli bore Tigranes at least two known children: a son Gaius Julius Alexander and a daughter Julia. Tigranes and his children were the last royal descendants of the kings of Cappadocia.

In the spring of 58 the Roman general Gnaeus Domitius Corbulo with his army, entered Armenia from Cappadocia and advanced towards Artaxata, while Pharasmanes I of Iberia attacked from the north and Antiochus IV of Commagene attacked from the southwest. Tiridates I ran away from his capital which Corbulo set fire to. In the summer of that year, Corbulo advanced towards Tigranakert and arrived in the city that opened the gates, only one citadel resisted. The majority of the Armenians had abandoned resistance and accepted a prince given by Rome.

In 58, the Roman emperor Nero crowned Tigranes as King of Armenia in Rome. Nero had given to Tigranes a guard of 1000 legionary soldiers, three auxiliary cohorts and two wings of horses were allotted to him in order to defend and protect Armenia. At the same time, his son Alexander married Julia Iotapa a Commagenean princess and the daughter of King Antiochus IV of Commagene in Rome. Nero crowned Alexander and Iotapa as Roman client monarchs of Cetis, a small region in Cilicia, which was previously ruled by Antiochus IV.

Tigranes invaded a neighbouring small vassal state of the Parthians called Adiabene and deposed their King Monobazes. Vologases I of Parthia considered this as an act of aggression from Rome. He attacked Armenia and besieged Tigranakert. Eventually, the Parthians signed a treaty with Corbulo to install Tiridates I as King of Armenia as long as he went to Rome to be crowned by Nero. In 63 Tigranes had to renounce his crown.

Historical and numismatic evidence shows that Nero planned to restore Tigranes to the Armenian throne, however Nero's plan for Tigranes and Armenia disintegrated with the outbreak of the First Jewish–Roman War in 66. His fate afterwards is not known. Coinage has survived from his reign. His royal title is in Greek ΒΑΣΙΛΕΩΣ ΤΙΓΡΑΝΟΥ ΜΕΓΑΛΟΥ which means of great King Tigranes. The surviving coinage is a reflection of his Hellenic and Armenian descent and is evidence that he relinquished his Jewish connections.

== Family tree of the Herodian dynasty ==
There are three princes by the name Phasael in the Herodian dynasty, all three mentioned by Josephus in "War" (BJ) and "Antiquities" (AJ):

- Phasael I, son of Antipater and Cypros (BJ 1.181; AJ 14.121)
- Phasael II, son of Phasael I (BJ 1.266; AJ 17.196)
- Phasael III, son of Herod the Great (BJ 1.181; AJ 14.121) and father of Cypros/Kypros, wife of Agrippa I

Antipater the Idumaean procurator of Judea
1.Doris; 2.Mariamne I 3.Mariamne II; 4.Malthace	Herod I the Great king of Judea	5.Cleopatra of Jerusalem; 6.Pallas; 7.Phaidra; 8.Elpis	Phasael governor of Jerusalem
(1) Antipater co-regent of Judaea	(2) Alexander I	(2) Aristobulus IV	(3) Herod II (Herod Philip)	(4) Herod Archelaus ethnarch of Judea, Idumea	(4) Herod Antipas tetrarch of Galilea & Perea	(5) Philip the Tetrarch of Iturea & Trachonitis
Tigranes V of Armenia	Alexander II	Herod Agrippa I king of Judea	Herod V ruler of Chalcis	Aristobulus Minor
Tigranes VI of Armenia	Herod Agrippa II king of Judea	Aristobulus ruler of Chalcis
Gaius Julius Alexander ruler of Cilicia
Gaius Julius Agrippa quaestor of Asia	Gaius Julius Alexander Berenicianus proconsul of Asia
Lucius Julius Gainius Fabius Agrippa gymnasiarch

== Sources ==
- ARMENIA (HAYK') by I. Mladjov
- acsearch.info – the ancient coin search engine: article on Tigranes VI
- H. Temporini & W. Haase, Aufstieg und Niedergang der römischen Welt: Geschichte und Kultur Roms im spiegel der neueren Forschung, Walter de Gruyter, 1977
- S. Schwartz, Josephus and Judaean politics, BRILL, 1990
- R. Syme & A.R. Birley, Anatolica: studies in Strabo, Oxford University Press, 1995
- A.E. Redgate, The Armenians, Wiley-Blackwell, 2000
- J.D. Grainger, Nerva and the Roman succession crisis of AD 96–99, Routledge, 2003
- R.G. Hovannisian, The Armenian People from Ancient to Modern Times, Volume 1: The Dynastic Periods: From Antiquity to the Fourteenth Century, Palgrave Macmillan, 2004
- J. Lindsay, A View of the History and Coinage of the Parthians, Adamant Media Corporation, p.p. 83-84. ISBN 1-4021-6080-1
- D. Dueck, H. Lindsay & S. Pothecary, Strabo's cultural geography: the making of a kolossourgia, Cambridge University Press, 2005
- A. Kasher & E. Witztum, King Herod: a persecuted persecutor: a case study in psychohistory and psychobiography, Walter de Gruyter, 2007
