= Herod Archelaus =

Ethnarch of ancient Samaria, Judea, and Idumea

- Herod Archelaus from Guillaume Rouillé's Promptuarii Iconum Insigniorum

Ethnarch of Judea, Samaria, and Idumea
- Reign: 4 BC – 6 AD
- Born: 23 BC
- Died: c. 18 AD; Vienne, Roman Gaul
- Dynasty: Herodian
- Father: Herod I
- Mother: Malthace

Herod Archelaus (Ancient Greek: Ἡρῴδης Ἀρχέλαος, Hērōidēs Archelaos; 23 BC – c. AD 18) was the ethnarch of Samaria, Judea, and Idumea, including the cities Caesarea and Jaffa, for nine years (c. 4 BC to AD 6). As a ruler, he was part of what's known as the Herodian tetrarchy, created after the death of Herod the Great. Herod Archelaus was the son of Herod the Great and Malthace the Samaritan, brother of Herod Antipas, and half-brother of Herod II. Archelaus (a name meaning "leading the people") came to power after the death of his father Herod the Great in 4 BC, and ruled over one-half of the territorial dominion of his father. Archelaus was removed by the Roman emperor Augustus when Judaea province was formed under direct Roman rule, at the time of the Census of Quirinius.

== Biography ==
Domain of Herod Archelaus as was given to him by Augustus after the death of King Herod the Great.

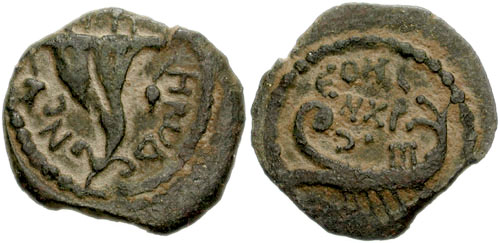
Coin of Herod Archelaus

Josephus writes that Herod the Great (father of Archelaus) was in Jericho at the time of his death. Just prior to his final trip to Jericho, he was deeply involved in a religious conflagration. Herod had placed a golden eagle over the Temple entrance, a symbol which was perceived as blasphemous. The eagle was chopped down with axes. Two teachers and approximately 40 other youths were arrested for this act and immolated. Herod defended his works and went on to attack his predecessors, the Hasmoneans; he also killed all male lineal successors of the Hasmoneans. The Pharisees had long insulted the Hasmoneans as well with claims of parentage from Greeks. This racial slur was repeated by the Pharisees through the rule of Alexander Jannaeus and Queen Salome.

With this explicit background given, Josephus began an exposition of the days of Archelaus' reign before Passover of 4 BC. Archelaus dressed in white and ascended a golden throne. He appeared to be kind to the populace in Jerusalem, in order to appease their desires for lower taxes and an end to the (political) imprisonment of Herod's enemies. The demeanor of the questioning appeared to turn at some point, and the crowd began to call for the punishment of those of Herod's people who ordered the death of the two teachers and the 40 youths. They also demanded the replacement of the High Priest, from the appointed High Priest of Herod's to a High Priest, "of greater piety and purity". Archelaus acceded to this request and asked the crowd for moderation until he was confirmed king by Augustus.

While people were mourning the death of the teachers, Archelaus began to worry as a crowd started streaming into the temple area, and the masses were escalating in their threatening behavior. Henry St. John Thackeray's translation of Josephus here states it thus: "The promoters of the mourning for the doctors stood in the body of the temple, procuring recruits for their faction". So Archelaus sent a general and a "tribune in command of a cohort" to reason with these "Seditionists" and wait until Archelaus could return from Rome. Those who came from Archelaus were stoned, with many killed. After midnight Archelaus ordered the entire army into the city to the temple where the insurrectionists had gone to perform sacrifices; Josephus records the death toll at 3000. Archelaus sent heralds around the city announcing the cancellation of Passover.

Archelaus was proclaimed king by the army, but declined to assume the title until he had submitted his claims to Caesar Augustus; thus he sailed to Rome to face accusations from his younger brother Antipas over how the recent uproar was handled and regarding the succession clash between the two. Nicolaus of Damascus argued in favour of Archelaus, suggesting the change to Herod's will (supposedly written a few weeks prior and yielding the kingship to Archelaus instead of Antipas) as valid. The change of the will is attested from Jericho by one "Ptolemy", keeper of Herod's Seal and brother to Nicholaus.

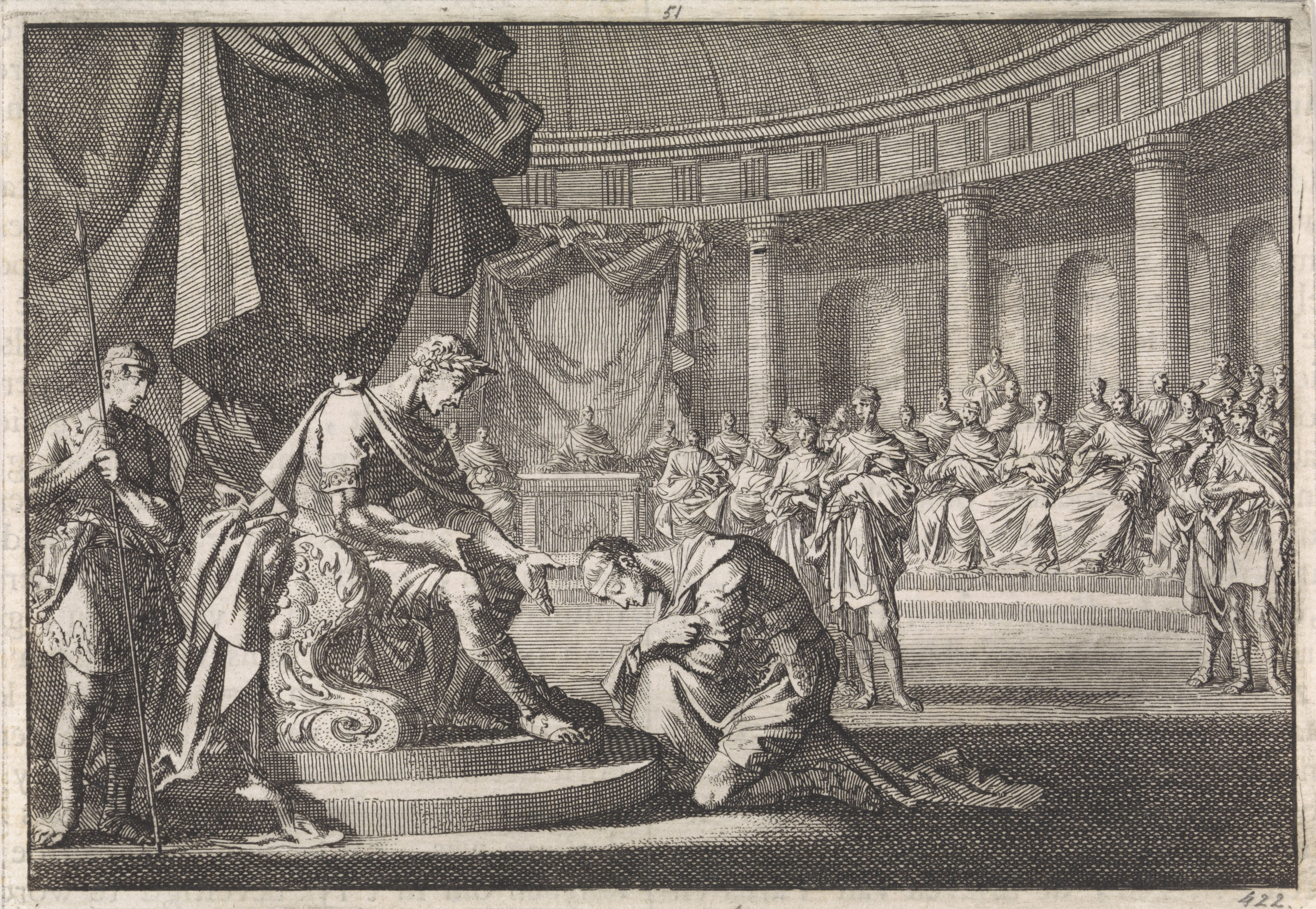
"Archelaus kneels before Augustus" (Jan Luyken, 1704)

Archelaus, at the conclusion of the arguments, fell at Caesar's feet. Caesar raised him up and stated that Archelaus "was worthy to succeed his father". Caesar opted to divide the kingdom, and entrust the most important regions of Judea to Archelaus by granting him the tetrarchy of Judea, and bestowing the title of ethnarch upon him.

The first wife of Archelaus is given by Josephus simply as Mariamne, perhaps Mariamne III, daughter of Aristobulus IV, whom he divorced to marry Glaphyra. She was the widow of Archelaus' brother Alexander, though her second husband, Juba, king of Mauretania, was alive. His subjects complained to Augustus over this violation of the Mosaic law. Archelaus fell into disrepute and was deposed in his 10th year of reign as ethnarch, being banished to Vienna (today Vienne) in Gaul. Samaria, Judea proper, and Idumea became the Roman province of Judaea.

== Biblical references ==
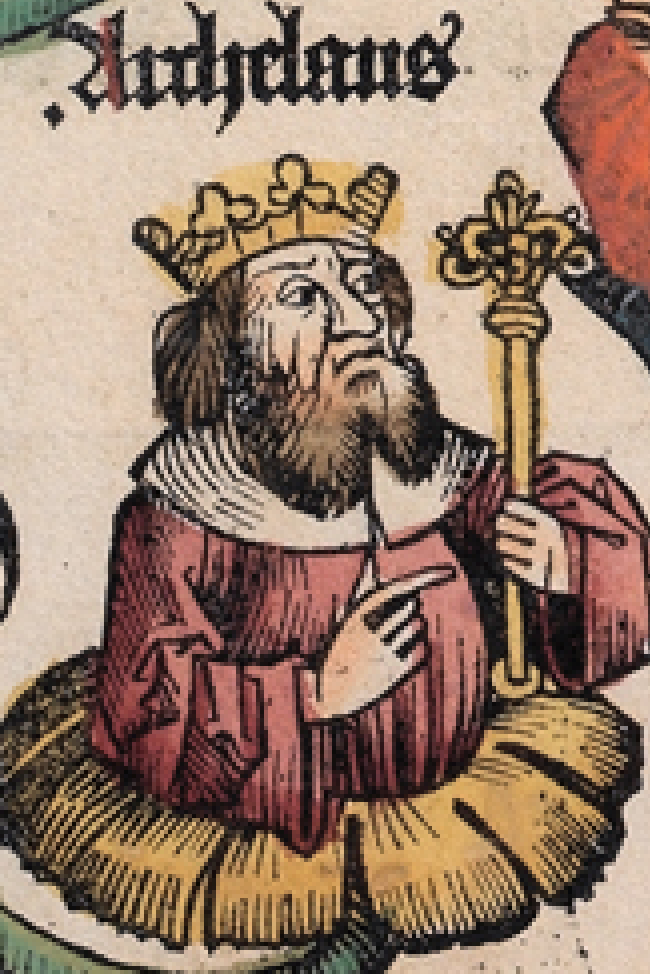
Herod Archelaus, in the 1493 Nuremberg Chronicle

Schematic family tree showing the Herods of the Bible.

Archelaus is mentioned in the Gospel of Matthew (chapter 2 verse 13–23). An angel of the Lord appeared to Joseph in a dream and told him to get up and take Mary and Jesus and flee to Egypt to avoid the Massacre of the Innocents. When Herod the Great died, Joseph was told by an angel in a dream to return to the land of Israel (presumably to Bethlehem). However, upon hearing that Archelaus had succeeded his father as ruler of Judaea he "was afraid to go there" (Matthew 2:22), and was again warned in a dream by God "and turned aside to the region of" Galilee. This is Matthew's explanation of why Jesus was born in Bethlehem in Judea but grew up in Nazareth.

The beginning and conclusion of Jesus' parable of the minas in the Gospel of Luke, chapter 19, may refer to Archelaus' journey to Rome. Some interpreters conclude from this that Jesus' parables and preaching made use of events familiar to the people as examples for bringing his spiritual lessons to life. Others read the allusion as arising from later adaptations of Jesus' parables in the oral tradition, before the parables were recorded in the gospels.

A nobleman went into a far country to receive for himself a kingdom and then return ... But his citizens hated him and sent a delegation after him, saying, "We do not want this man to reign over us." ... "But as for these enemies of mine," [said the nobleman,] "who did not want me to reign over them, bring them here and slaughter them before me." (Luke 19:12, 19:14, 19:27)

According to the Ethiopic Christian apocryphal text "Epistle of the Apostles", Archelaus was ruling Cilicia under the Romans during the crucifixion of Jesus Christ. This is not backed by any other primary sources, only the Ethiopic and Coptic versions of the Epistle of the Apostles.

== Family tree of the Herodian dynasty ==
There are three princes by the name Phasael in the Herodian dynasty, all three mentioned by Josephus in "War" (BJ) and "Antiquities" (AJ):

- Phasael I, son of Antipater and Cypros (BJ 1.181; AJ 14.121)
- Phasael II, son of Phasael I (BJ 1.266; AJ 17.196)
- Phasael III, son of Herod the Great (BJ 1.181; AJ 14.121) and father of Cypros/Kypros, wife of Agrippa I

Antipater the Idumaean procurator of Judea
1.Doris; 2.Mariamne I 3.Mariamne II; 4.Malthace	Herod I the Great king of Judea	5.Cleopatra of Jerusalem; 6.Pallas; 7.Phaidra; 8.Elpis	Phasael governor of Jerusalem
(1) Antipater co-regent of Judaea	(2) Alexander I	(2) Aristobulus IV	(3) Herod II (Herod Philip)	(4) Herod Archelaus ethnarch of Judea, Idumea	(4) Herod Antipas tetrarch of Galilea & Perea	(5) Philip the Tetrarch of Iturea & Trachonitis
Tigranes V of Armenia	Alexander II	Herod Agrippa I king of Judea	Herod V ruler of Chalcis	Aristobulus Minor
Tigranes VI of Armenia	Herod Agrippa II king of Judea	Aristobulus ruler of Chalcis
Gaius Julius Alexander ruler of Cilicia
Gaius Julius Agrippa quaestor of Asia	Gaius Julius Alexander Berenicianus proconsul of Asia
Lucius Julius Gainius Fabius Agrippa gymnasiarch

== See also ==
- Herodian dynasty
- Herodian kingdom
- List of biblical figures identified in extra-biblical sources

Herod Archelaus House of Herod Born: 23 BC Died: 18 AD
Preceded by King Herod the Great	Ethnarch of Judaea; 4 BC–6 AD	Vacant governed by Roman prefect Title next held by King Agrippa I
