= Philip the Tetrarch =

Son of Herod the Great and ruler of part of his father's kingdom

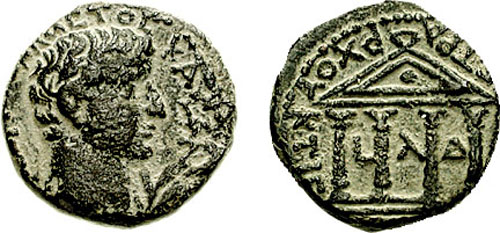
Tiberius featured on a coin struck by Philip the Tetrarch

Philip received the tetrarchy of Iturea, Trachonitis, Gaulanitis, Batanea, and Auranitis following the death of his father.

Philip the Tetrarch (c. 26 BCE – 34 CE), was the son of Herod the Great and his fifth wife, Cleopatra of Jerusalem. As a tetrarch, i.e. ruler over one of the four unequal parts into which his father's kingdom was divided, namely the northeastern one, he maintained his rule from Herod's death in 4 BCE until his own in 34 CE. This arrangement is known as the Herodian tetrarchy, all four heirs remaining client rulers of Rome, like Herod himself. The other three were his half-brothers Herod Antipas and Herod Archelaus, and his aunt Salome I. He is not the same person as Herod the Younger, whom some writers call Herod Philip I. To distinguish the two, he is called Herod Philip II by some writers (see "Naming convention").

== Territory ==
Philip ruled territories which the Gospel of Luke lists as Iturea and Trachonitis and Flavius Josephus lists as Gaulanitis, Trachonitis and Paneas as well as Batanea, Trachonitis, Auranitis, and "a certain part of what is called the House of Zenodorus".

As the capital of his tetrarchy, Philip rebuilt the city of Caesarea Philippi, calling it by his own name to distinguish it from the Caesarea on the sea-coast.

== Marriage and dynasty ==
Philip married Salome, also a member of the Herodian dynasty. This Salome is usually identified as the daughter of Philip's niece Herodias and his brother Herod the Younger. This Salome appears in the Bible in connection with the beheading of John the Baptist.

However, there would have great difference in their ages: Salome was born ca. 14 CE, at which time Herod Philip was 39 years old. Hence, some scholars supposed that Philip was married to another Salome, his own half-sister by that same name, a daughter of Herod the Great and his 8th wife Elpis. This Salome was born c. 14 BCE, and so only twelve years younger than Herod Philip (a more realistic age gap). But this would also be the only known occurrence of the children of Herod the Great intermarrying, even if from different mothers. Marriages to first cousins and uncles, however, were relatively common in the Herodian dynasty.

Kokkinos, on the other hand, argues that Philip never married any Salome but rather Herodias (who had earlier divorced her first husband, Herod the Younger, and supposedly only later went on to marry Herod Antipas) and that the traditional reading of these marriages were due to a mistake by Josephus.^{[p. 266-267]}

== Naming convention ==
There is no contemporary evidence for Philip the Tetrarch's use of the name "Herod Philip" (Greek: Ἡρώδης Φίλιππος, Hērōdēs Philippos) as a dynastic title, as did occur with his brothers Herod Antipas and Herod Archelaus.^{[p. 222-223]; [266]} Neither Josephus nor the gospels (Matthew 14:3, Mark 6:17, Luke 3:1) preface Philip's name by the dynastic name "Herod".

This conventional naming ultimately derives from references to the first husband of Herodias (whom she later divorced to marry his brother, Herod Antipas). While Josephus calls him "Herod", the gospels of Matthew and Mark call him "Philip". Some authors combined the names "Herod" and "Philip" to form the conventional name "Herod Philip (I)". While this was intended to distinguish him from Philip the Tetrarch, the latter subsequently was also called "Herod Philip (II)", with numerals again distinguishing the two. Kokkinos calls the convention a "stubborn insistence" and "without any value".^{[p. 222-223]; [266]}

== Years of reign ==
There are various problems in determining the beginning and ending years of the reign of Philip. The first problem is whether he reigned 32, 36, or 37 years, all of which variants appear in different copies of the relevant passage in Josephus (Antiquities 18.106/18.4.6). This issue has now been settled by the coins that Philip issued during his reign. The dated coins are from his years 5, 12, 16, 19, 30, 34, and 37, thus determining that 37 was the original figure in Josephus.

The second problem is matching Philip's 37th and last year with the reign of Tiberius, so that an absolute date (AD/CE) can be assigned. Here again there are variants in the passage just cited in Josephus (Ant. 18.106): Some texts of Josephus say Philip's death was in the twentieth year of Tiberius, as appears in modern versions, or in Tiberius’s twenty-second year, "as given in the many Latin manuscripts issued before AD 1455. Adding to the ambiguity is whether Josephus was using 'factual' years for the reign of Tiberius (dating his years from the exact date he was declared emperor by the Senate) or by calendar years starting on January 1". Steinmann and Young conclude (p. 451) that Josephus used the factual method for Roman emperors, as is suggested by his giving their reign lengths in the exact terms of years, months, and days rather than just years as he does for Judean rulers.

Philip issued a coin that gives to which he assigns year 19 of reign. This coin honors Tiberius as the new emperor after Tiberius took the throne of Rome on the death of Augustus in August of 14 CE. Philip’s coin commemorating Tiberius's emperorship could only have been issued after the news of the death of Augustus reached Judea, which would have been after the start of the Judean regnal year that began in Tishri of 14 CE. Since this places Philip's coin of year 19 as the year beginning in Tishri of 14 CE, his year 37, in which he died, would have eighteen years later, in the Judean regnal year that began in Tishri of 32 CE. This rules out the variants of Josephus that have Philip dying in the 22nd year of Tiberius, which would have begun by factual reckoning in August of 35 (21 years later than August 14 CE), but it is consistent with the twentieth factual year, which began in August of 33. The overlap of these two counting systems, the Judean with Tishri-based years and the Roman with years from the start of emperorship, thereby narrows the death of Philip to the period from September 18 to October 14 of 33 CE.

In order to ensure accuracy, the foregoing discussion used, for Judean rulers such as Philip, the Judean method of starting the regnal year in the lunar month of Tishri. The first day of Tishri occurs in either September or October of the Roman-based calendar that we use to this day. That Judeans in the first century BCE and the first century CE used a Tishri-based calendar for governmental affairs, which would include the reigns of Judean kings and tetrarchs, is made explicit by Josephus in Antiquities 1.81/1.3.3:

After relating that Moses instituted Nisan as the first month for festivals and "everything related to divine worship“, he [Josephus] continues: ... "concerning, however, buying (praseis) and selling (onas) and the other financial administration [or tax administration] (dioikasin) he [Moses] preserved the earlier arrangement". The lexicons give the meaning of dioikasin as "administration, management“, or "control, government, administration, treasury department". There is no meaning of "ordinary affairs" as rendered by Whiston and later Thackeray. By using the word dioikasis, Josephus clearly meant that the affairs of government (administration) were according to a Tishri-based calendar, and it is unfortunate that Thackeray apparently followed Whiston in rendering this Greek word in English. Josephus was stating that all activities other than those related to divinely mandated religious observances would be reckoned by a fall calendar that started with the first day of Tishri.

The coins show that Philip reigned 37 years, and his final year began in Tishri of 32 CE. This shows he considered the start of his reign to have taken place in the year that began in Tishri of 6 BCE.

== Family tree of the Herodian dynasty ==
There are three princes by the name Phasael in the Herodian dynasty, all three mentioned by Josephus in "War" (BJ) and "Antiquities" (AJ):

- Phasael I, son of Antipater and Cypros (BJ 1.181; AJ 14.121)
- Phasael II, son of Phasael I (BJ 1.266; AJ 17.196)
- Phasael III, son of Herod the Great (BJ 1.181; AJ 14.121) and father of Cypros/Kypros, wife of Agrippa I

Antipater the Idumaean procurator of Judea
1.Doris; 2.Mariamne I 3.Mariamne II; 4.Malthace	Herod I the Great king of Judea	5.Cleopatra of Jerusalem; 6.Pallas; 7.Phaidra; 8.Elpis	Phasael governor of Jerusalem
(1) Antipater co-regent of Judaea	(2) Alexander I	(2) Aristobulus IV	(3) Herod II (Herod Philip)	(4) Herod Archelaus ethnarch of Judea, Idumea	(4) Herod Antipas tetrarch of Galilea & Perea	(5) Philip the Tetrarch of Iturea & Trachonitis
Tigranes V of Armenia	Alexander II	Herod Agrippa I king of Judea	Herod V ruler of Chalcis	Aristobulus Minor
Tigranes VI of Armenia	Herod Agrippa II king of Judea	Aristobulus ruler of Chalcis
Gaius Julius Alexander ruler of Cilicia
Gaius Julius Agrippa quaestor of Asia	Gaius Julius Alexander Berenicianus proconsul of Asia
Lucius Julius Gainius Fabius Agrippa gymnasiarch

== See also ==
- Herodian dynasty
- Herodian kingdom
- List of biblical figures identified in extra-biblical sources

== Bibliography ==
- Vol. 10: The Augustan empire, 44 B.C.–A.D. 70. Cambridge: Cambridge University Press.
  - J. B. Bury; S.A. Cook; F.E. Adcock; M.P. Charlesworth; N.H. Baynes, eds. (1965) [latest reprint]. ~.
  - Bowman, Alan K.; Champlin, Edward; Lintott, Andrew, eds. (2001) [1996]. ~. Cambridge University Press. ISBN 0521264308.
- Kokkinos, Nikos (1998). "The Herodian Dynasty: Origins, Role in Society and Eclipse". Journal for the Study of the Pseudepigrapha, Supplement Series. Sheffield: Sheffield Academic Press: 236–240.

Philip the Tetrarch House of Herod Died: 34 AD
Preceded by King Herod I	Tetrarch of Batanea; 4 BC – 34 AD	Vacant Title next held by King Agrippa I
