= Julia Iotapa (daughter of Antiochus IV) =

Daughter of Antiochus IV of Commagene, Queen of Cetis, in Cilicia

Julia Iotapa or Julia Iotape (born c. 45), daughter of King Antiochus IV of Commagene, was a Queen of Cetis, consort of Gaius Julius Alexander, son of Herodian prince Gaius Julius Tigranes.

== Biography ==
Julia Iotapa was the daughter and youngest child of King Antiochus IV of Commagene and Queen Iotapa of Commagene, client monarchs who lived under the Roman Empire. Her parents were full-blooded siblings. Iotapa's eldest brothers were princes Gaius Julius Archelaus Antiochus Epiphanes and Callinicus.

Iotapa's father Antiochus IV was an ally to the Roman Emperor Nero and various members of the Herodian Dynasty. Between 58 and 59, there was civil unrest and warfare that occurred in the Kingdom of Armenia. The majority of Armenians had abandoned resistance and wanted peace, which included accepting a prince to be crowned by Nero as the king of Armenia. Antiochus IV had participated in protecting Armenia with the Romans from Tiridates I of Armenia.

Tigranes from his marriage had a son called Gaius Julius Alexander. After Tigranes was crowned King in Rome, his son Alexander had married Iotapa in Rome. The marriage between Alexander and Iotapa was mostly a political alliance that occurred between the fathers of Iotapa and Alexander. After the marriage of Iotapa and Alexander occurred in Rome, Nero crowned them Queen and King of Cetis, a small region in Cilicia, that was previously ruled by her father. The Roman city in Cilicia, Elaiussa Sebaste, was made a part of their Kingdom. Iotapa and Alexander ruled Cetis from 58 until at least 72. Iotapa was still alive when the Flavian dynasty ruled the Roman Empire from 69 to 96. However, after that, there is no more known on Iotapa.

Little is known on the marriage and reign of Alexander and Iotapa. Iotapa and Alexander had three children: two sons Gaius Julius Agrippa, Gaius Julius Alexander Berenicianus and a daughter, Julia Iotapa.

== Sources ==
- Roman-emperors.org
- Herodes
- Josephus
- http://www2.ehw.gr/asiaminor/Forms/fLemmaBody.aspx?lemmaid=?7950
- Anthony Wagner, Pedigree and Progress, Essays in the Genealogical Interpretation of History, London, Philmore, 1975. Rutgers Alex CS4.W33.
- Schwartz, Seth (1990). Josephus and Judaean politics. Columbia studies in the classical tradition. Leiden, New York: Brill. p. 137. ISBN 90-04-09230-7. OCLC 21595783.
- Chahin, Mark (2001). The Kingdom of Armenia. Routledge, pp. 190–191. ISBN 0-7007-1452-9
- Grainger, John D. (2003). Nerva and the Roman succession Crisis AD 96-99. London, New York: Routledge. pp. xvi. ISBN 0-415-28917-3. OCLC 52012210.
- Chris Bennett Egyptian Royal Genealogy – Ptolemaic Dynasty. 2005. Archived from the original on 27 October 2009.
