= Herod II =

Son of Herod the Great of Judea and Mariamne II (c. 27 BC - 33/34 AD)

- Prince of Judea
- Predecessor: Herod I
- Successor: Herod III
- Born: c. 27 BC
- Died: 33/34 AD
- Spouse: Herodias
- Issue: Salome
- Dynasty: Herodian dynasty
- Father: Herod the Great
- Mother: Mariamne (third wife of Herod)

Herod II (c. 27 BC – 33/34 AD) was the son of Herod the Great and Mariamne II, the daughter of Simon Boethus the High Priest, and the first husband of Herodias, daughter of Aristobulus IV and his wife Berenice. For a brief period he was his father's heir apparent, but Herod I removed him from succession in his will. Some writers call him Herod Philip I (not to be confused with Philip the Tetrarch, the son of Cleopatra of Jerusalem, whom some writers call "Herod Philip II"), as the Gospel of Matthew and Gospel of Mark state that Herodias was married to a "Philip". Because he was the grandson of Simon Boethus, he is sometimes also called Herod Boethus, but there is no evidence he was actually thus called during his lifetime.

== Life and marriage ==
Schematic family tree showing the Herods of the Bible

Herod the Great's execution of his two sons born by his Hasmonean wife Mariamne, Alexander and Aristobulus IV in 7 BC, left the latter's daughter Herodias orphaned and a minor. Herod engaged her to Herod II, her half-uncle, and her connection to the Hasmonean bloodline supported her new husband's right to succeed his father.

As Josephus reports in Jewish Antiquities (Book XVIII, Chapter 5, 4):

Herodias, [...], was married to Herod, the son of Herod the Great by Mariamne, the daughter of Simon the High Priest. [Herod II and Herodias] had a daughter, Salome...

This led to opposition to the marriage from Antipater II, Herod the Great's eldest son, and so Herod demoted Herod II to second in line to the succession. Antipater's execution in 4 BC for plotting to poison his father seemed to leave Herod II, now the eldest surviving son of Herod the Great, as first in line, but his mother's knowledge of the poison plot, and failure to stop it, led to his being dropped from this position in Herod I's will just days before he died. Herod II lived in Rome with Herodias as a private citizen and therefore survived his father's deathbed purges. Herod Antipas and his other remaining half-brothers shared Judaea amongst them.

== Divorce ==
Herodias later married Herod II's half-brother, Herod Antipas. According to Josephus:

Herodias took upon her to confound the laws of our country, and divorced herself from her husband while he was alive, and was married to Herod Antipas

According to Matthew 14:3–5 and Luke 3:18–20, it was this proposed marriage that John the Baptist opposed. The Gospel of Matthew indicates that John was executed because he criticized this marriage (Matthew 14:3–12). Nothing is known of Herod II after his divorce.

== Family tree of the Herodian dynasty ==
There are three princes by the name Phasael in the Herodian dynasty, all three mentioned by Josephus in "War" (BJ) and "Antiquities" (AJ):

- Phasael I, son of Antipater and Cypros (BJ 1.181; AJ 14.121)
- Phasael II, son of Phasael I (BJ 1.266; AJ 17.196)
- Phasael III, son of Herod the Great (BJ 1.181; AJ 14.121) and father of Cypros/Kypros, wife of Agrippa I

Antipater the Idumaean procurator of Judea
1.Doris; 2.Mariamne I 3.Mariamne II; 4.Malthace	Herod I the Great king of Judea	5.Cleopatra of Jerusalem; 6.Pallas; 7.Phaidra; 8.Elpis	Phasael governor of Jerusalem
(1) Antipater co-regent of Judaea	(2) Alexander I	(2) Aristobulus IV	(3) Herod II (Herod Philip)	(4) Herod Archelaus ethnarch of Judea, Idumea	(4) Herod Antipas tetrarch of Galilea & Perea	(5) Philip the Tetrarch of Iturea & Trachonitis
Tigranes V of Armenia	Alexander II	Herod Agrippa I king of Judea	Herod V ruler of Chalcis	Aristobulus Minor
Tigranes VI of Armenia	Herod Agrippa II king of Judea	Aristobulus ruler of Chalcis
Gaius Julius Alexander ruler of Cilicia
Gaius Julius Agrippa quaestor of Asia	Gaius Julius Alexander Berenicianus proconsul of Asia
Lucius Julius Gainius Fabius Agrippa gymnasiarch
