= Elaiussa Sebaste =

Human settlement

- Ελαιούσα Σεβαστή (Greek)
- Elaeousa Sebaste
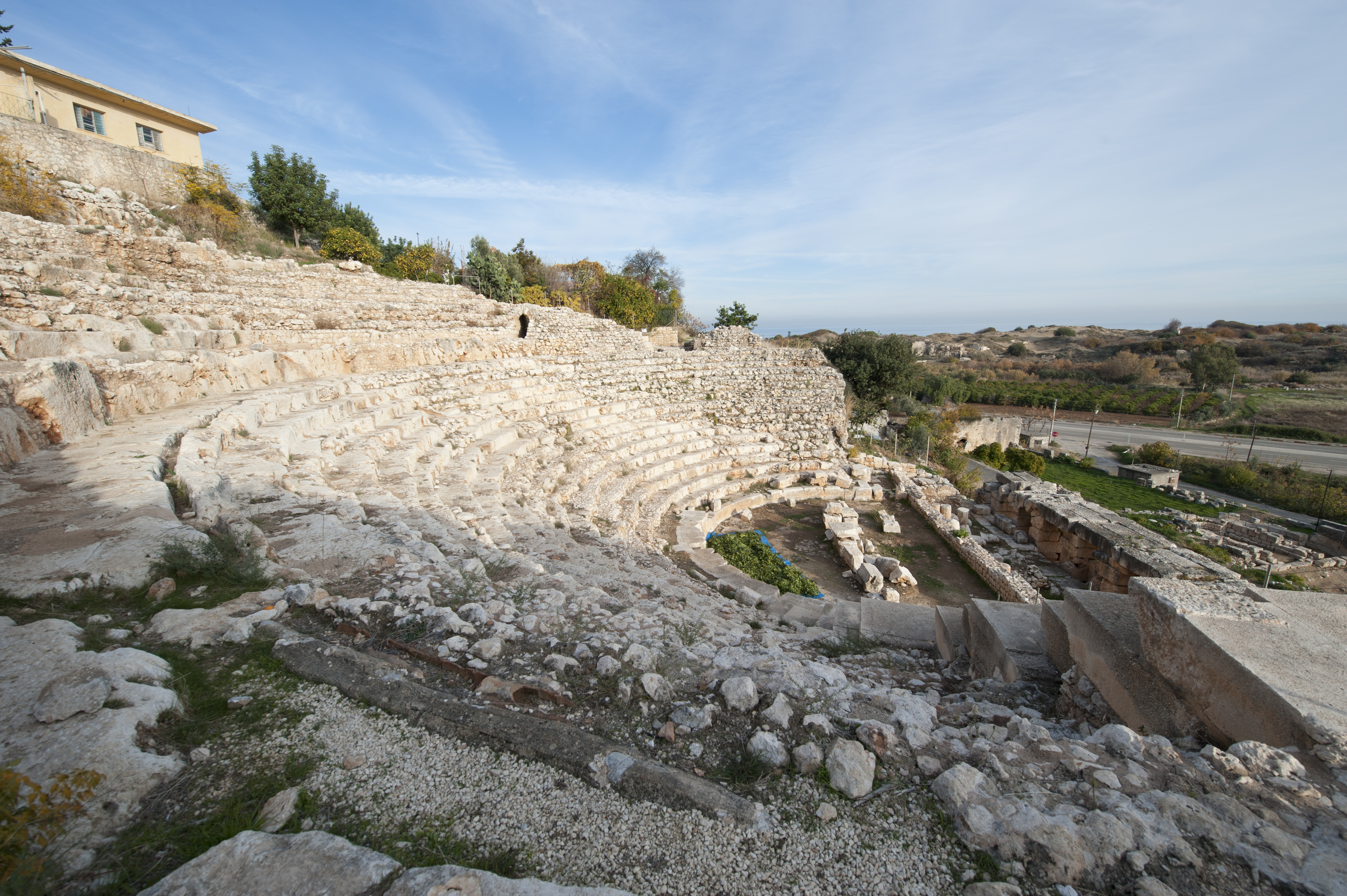
- Theatre in Elaiussa Sebaste

- Location within Turkey
- 36.483624°N 34.173725°E
- Type: Settlement
- Cultures: Cappadocian, Roman, Byzantine
- Location: Mersin Province, Turkey
- Region: Cilicia

History
- Built: 2nd century BCE

Site notes
- Condition: In ruins

Elaiussa Sebaste or Elaeousa Sebaste (Greek: Ελαιούσα Σεβαστή) was an ancient Roman town located 55 km (34 mi) from Mersin in the direction of Silifke in Cilicia on the southern coast of Anatolia (in the modern-day town of Ayaş, Erdemli District in Turkey).

Elaiussa (Ελαιούσα), derives from the word elaion (ἔλαιον), meaning oil in Greek (Elaiussa had many olive trees). It was founded in the 2nd century BC on a tiny island attached to the mainland by a narrow isthmus in the Mediterranean Sea.

Besides the cultivation of olives, the settlement here of the Cappadocian king Archelaus during the reign of the Roman Emperor Augustus played a role in the development of the city. Founding a new city on the isthmus, Archelaus called it Sebaste, which is the Greek equivalent word of the Latin "Augusta". The city entered a golden age when the Roman Emperor Vespasian purged Cilicia of pirates in 74 AD. Towards the end of the 3rd century AD, however, its importance began to wane, owing in large part to incursions by the Sassanian King Shapur I in 260 and later by the Isaurians. The ancient sources tell the history of city's existence and how the churches and basilicas survived into the late Roman and early Byzantine periods. When its neighbor Corycus began to flourish in the 6th century AD, Elaiussa Sebaste was slowly obliterated from the stage of history.

The island that was the site of the first settlement here, where excavations have been underway since 1995 headed by Italian archeologist Eugenia Equini Schneider, is almost completely buried under sand. The original settlement, at a location that provided security for the harbors on either side, is a peninsula today. The ruins of a bath, a cistern, a defense wall and a breakwater can be seen on the side overlooking the western bay of the peninsula. But the most important remains unearthed in the city are a bath whose floor is paved with mosaics and a small basilica on a circular base.

On the opposite side of the highway D.400 that divides Elaiussa and Sebaste today stands a theater dating to the 2nd century AD, an extremely small structure with only 23 rows of seats, whose steps and decorations succumbed to centuries of plunder. Next to the theater is the agora, built in all great probability during the imperial period. At the entrance of the agora, which is surrounded by a semi-destroyed defense wall once rose two monumental fountains in the shape of lions. Inside the agora stands a large church, its floor is covered by sand to protect the mosaic pavement. Elaiussa's only temple stands outside the city on a hill overlooking the sea. Only two of the Corinthian columns of this temple, which had twelve on the long and six on the short side originally, are standing today. A large bath complex among the lemon groves between the temple and the agora was built by a technique characteristic of the ancient Roman period and little used in Anatolia.

The ruins of Elaiussa Sebaste also harbor the richest and most impressive necropolis among the cities of ancient Cilicia. The "Avenue of Graves", located on a hill to the north of the city, preserves close to a hundred graves of various shapes and sizes scattered among the lemon trees. The aesthetic forms of these monumental graves of Cilicia Tracheia are remarkable.

The ancient aqueducts that carried water to the ruins from the Lamos ("Lemon") river also adorn the city's two entrances. The aqueduct to the west of the city in particular is in relatively good condition. Centuries ago these aqueducts formed a canal system that ran all the way to Corycus.

A lidded sarcophagus lies on a small rise exactly opposite the aqueduct. Known as "the Grave of the Princess", this sarcophagus is a prime example of the Anatolian tomb tradition.

== Gallery ==
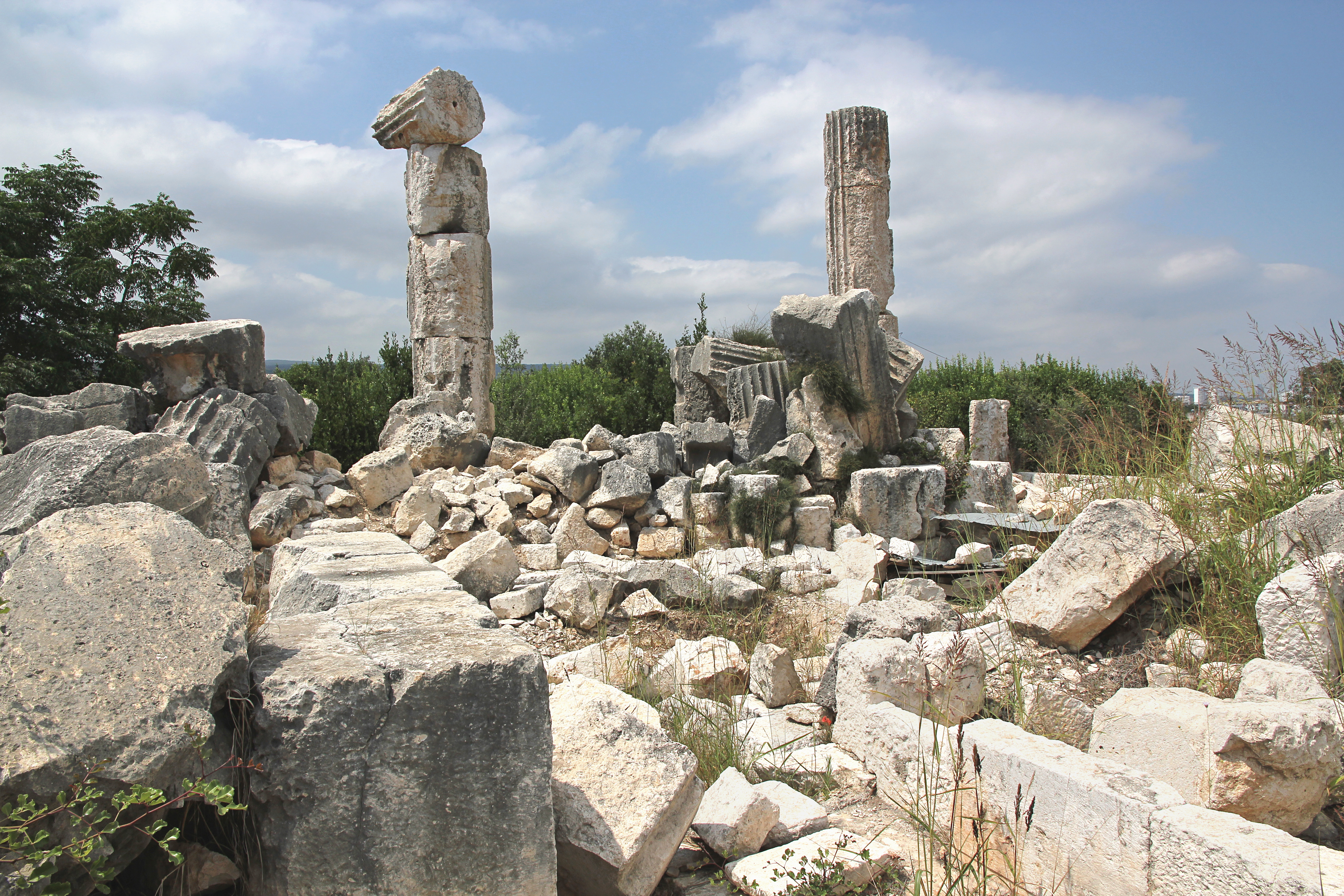
Temple

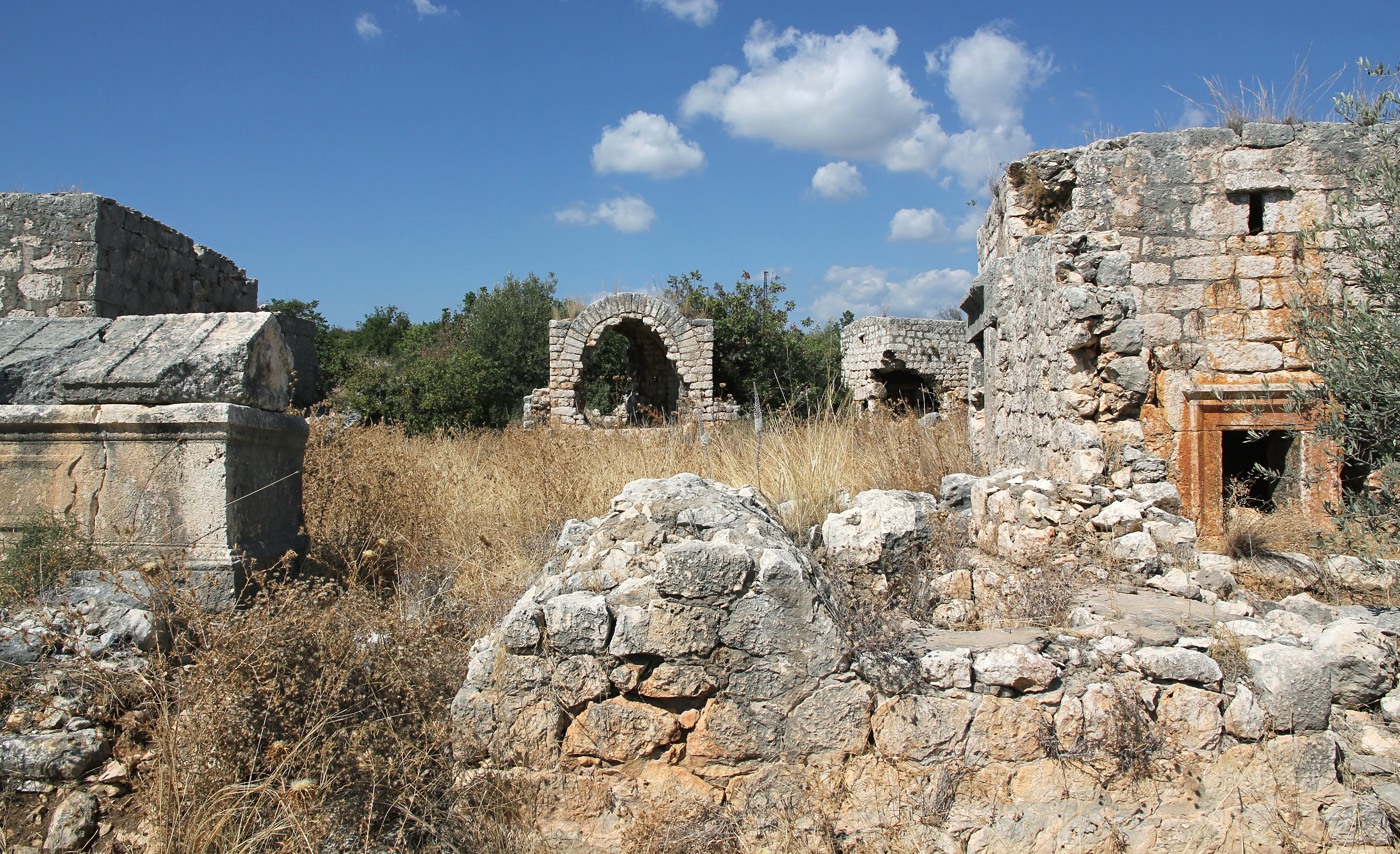
Necropolis

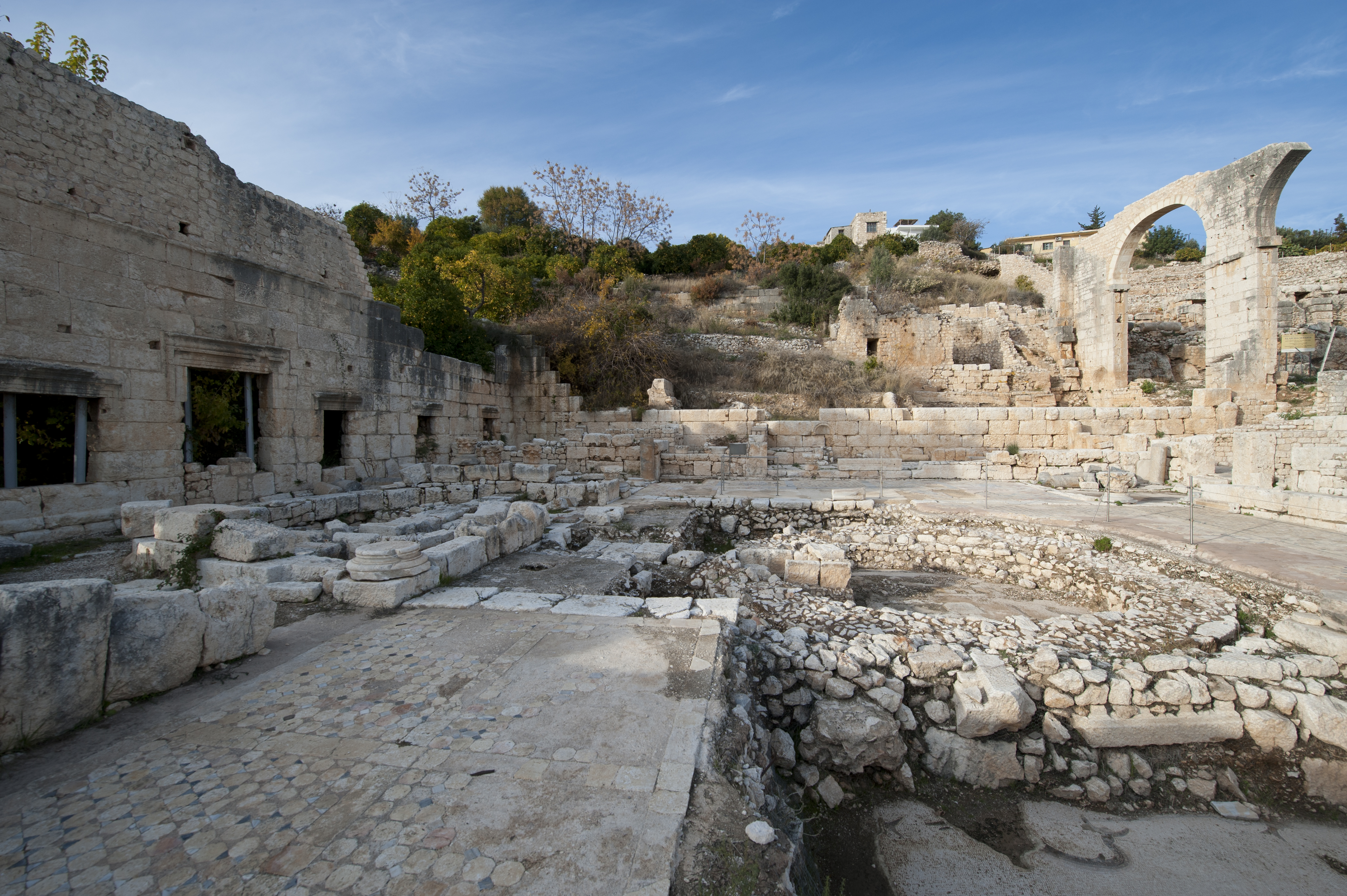
Agora

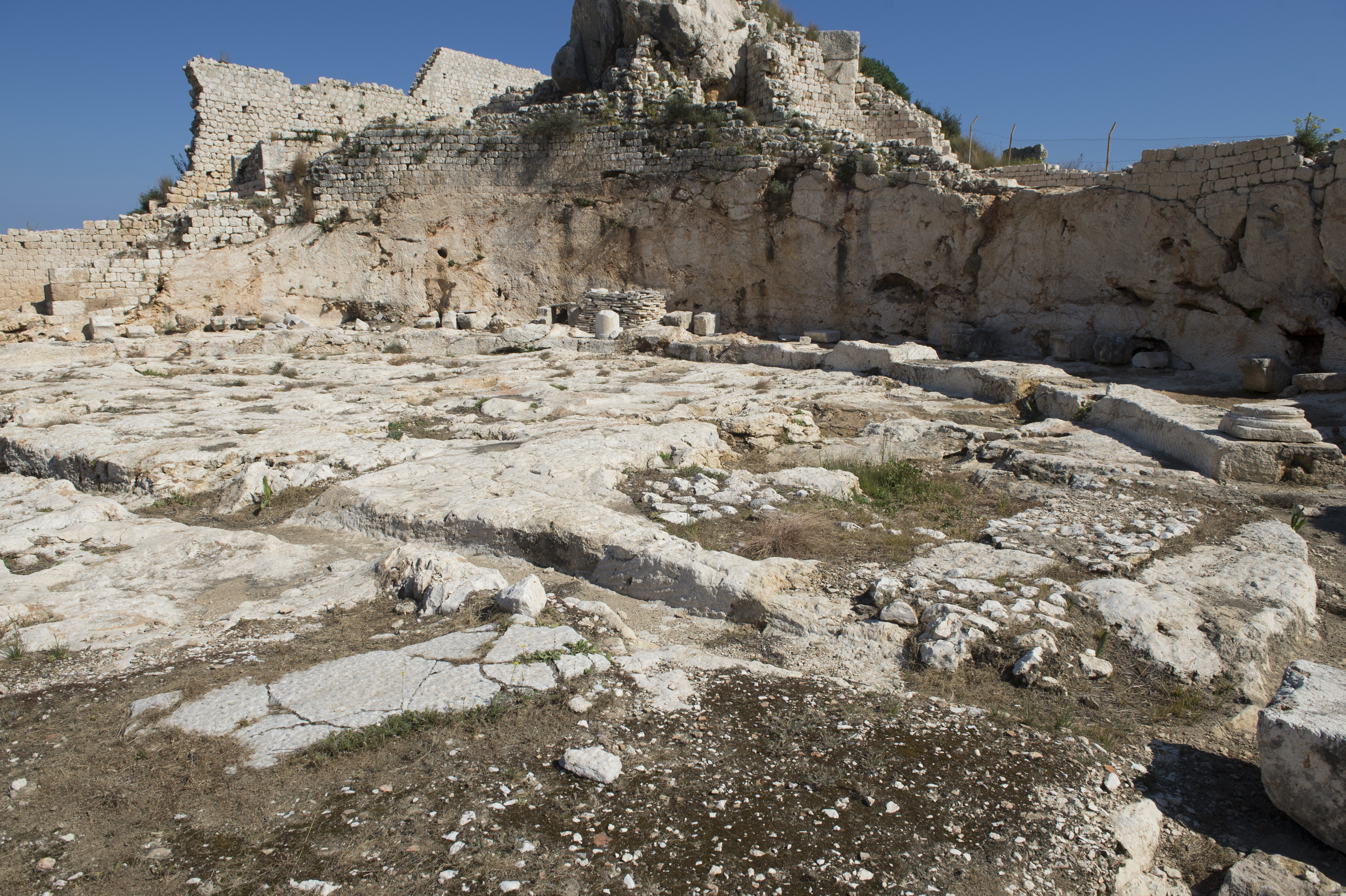
Byzantine Palace

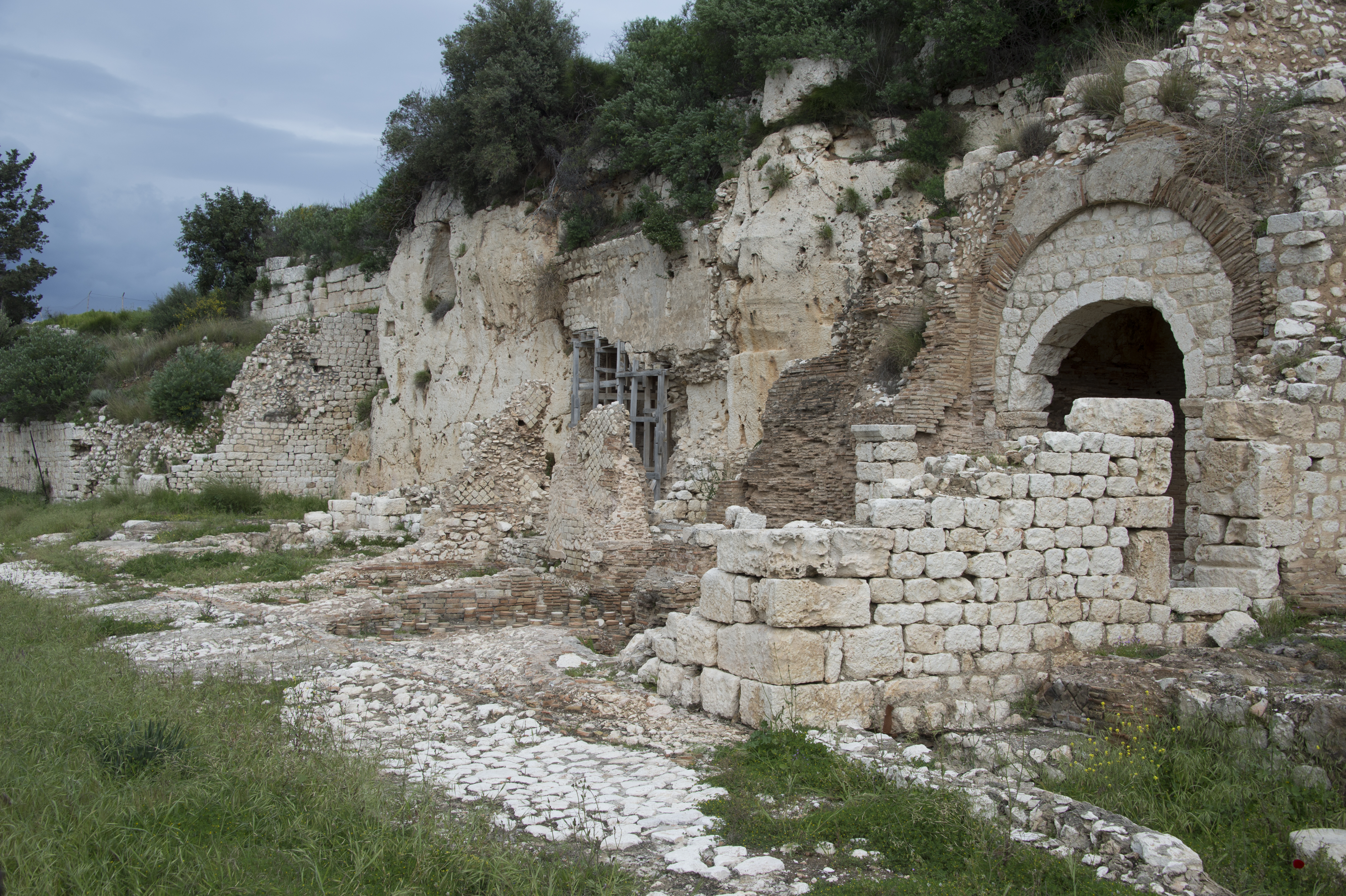
Harbour Bath

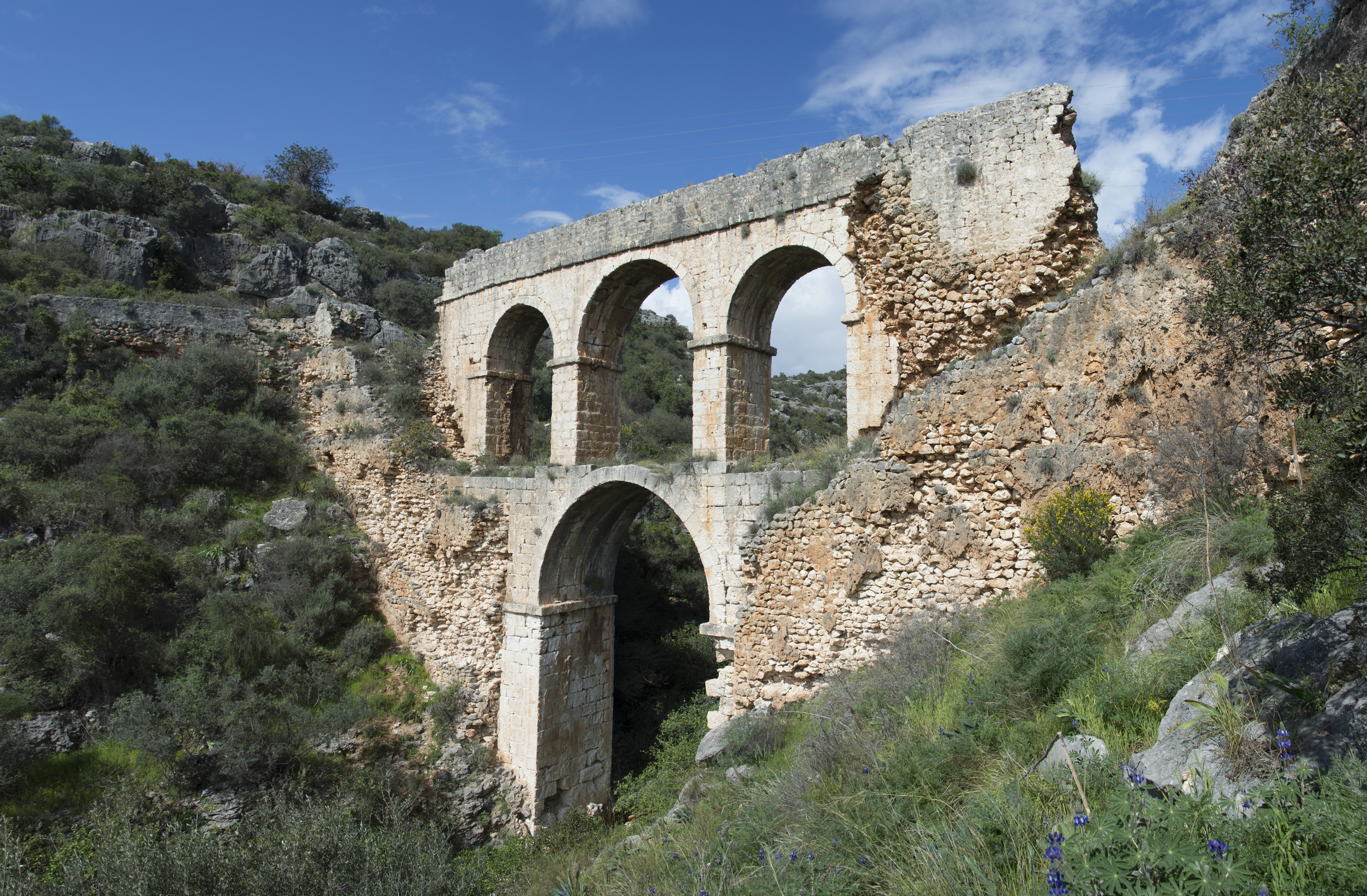
Aqueduct
