= Antipater (son of Herod the Great) =

Son of Herod the Great

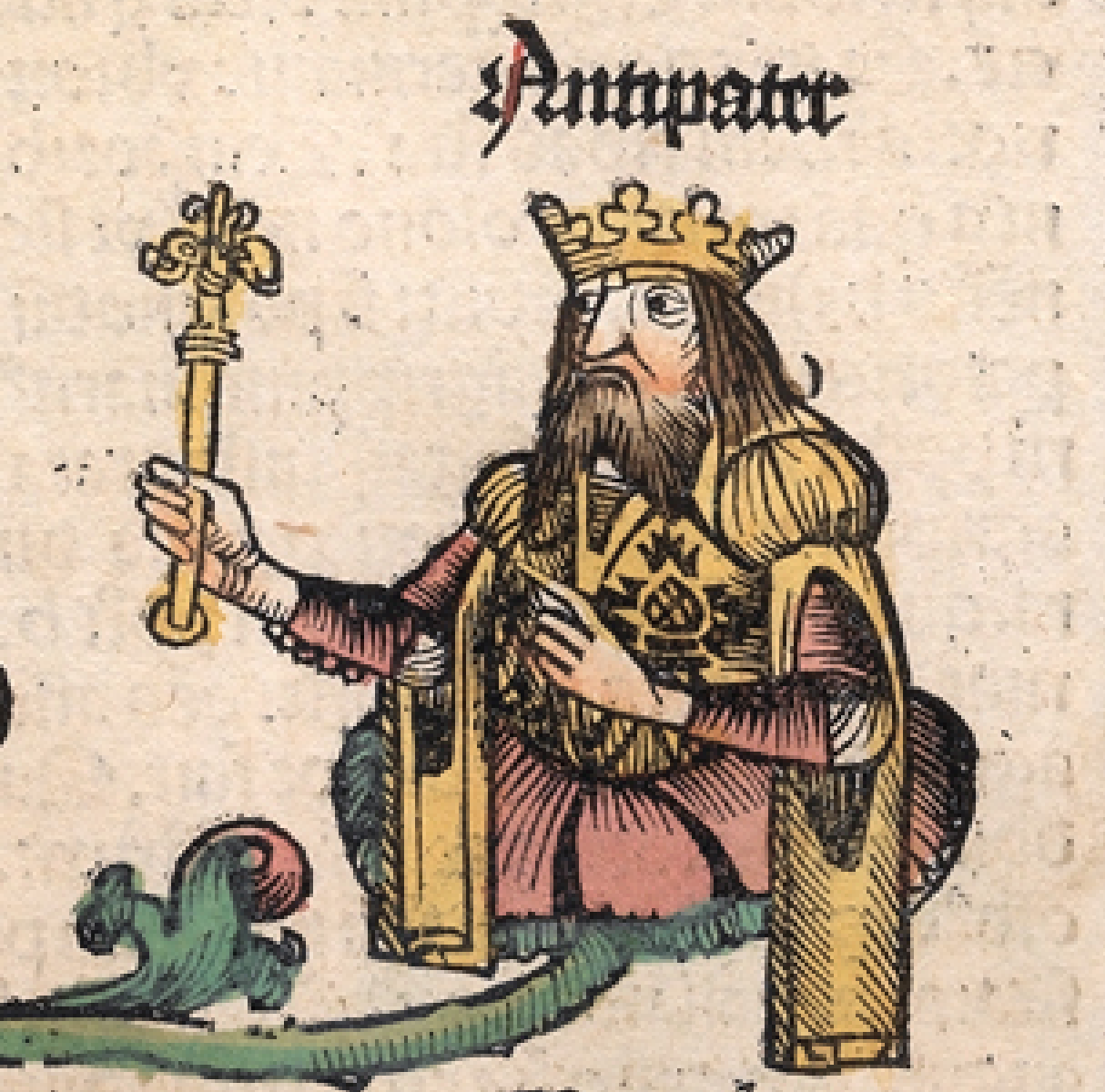
- Antipater, in the 1493 Nuremberg Chronicle

heir of Judea
- Born: c. 46 BC
- Died: 4 BC
- Spouse: Mariamne III; Daughter of Antigonus II Mattathias
- Dynasty: Herodian dynasty
- Father: Herod the Great
- Mother: Doris

Antipater II (Ancient Greek: Ἀντίπατρος, romanized: Antípatros; c. 46 – 4 BC) was the eldest son of Herod the Great.

== Biography ==
Antipater was Herod the Great's first-born son and only child by his first wife Doris. He was named after his paternal grandfather Antipater the Idumaean. He and his mother were exiled after Herod divorced her between 43 BC and 40 BC to marry Mariamne I. He was recalled following Mariamne's fall in 29 BC and in 13 BC Herod made him his first heir in his will. He retained this position even when Alexander and Aristobulus (Herod's sons by Mariamne) rose in the royal succession in 12 BC, and even became exclusive successor to the throne after their execution in 7 BC (with Herod II in second place).

However, in 5 BC Antipater was brought before Publius Quinctilius Varus, then Roman governor of Syria, charged with the intended murder of his father Herod. Antipater was found guilty by Varus; however, due to Antipater's high rank, it was necessary for emperor Augustus to approve of the recommended sentence of death. After the guilty verdict, Antipater's position as exclusive successor was removed and granted to Herod Antipas. After Augustus approved the sentence in 4 BC, Antipater was executed and Archelaus (from the marriage with Malthace) was made heir in his father's will as king over Herod's entire kingdom (with Antipas and Philip as tetrarchs over certain territories).

Concerning Antipater's execution following on the heel of Herod's executions a couple of years before of his sons Alexander and Aristobulus, it would be recounted in the compendium Saturnalia (compiled by Macrobius) that Augustus remarked "It is better to be Herod's pig than his son."

Antipater's wives are known through the writings of Josephus. First was his niece Mariamne III, daughter of Aristobulus IV. The second was a high-ranking Hasmonean princess whose first name is unknown. She was the daughter of Antigonus the Hasmonean, the last Hasmonean king who also served as high priest. This wife of Antipater was also a first cousin of Antipater's first step-mother Mariamne I. Josephus records that his second wife was at the palace with his mother in support of him during his trial before Varus in 5 BC.

== In literature ==
In Robert Graves' 1946 novel King Jesus Antipater is depicted as having secretly married a 15-year-old Mary, who is of a royal Jewish line to strengthen his position among Herod's many sons as future King of the Jews. The pregnant Mary is compelled to pretend to marry an old, pious carpenter, Joseph, to protect herself and the unborn Jesus after her husband's death.

== See also ==
- Genealogy of Jesus
- Historical Jesus
