= Mariamne (third wife of Herod) =

Jewish noblewoman and a wife of Herod I

Mariamne II was the third wife of Herod the Great. She was the daughter of Simon Boethus the High Priest. Josephus recounts their wedding thus:

There was one Simon, a citizen of Jerusalem, the son of one Boethus, a citizen of Alexandria, and a priest of great note there; this man had a daughter, who was esteemed the most beautiful woman of that time; and when the people of Jerusalem began to speak much in her commendation, it happened that Herod was much affected with what was said of her; and when he saw the damsel, he was smitten with her beauty, yet did he entirely reject the thoughts of using his authority to abuse her, as believing, what was the truth, that by so doing he should be stigmatized for violence and tyranny; so he thought it best to take the damsel to wife. And while Simon was of a dignity too inferior to be allied to him, but still too considerable to be despised, he governed his inclinations after the most prudent manner, by augmenting the dignity of the family, and making them more honourable; so he immediately deprived Jesus, the son of Phabet, of the high priesthood, and conferred that dignity on Simon, and so joined in affinity with him [by marrying his daughter].

She had one child by Herod, called Herod II or Herod Boethus, who married his niece, Herodias, and by her had a daughter, Salome.

Mariamne II was implicated in the plot of Antipater against her husband (Herod) in 4 BCE. As a result, Herod divorced her and removed her father (Simon Boethus) as high priest. Additionally, her son Herod II was removed from the line of succession in Herod's last will.

== See also ==
- Mariamne – for the derivation of her name
