= Malthace =

Sixth wife of Herod the Great

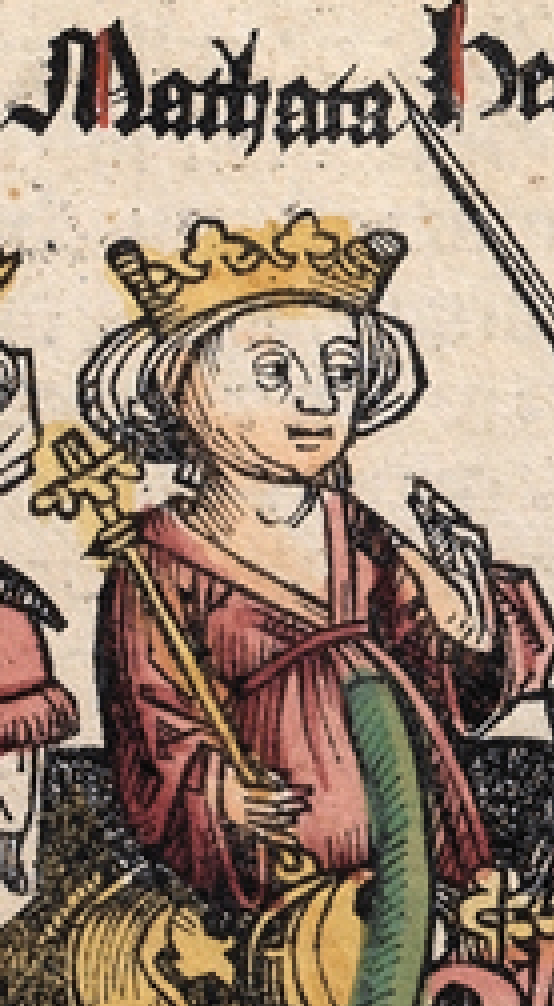
- Malthace, in the 1493 Nuremberg Chronicle
- Died: 4 BCE
- Spouse: Herod the Great
- Issue: Herod Antipas; Archelaus; Olympias
- Dynasty: Herodian dynasty

Malthace (Greek: Μαλθάκη, romanized: Malthákē) was a Samaritan woman who lived in the latter half of the 1st century BC. She was one of the wives of Herod the Great and the mother by Herod of Herod Antipas, Archelaus, and a daughter, Olympias. She died in 4 BC at Rome, while her sons Archelaus and Antipas were disputing the will of their father before the emperor Augustus.
