= Berenice (daughter of Herod Agrippa) =

1st-century CE member of Herodian Dynasty of Judaea

- Bronze Bust from the atrium of the Villa of the Papyri in Herculaneum, National Museum

Queen consort of Chalcis
- Tenure: 44 – 48

Queen consort of Pontus
- Tenure: c. 50

Ruler of the Herodian dynasty
- Reign: 48 – after 79
- Co-ruler: Herod Agrippa II
- Born: 28
- Died: after 79
- Spouse: Marcus Julius Alexander; Herod of Chalcis; Polemon II of Pontus
- Issue: Berenicianus; Hyrcanus
- Dynasty: Herodian
- Father: Herod Agrippa I
- Mother: Cypros

Berenice of Cilicia, also known as Julia Berenice and sometimes spelled Bernice (Greek: Βερενίκη or Βερνίκη, Bereníkē or Berníkē; 28 – after 81), was a Jewish client queen of the Roman Empire during the second half of the 1st century. Berenice was a member of the Herodian dynasty that ruled the Roman province of Judaea between 39 BC and 92 AD. She was the daughter of King Herod Agrippa I and Cypros and a sister of King Herod Agrippa II.

What little is known about her life and background comes mostly from the early historian Flavius Josephus, who detailed a history of the Jewish people and wrote an account of the Jewish Rebellion of 67. Suetonius, Tacitus, Dio Cassius, Aurelius Victor, and Juvenal also write about her. She is also mentioned in the Acts of the Apostles (25:13, 23; 26:30). However, it is for her tumultuous love life that she is primarily known since the Renaissance. Her reputation was based on the bias of the Romans against Eastern princesses like Cleopatra, or later Zenobia. After two marriages in which she was widowed in her 40s, she spent much of the remainder of her life at the court of Herod Agrippa II, amidst rumors the two were carrying on an incestuous relationship, though this was never proved. During the First Jewish-Roman War, she began a love affair with the future emperor Titus Flavius Vespasianus. However, her unpopularity among the Romans compelled Titus to dismiss her on his accession as emperor in 79. When he died two years later, she disappeared from the historical record.

== Early life ==
Schematic family tree showing Berenice in the Herodian Dynasty and her appearance in the New Testament

Berenice was born in 28 to Herod Agrippa and Cypros, as granddaughter to Aristobulus IV and great-granddaughter to Herod the Great. Her elder brother was Agrippa II (b. 27), and her younger sisters were Mariamne (b. 34) and Drusilla (b. 38). According to Josephus, there was also a younger brother called Drusus, who died before his teens. Her family constituted part of what is known as the Herodian Dynasty, who ruled the Judaea Province between 39 BC and 92 AD.

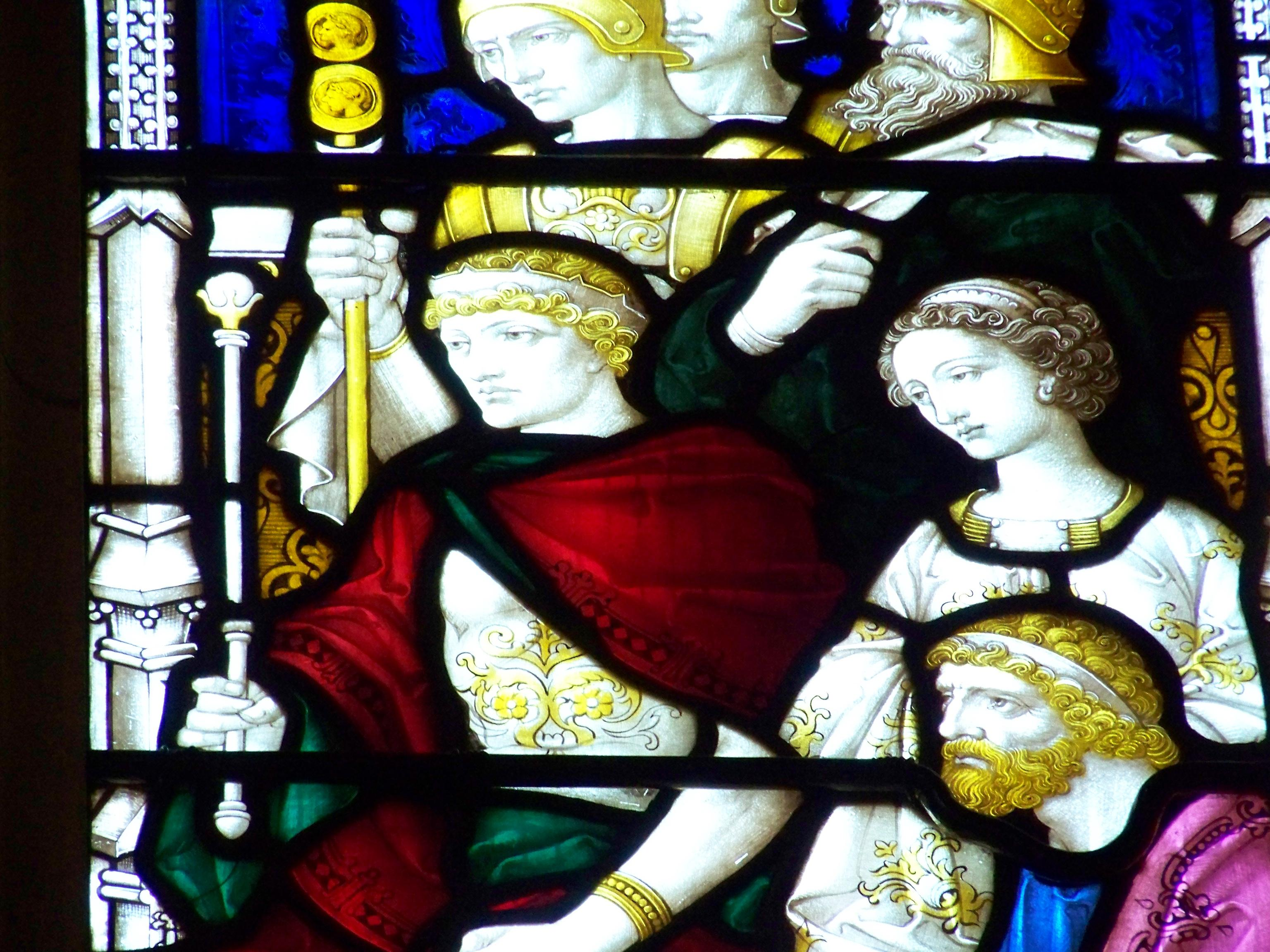
Berenice depicted with her brother Agrippa II during the trial of St. Paul. From a stained glass window in St Paul's Cathedral, Melbourne

Josephus records three short-lived marriages in Berenice's life, the first which took place sometime between 41 and 43, when she was between the ages of 13 and 15, to Marcus Julius Alexander, nephew of the exegete and philosopher Philo of Alexandria, brother of Tiberius Julius Alexander and son of Alexander the Alabarch of the port city Alexandria. On his early death in 44, she was married to her father's brother, Herod of Chalcis, with whom she had two sons, Berenicianus and Hyrcanus. After her husband died in 48, she lived with her brother Agrippa for several years and then married Polemon II of Pontus, king of Cilicia, whom she subsequently deserted. According to Josephus, Berenice requested this marriage to dispel rumors that she and her brother were carrying on an incestuous relationship, with Polemon being persuaded to this union mostly on account of her wealth. However the marriage did not last, and she soon returned to the court of her brother. Josephus was not the only ancient writer to suggest incestuous relations between Berenice and Agrippa. Juvenal, in his sixth satire, outright claims that they were lovers. Whether this was based on truth remains unknown. Berenice indeed spent much of her life at the court of Agrippa and by all accounts shared almost equal power. Popular rumors may also have been fueled by the fact that Agrippa never married.

Berenice was a co-ruler of her brother Agrippa II. The Acts of the Apostles records that during this time, Paul the Apostle appeared before their court at Caesarea.

An inscription of an honorific statue of Berenice set up in Athens, dated to 61 AD, refers to Berenice as basilissa, a title given by Josephus to Jewish queens who ruled in their own right. Berenice is called regina ("queen") in the Latin inscription discovered at Beyrout, in which her name appears to precede that of her brother Agrippa.

== During Jewish-Roman wars ==
=== Early phase of the revolt ===
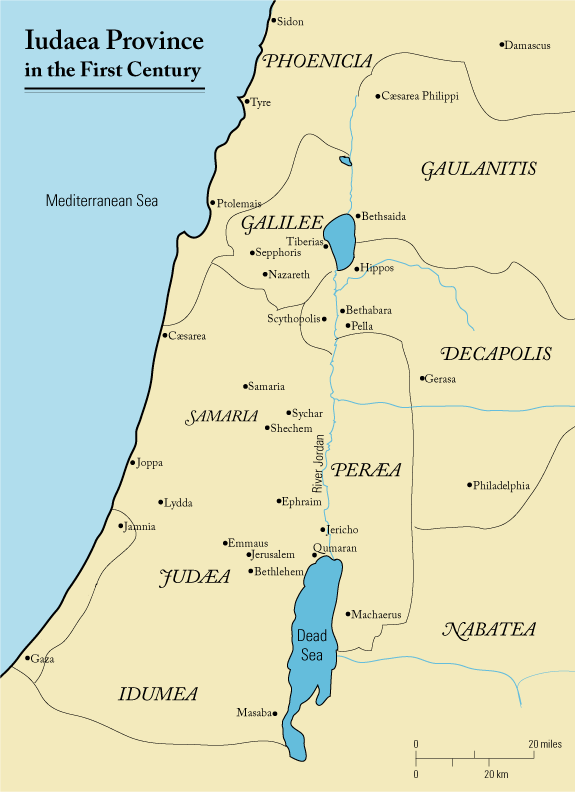
Map of 1st century Judaea.

In 64 emperor Nero appointed Gessius Florus as procurator of the Judaea Province. During his administration, the Jews were systematically discriminated against in favour of the Greek population of the region. Tensions quickly rose to civil unrest when Florus plundered the treasury of the Temple of Jerusalem under the guise of imperial taxes. Following riots, the instigators were arrested and crucified by the Romans. Appalled at the treatment of her countrymen, Berenice travelled to Jerusalem in 66 to personally petition Florus to spare the Jews. Not only did he refuse to comply with her requests, Berenice was nearly killed during skirmishes in the city. Likewise a plea for assistance to the legate of Syria, Cestius Gallus, met with no response.

To prevent violence from further escalating, Agrippa assembled the populace and delivered a speech to the crowd in the company of his sister, but the insurgents burned down their palaces. They fled the city to Galilee where they later gave themselves up to the Romans. Meanwhile, Cestius Gallus moved into the region with the Twelfth legion but was unable to restore order and suffered defeat at the battle of Beth-Horon, forcing the Romans to retreat from Jerusalem.

=== Affair with Titus ===
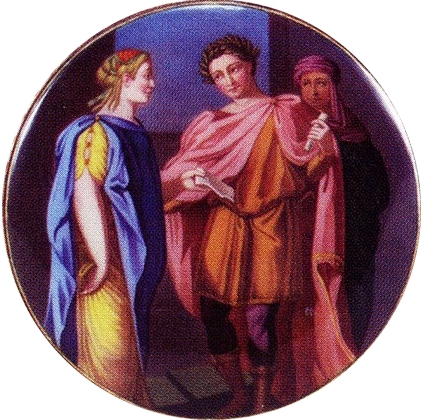
Titus and Berenice, miniature of a pocket watch cover in 1815

Vespasian was then appointed by Emperor Nero to put down the rebellion; he landed in Judaea with the Fifth and Tenth legions in 67. He was later joined at Ptolemais by his son Titus, who brought with him the Fifteenth legion. With a strength of 60,000 professional soldiers, the Romans quickly swept across Galilee and by 69 marched on Jerusalem.

It was during this time that Berenice met and attempted to seduce Titus, who was eleven years her junior. The Herodians sided with the Flavians during the conflict, and later in 69, the Year of the Four Emperors—when the Roman Empire saw the quick succession of the emperors Galba, Otho and Vitellius—Berenice reportedly used all her wealth and influence to support Vespasian in his campaign to become emperor. When Vespasian was declared emperor on 21 December 69, Titus was left in Judaea to finish putting down the rebellion. The war ended in 70 with the destruction of the Second Temple and the sack of Jerusalem, with hundreds of thousands killed and 97,000 taken captive by the Romans. Triumphant, Titus returned to Rome to assist his father in the government, while Berenice stayed behind in Judaea.

== In Rome ==
It took four years until Titus and Berenice reunited, when she and her brother Agrippa II came to Rome in 75. The reasons for this long absence are unclear but have been linked to possible opposition to her presence by Gaius Licinius Mucianus, a political ally of emperor Vespasian who died sometime between 72 and 78. Agrippa II was given the rank of praetor, while Berenice resumed her relationship with Titus, living with him at the palace and reportedly acting in every respect as his wife. The ancient historian Cassius Dio writes that Berenice was at the height of her power during this time, and if it can be any indication as to how influential she was, Quintilian records an anecdote in his Institutio Oratoria where, to his astonishment, he found himself pleading a case on Berenice's behalf where she presided as the judge. The Roman populace however perceived the Eastern queen as an intrusive outsider, and when the pair was publicly denounced by Cynics in the theatre, Titus caved to the pressure and sent her away.

Upon the accession of Titus as emperor in 79, she returned to Rome but was quickly dismissed amidst a number of popular measures of Titus to restore his reputation with the populace. It is possible that he intended to send for her at a more convenient time. However, after reigning barely two years as emperor, he suddenly died on 13 September 81. It is not known what happened to Berenice after her final dismissal from Rome. Agrippa II died around 92, and with him, the Herodian Dynasty's rule over Judaea came to an end with Berenice producing no known heirs.

== Portrayal in the arts ==
From the 17th century to contemporary times, there has been a long tradition of works of art (novels, dramas, operas, etc.) devoted to or featuring Berenice and especially her affair with Titus. The list includes:

- Lettres de Bérénice à Titus (1642), a French novel by Madeleine de Scudéry
- Bérénice (1648–50), a French novel by Jean Regnauld de Segrais
- Tite (1660), a French drama by Jean Magnon
- Il Tito (1666), an Italian opera by Antonio Cesti (mus.) and Nicola Beregani (libr.)
- Bérénice (1670), a French drama by Jean Racine
- Tite et Bérénice (1670), a French drama by Pierre Corneille
- Titus and Berenice (1676), an English drama by Thomas Otway
- Tito e Berenice (1714), an Italian opera by Antonio Caldara (mus.) and Carlo Sigismondo Capace (libr.)
- Berenice (1725), an Italian opera by Giuseppe Maria Orlandini (mus.) and Benedetto Pasqualigo (libr.). Also set to music by Niccolò Vito Piccinni (1766)
- La clemenza di Tito (1734), an Italian opera by librettist Pietro Metastasio, set to music by over 40 composers, including
  - Antonio Caldara (1734)
  - Johann Adolph Hasse (1735)
  - Giuseppe Arena (1738)
  - Francesco Corradini (1747)
  - Christoph Willibald Gluck (1752)
  - Andrea Adolfati (1753)
  - Niccolò Jommelli (1753)
  - Ignaz Holzbauer (1757)
  - Vincenzo Legrezio Ciampi (1757)
  - Gioacchino Cocchi (1760)
  - Marcello Bernardini (1768)
  - Andrea Bernasconi (1768)
  - Pasquale Anfossi (1769)
  - Wolfgang Amadeus Mozart (La clemenza di Tito, 1791)
- Tito e Berenice (1776), an Italian opera by Raimondo Mei (mus.) and Carlo Giuseppe Lanfranchi-Rossi (libr.)
- Tito e Berenice (1782), a ballet by Paolino Franchi (chor.)
- Tito; o, La partenza di Berenice (1790), a ballet by Domenico Maria Gaspero Angiolini (mus. and chor.)
- Tito e Berenice (1793), an Italian opera by Sebastiano Nasolini (mus.) and Giuseppe Maria Foppa (libr.)
- Tito che abbandona Berenice (1828), a painting by Giuseppe Bezzuoli
- Titus et Bérénice (1860), a French opera by Leon-Gustave-Cyprien Gastinel (mus.) and Édouard Fournier (libr.)
- Daniel Deronda (1876), George Eliot's final novel, in which a set of drawings of Berenice's story is an important symbolic element
- Berenice (1890), a German novel by Heinrich Vollrat Schumacher
- Cross Triumphant, The (1898), a historical fiction novel by Florence Morse Kingsley
- Bérénice (1909), a French opera by Alberic Magnard (mus. and libr.)
- Titus und die Jüdin (1911), a German drama by Hans Kyser
- Lost Diaries: From the Diary of Emperor Titus (1913), an English novel by Maurice Baring
- Bérénice, l’Hérodienne (1919), a French drama by Albert du Bois
- Bérénice (1920), incidental music by Marcel Samuel-Rousseau
- Berenice (1922), an English drama by John Masefield
- Bérénice (1934), a French parody by Noel Ouden
- The Jospephus Trilogy (1932 - 1942), historical fiction by Lion Feuchtwanger, in which Berenice plays a prominent role
- Berinikah (1945), a Hebrew drama by Eisig Silberschlag and Carl de Haas
- Le reine de Césarée (1954), a French drama by Robert Brasillach
- Berenice, Princess of Judea (1959), an English novel by Leon Kolb
- Mission to Claudies (1963), an English novel by Leon Kolb
- Agrippa’s Daughter (1964), an English novel by Howard Melvin Fast
- La pourpre de Judée: ou, Les délices du genre humain (1967), a French novel by Maurice Clavel
- Bérénice (1968), a French TV-film by Piere-Alain Jolivet
- Tito y Berenice (1970), a Spanish drama by Rene Marques
- Bérénice (1983), a French TV-film by Raoul Ruiz
- Assassins of Rome (2002) and the Enemies of Jupiter (2003) in Caroline Lawrence's historical youth fiction series The Roman Mysteries
- Lindsey Davis's historical fiction Falco series (circa 1990s - 2010s) incorporates Berenice as a minor recurring character
- The Last Disciple (2004), a historical novel by Hank Hanegraff and Sigmund Brouwer, includes Berenice
- Those About to Die (2024), an American television series based on the book of the same name

In modern history, her aspirations as a potential empress of Rome have led to her being described as a 'miniature Cleopatra'.

== Ancestry ==
Ancestors of Berenice (daughter of Herod Agrippa)

8. Herod the Great
4. Aristobulus IV
9. Mariamne the Hasmonean
2. Herod Agrippa
10. Costobarus
5. Berenice
11. Salome I
1. Berenice
12. Phasael
6. Phasael II
3. Cypros
14. Herod the Great (= 8)
7. Salampsio
15. Mariamne the Hasmonean (= 9)

== See also ==
- List of biblical figures identified in extra-biblical sources
- Paneas (Caesarea Philippi, Neronias, Banias), city with probable palace of Agrippas and Berenice
