= Herod Antipas =

1st-century AD tetrarch of Galilee and Perea (r. 1–39)

- Herod Antipas medallion from Promptuarium Iconum Insigniorum

Tetrarch of Galilee and Perea
- Reign: 4 BC – 39 AD
- Predecessor: Herod the Great (as king)
- Successor: Herod Agrippa I (as king)
- Born: Before 20 BC
- Died: After AD 39; Gallia
- Wives: Phasaelis of Nabataea; Herodias
- Dynasty: Herodian
- Father: Herod I
- Mother: Malthace

Herod Antipas, (Ancient Greek: Ἡρῴδης Ἀντίπας, romanized: Hērṓidēs Antípas; c. 20 BC – c. 39 AD) was a 1st-century Herodian ruler of Galilee and Perea, in the time of the Herodian Tetrarchy. He bore the title of tetrarch ("ruler of a quarter") and is referred to as both "Herod the Tetrarch" and "King Herod" in the New Testament. He was a son of Herod the Great and a grandson of Antipater the Idumaean. Known for his role in the executions of John the Baptist and Jesus of Nazareth (Matthew 14:1–12, Luke 23:5–12), his name is often associated with tyranny and persecution.

Following the death of his father (4 BC in Schürer's 1890 publication, 1 BC according to Jack Finegan, W. E. Filmer, and Andrew Steinmann), Herod Antipas was recognized as tetrarch by Caesar Augustus and subsequently by his brother, the ethnarch Herod Archelaus. Antipas officially ruled Galilee and Perea as a client state of the Roman Empire. He was responsible for building projects at Sepphoris and Betharamphtha, and for the construction of his capital Tiberias on the western shore of the Sea of Galilee. Named in honour of his patron, the emperor Tiberius, the city later became a centre of rabbinic learning after the Jewish–Roman wars.

Antipas divorced his first wife Phasa'el, the daughter of King Aretas IV of Nabatea, in favour of Herodias, who had formerly been married to his half-brother Herod II. (Antipas was Herod the Great's son by Malthace, while Herod II was his son by Mariamne II.) According to the New Testament Gospels, it was John the Baptist's condemnation of this arrangement that led Antipas to have him arrested; John was subsequently put to death in Machaerus. Besides provoking his conflict with John the Baptist, the tetrarch's divorce added a personal grievance to previous disputes with Aretas over territory on the border of Perea and Nabatea. The result was a war that proved disastrous for Antipas; a Roman counter-offensive was ordered by Tiberius but abandoned upon that emperor's death in 37. In 39 Antipas was accused by his nephew Agrippa I of conspiracy against Emperor Caligula, who sent him into exile in Gaul, according to Josephus. Accompanied there by Herodias, he died at an unknown date.

The Gospel of Luke states that Jesus was first brought before Pontius Pilate for trial, since Pilate was the governor of Roman Judea, which encompassed Jerusalem where Jesus was arrested. Pilate initially handed him over to Antipas, in whose territory Jesus had been most active, but Antipas sent him back to Pilate's court.

== Early life ==
Antipas was a son of Herod the Great, who had become king of Judea, and Malthace, who was from Samaria. His date of birth is unknown but was before 20 BC. Antipas, his full brother Archelaus, and his half-brother Philip were educated in Rome.

Antipas was not Herod's first choice of heir. That honour fell to Aristobulus and Alexander, Herod's sons by the Hasmonean princess Mariamne. It was only after they were executed (c. 7 BC), and Herod's oldest son Antipater was convicted of trying to poison his father (5 BC), that Herod fell back on his youngest son Antipas, revising his will to make him heir. During his final illness, Herod had yet another change of heart about the succession. According to the final version of his will, Antipas' elder brother Archelaus was to become king of Judea, Idumea, and Samaria, while Antipas would rule Galilee and Perea with the lesser title of tetrarch. Philip was to receive Iturea, Trachonitis, Batanea, Gaulanitis, Auranitis, and Paneas also with the title of tetrarch.

Because of Judea's status as a Roman client kingdom, Herod's plans for the succession had to be ratified by Emperor Augustus. The three heirs therefore travelled to Rome to make their claims, Antipas arguing he ought to inherit the whole kingdom and the others maintaining that Herod's final will ought to be honoured. Despite qualified support for Antipas from Herodian family members in Rome—who favoured direct Roman rule of Judea but considered Antipas preferable to his brother—Augustus largely confirmed the division of territory set out by Herod in his final will. Archelaus gained the title of ethnarch rather than king.

== Reign ==
Domain given to Herod Antipas, as Tetrarch of Galilee and Perea, by Augustus on the death of Herod

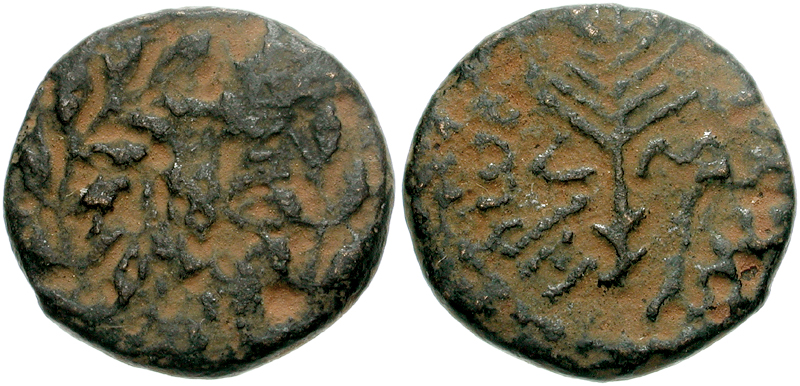
Coin of Herod Antipas

After the death of Herod the Great, Augustus confirmed the testament of the dead king by making Antipas tetrarch of Galilee and Perea, a region he ruled for 42 years. The two territories were separated by the region of the Decapolis, with Galilee to the north and Perea to the south. Threats to stability in both areas would have been clear to Antipas when he took office. While he had been making his case to Augustus in Rome, dissidents had attacked the palace of Sepphoris in Galilee, seizing money as well as weapons which they used to terrorize the area. In a counterattack ordered by Quinctilius Varus, Roman governor of Syria, Sepphoris was destroyed by fire and its inhabitants sold as slaves. Perea, meanwhile, bordered on the Kingdom of Nabatea, which had long had uneasy relations with Romans and Jews.

Part of Antipas' solution was to follow in his father's footsteps as a builder. He rebuilt and fortified Sepphoris, while also adding a wall to Betharamphtha in Perea. The latter city was renamed Livias after Augustus' wife Livia, and later Julias after his daughter. However, the tetrarch's most noted construction was his capital on the western shore of the Sea of Galilee, Tiberias, so named to honour his patron Tiberius, who had succeeded Augustus as emperor in 14 AD. Residents could bathe nearby at the warm springs of Emmaus, and by the time of the First Jewish-Roman War the city's buildings included a stadium, a royal palace, and a sanctuary for prayer. It gave its name to the sea and later became a centre of rabbinic learning after the Jewish-Roman wars. However, pious Jews at first refused to live in it because it was built atop a graveyard and therefore a source of ritual impurity. Antipas had to colonize it with a mixture of foreigners, forced migrants, poor people, and freed slaves.

At other times Antipas was more sensitive to Jewish tradition. His coins carried no images, which would have violated Jewish prescriptions against idolatry. When Pontius Pilate, governor of Judea from 26 to 36, caused offence by placing votive shields in the Antonia palace at Jerusalem, Antipas and his brothers successfully petitioned for their removal.

=== John the Baptist and Jesus ===
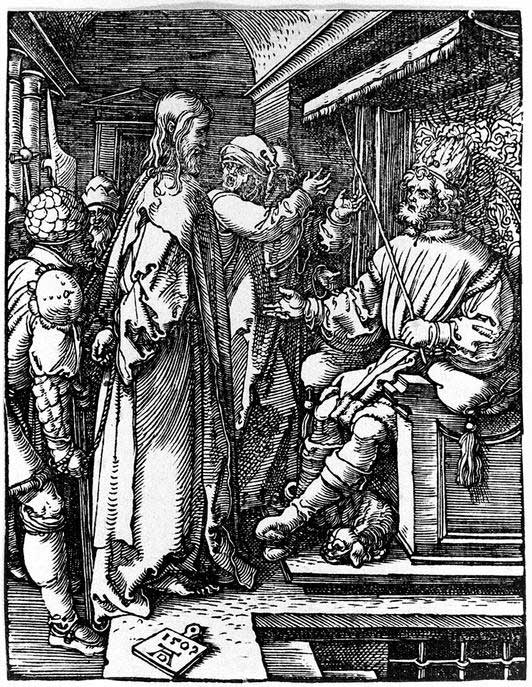
Jesus before Herod Antipas, Albrecht Dürer, 1509

Schematic family tree showing the Herods of the Bible

==== Marriage to Herodias ====
Early in his reign, Antipas had married Phasa'el, the daughter of King Aretas IV of Nabatea. However, on a visit to Rome he stayed with his half-brother Herod II and there he fell in love with his wife, Herodias, granddaughter of Herod the Great and Mariamne I, and the two agreed to marry after Herod Antipas had divorced his wife. Phasa'el learned of the plan and asked permission to travel to the frontier fortress of Machaerus, whence Nabatean forces escorted her to her father. With his daughter safe in his custody, Aretas declared war on Herod. Josephus states that Aretas was joined in this war by "fugitives from the tetrarchy of Phillip", whereas Moses of Chorene states that Aretas was joined by the Edessan army. It is said that the joint Petra-Edessan army prevailed over the forces of Herod Antipas.

It is generally agreed that the war, in which Herod was defeated, occurred in 36, a year before the death of Tiberius.

==== John's ministry and execution ====
Antipas faced more immediate problems in his own tetrarchy after John the Baptist (in 28/29 according to the Gospel of Luke or 27, if the co-regency of Augustus and Tiberius is included in Luke's reckoning of time, for which there is some evidence) began a ministry of preaching and baptism by the Jordan River, which marked the western edge of Antipas' territory of Perea. The Gospels state that John attacked the tetrarch's marriage as contrary to Jewish law (it was incestuous, as Herodias was also Antipas' niece, but also John criticized the fact that she was his brother's wife (Mark 6:18), lending credence to the belief that Antipas and Herodias married while Herod II was still alive), while Josephus says that John's public influence made Antipas fearful of rebellion.

John was imprisoned in Machaerus and later executed by beheading. According to Matthew and Mark, Herod was reluctant to order John's death. However, during his birthday banquet, he had been so pleased by the dancing of Herodias' daughter (unnamed in the text but named by Josephus as Salome), he had sworn an oath and promised to grant whatever she asked. Her mother then prompted her to ask for John's head on a platter. Compelled not to violate his oath to the girl or the guests, Antipas ordered John beheaded.

==== Jesus' ministry and trial ====
Among those baptized by John was Jesus of Nazareth, who began his own ministry in Galilee, causing Antipas, according to Matthew and Mark, to fear that John had been raised from the dead. Luke states that a group of Pharisees warn Jesus to flee because Antipas was plotting his death, whereupon Jesus denounces the tetrarch as a "fox" and declares that he, Jesus, would not fall victim to such a plot to run from heading towards Jerusalem because "it cannot be that a prophet should perish away from Jerusalem".

Luke also credits the tetrarch with a role in Jesus' trial. According to Luke, Pilate, on learning that Jesus was a Galilean and therefore under Herod's jurisdiction, sent him to Antipas, who was also in Jerusalem at the time. Initially, Antipas was pleased to see Jesus, hoping to see him perform a miracle, but when Jesus remained silent in the face of questioning, Antipas mocked him and sent him back to Pilate. Luke states that these events improved relations between Pilate and Herod despite their earlier enmity.

The reason for Antipas' involvement has been debated. Theodor Mommsen argues that the normal legal procedure of the early Roman Empire was for defendants to be tried by the authorities of their home provinces. A. N. Sherwin-White re-examined the relevant legal texts and concluded that trials were generally based on the location of the alleged crimes, but that there was a possibility of referral to a province of origin in special cases. If Pilate was not required to send Jesus to Antipas, he may have been making a show of courtesy to the tetrarch and trying to avoid the need to deal with the Jewish authorities himself. When Jesus was sent back, Pilate could still have represented Antipas' failure to convict as support for his own view (according to Luke) that Jesus was not guilty of a capital offence, thus allowing him to avoid responsibility for Jesus' crucifixion.

With the lack of historical evidence, it has been suggested that Jesus' trial by Antipas is unhistorical. English historian Robin Lane Fox alleges that the story was invented based on Psalm 2, in which "the kings of the earth" are described as opposing the Lord's "anointed", and also served to show that the authorities failed to find grounds for convicting Jesus.

=== Later reign ===
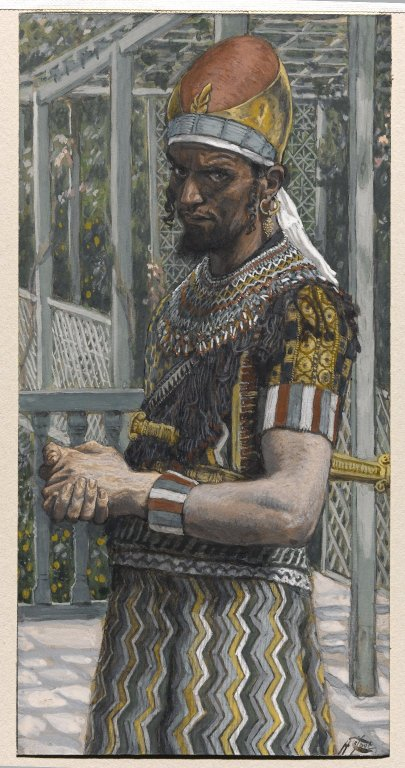
Herod (Hérode), by French painter and Bible illustrator James Tissot, in the Brooklyn Museum

Between 34 and 36 the conflict with Aretas of Nabatea—caused by Antipas' divorce from Aretas' daughter and the rulers' disagreement over territory—developed into open war. Antipas' army suffered a devastating defeat after fugitives from the former tetrarchy of Philip sided with the Nabateans, and Antipas was forced to appeal to Tiberius for help. The emperor ordered Lucius Vitellius, governor of Syria, to march against Aretas and ensure that he was captured or killed. Vitellius obediently mobilized two legions, sending them on a detour around Judea while he joined Antipas in attending a festival at Jerusalem. While staying there he learned of the death of Tiberius (16 March 37), concluded he lacked the authority to go to war, and recalled his troops.

Josephus implies that Vitellius was unwilling to cooperate with the tetrarch because of a grudge he bore from an earlier incident. According to his account, Antipas provided hospitality at a conference on the Euphrates between Vitellius and King Artabanus III of Parthia, and after Vitellius' diplomatic success anticipated the governor in sending a report to Tiberius. However, other sources place the meeting between Vitellius and Artabanus under Tiberius' successor Caligula, leading some historians to think that Josephus misdated it to the reign of Tiberius or conflated it with an earlier diplomatic meeting involving Antipas and Vitellius.

== Fall from grace ==
Antipas' fall from power was due to Caligula and to his own nephew Agrippa, brother of Herodias. When Agrippa fell into debt during the reign of Tiberius despite his connections with the imperial family, Herodias persuaded Antipas to provide for him, but the two men quarrelled, and Agrippa departed. After Agrippa was heard expressing to his friend Caligula his eagerness for Tiberius to die and leave room for Caligula to succeed him, he was imprisoned. When Caligula became emperor in 37, he released his friend and granted him rule of Philip's former tetrarchy (slightly extended), with the title of king.

Josephus relates that Herodias, jealous at Agrippa's success, persuaded Antipas to ask Caligula for the title of king for himself. However, Agrippa simultaneously presented the emperor with a list of charges against the tetrarch: allegedly, he had conspired against Tiberius with Sejanus (executed in 31) and was plotting against Caligula with King Artabanus. As evidence, Agrippa noted that Antipas had a stockpile of weapons sufficient for 70,000 men. Hearing Antipas' admission to this last charge, Caligula decided to believe the allegations of conspiracy.

== Exile and death ==
In the summer of 39, Antipas' money and territory were turned over to Agrippa, while Antipas was exiled. His place of exile is described by Josephus in Antiquities as Lugdunum, a city in Gaul, and as Hispania in The Wars of the Jews. There are two places in France that claim to be the place of exile: Lyon (Lugdunum) and Saint-Bertrand-de-Comminges (Lugdunum Convenae), on the Spanish border. Antipas died in exile. The 3rd-century historian Cassius Dio seems to imply that Caligula had him killed, but this is usually treated with skepticism by modern historians.

== Legacy ==
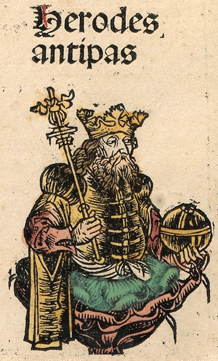
Herod Antipas as portrayed in the Nuremberg Chronicle

Among the followers of Jesus and members of the early Christian movement mentioned in the New Testament are Joanna, the wife of one of Antipas' stewards, and Manaen, a "foster-brother" or "companion" of Antipas (both translations are possible for the Greek σύντροφος). It has been conjectured that these were sources for early Christian knowledge of Antipas and his court. In any case, Antipas featured prominently in the New Testament in connection with the deaths of John the Baptist and Jesus. The pseudepigraphical Gospel of Peter further states that it was Antipas rather than Pilate who ordered the crucifixion of Jesus. In line with the work's anti-Judaic theme, it pointedly remarks that Herod and "the Jews", unlike Pilate, refused to "wash their hands" of responsibility for the death.

Antipas has appeared in a large number of representations of the passion of Jesus—most notably portrayed by Frank Thring in King of Kings (1961), José Ferrer in The Greatest Story Ever Told (1965), and Christopher Plummer in Jesus of Nazareth (1977). Often, as in the films Jesus Christ Superstar (1973) and The Passion of the Christ (2004), Antipas is portrayed as effeminate (Antipas is played in those films by Joshua Mostel and Luca De Dominicis respectively); the origin of this tradition may have been Antipas' manipulation by his wife Herodias, as well as Christ's description of him as a "fox" in Luke 13:32, using a feminine word in the original Greek. In Salome (1953), he is portrayed by Charles Laughton. He was played by Mitchell Lewis in Salomé (1923). He also features in The Secret Magdalene by Ki Longfellow . In Season 4 of Dallas Jenkins' The Chosen, he is portrayed by Paul Ben-Victor. In Gustave Flaubert's Hérodias (1877), Herodias uses her long-concealed daughter, Salome, to manipulate Herod sexually for her own political purposes. This conceit (original to Flaubert) inspired Oscar Wilde's play Salome (1891), the first version of the legend to show Salome with a will of her own, opposing her mother and lusting after John the Baptist. Naive and puzzled by her stepfather's lascivious attentions, the young girl arouses Herod in order to avenge herself on the prophet who has refused her advances. Flaubert's novella was turned into an opera by Jules Massenet (Hérodiade, 1881) in which Salome, ignorant of her royal parentage, becomes a disciple of John, who is then executed by the lustful and jealous Herod (a baritone). In Richard Strauss's operatic setting of Wilde's play (1905), Herod (a tenor) is depicted as befuddled by both drink and lust, and in bitter conflict with his wife (as in Flaubert). At the end of the opera (as in Wilde's play), disgusted with Salome's behavior with the head of John, he orders her execution. In Journey to Bethlehem, he is portrayed as the semi-loyal son of Herod and struggles to follow his father's commands.

== Family tree ==
Aretas IV; King of Arabia
Phasaelis	Herod Antipas

Simon Boethus (High Priest)	Alexander I	Alexandra	Antipater the Idumaean	Cypros (Nabatean)
Aristobulus III d. 35 BCE
Doris	Cleopatra of Jerusalem	Mariamne II	Mariamne I d. 29 BCE	Malthace (Samaritan)	Herod the Great	Salome I	Phasa'el	Pheroras	Joseph
Alexander II d. 7 BCE
Berenice (daughter of Salome I)	Aristobulus IV d. 7 BCE
Herod II	Herodias	Herod Antipas	Mariamne III	Herod Archelaus	Glaphyra	Olympias	Joseph ben Joseph
Philip the Tetrarch d. 34 CE	Salome	Aristobulus of Chalcis
Antipater II d. 4 BCE

== See also ==
- Herodian dynasty
- Herodian kingdom
- List of biblical figures identified in extra-biblical sources

== Notes ==
Herod Antipas House of Herod Died: after 39 AD
Preceded by Herod I	Tetrarch of Galilee; 4 BC – 39 AD	Succeeded by Agrippa I
