= Salampsio =

Eldest daughter of Herod the Great

Salampsio (Hebrew: שלומציון, Shlomtzion) was the eldest daughter of Herod the Great by his royal Hasmonean wife, Mariamne I.

== Family ==
=== Marriage and Children ===
She was married to Phasael, the son of Phasael, Herod's brother (her uncle's son). The marriage resulted in five children: Antipater, Herod, Alexander, Alexandra, and Cypros.

=== Grandchildren ===
Cypros married Herod Agrippa, the son of Aristobulus IV and was the mother of Herod Agrippa II, Berenice, Mariamne, and Drusilla; and Alexandra married Timius of Cyprus.
