= Herod Agrippa II =

1st-century Judean ruler

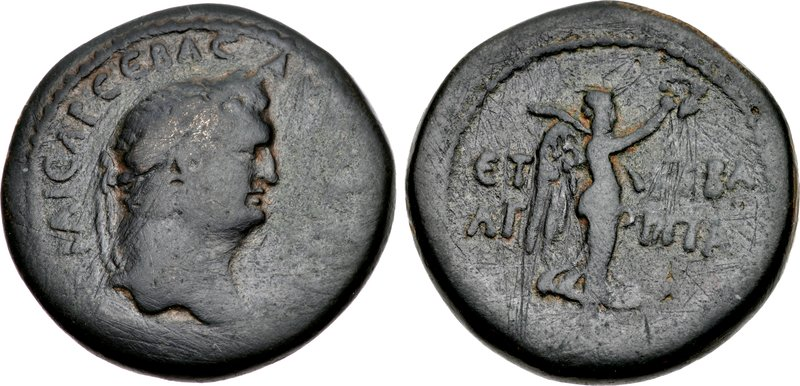
- Bronze coin minted under Agrippa II bearing laureate bust of Titus

King in Galilee and Perea
- Reign: 55–c. 92/100 AD
- Predecessor: Herod Agrippa I (indirect, reigned over all of Galilee and Perea)

King of Iturea, Trachonitis, Batanea, Gaulanitis, Auranitis, and Paneas King in Syria
- Reign: 53–c. 92/100 AD

Tetrarch of Chalcis
- Reign: 48–53 AD
- Successor: Aristobulus V (indirect)
- Born: 27/28 AD
- Died: c. 92 or 100
Names
- Marcus Julius Agrippa
- Dynasty: Herodian
- Father: Herod Agrippa I
- Mother: Cypros

Herod Agrippa II (Roman name: Marcus Julius Agrippa, Hebrew: אגריפס; AD 27/28 – c. 92 or 100), sometimes shortened to Agrippa II or Agrippa, was the last ruler from the Herodian dynasty, reigning over territories outside of Judea as a Roman client. Agrippa II fled Jerusalem in 66, fearing the Jewish uprising, and he supported the Roman side in the First Jewish–Roman War.

== Early life ==
Herod Agrippa II was the son of the first and better-known Herod Agrippa and the brother of Berenice, Mariamne, and Drusilla (second wife of the Roman procurator Antonius Felix). He was raised and educated at the court of the emperor Claudius. Because he was only 17 years old at the time of his father's death, Claudius kept him in Rome and sent Cuspius Fadus as procurator of the Roman province of Judaea. While in Rome, Agrippa voiced his support for the Jews to Claudius and against the Samaritans and the procurator of Judaea Province, Ventidius Cumanus, who was thought to have been the cause of some disturbances there.

== Rise in power ==
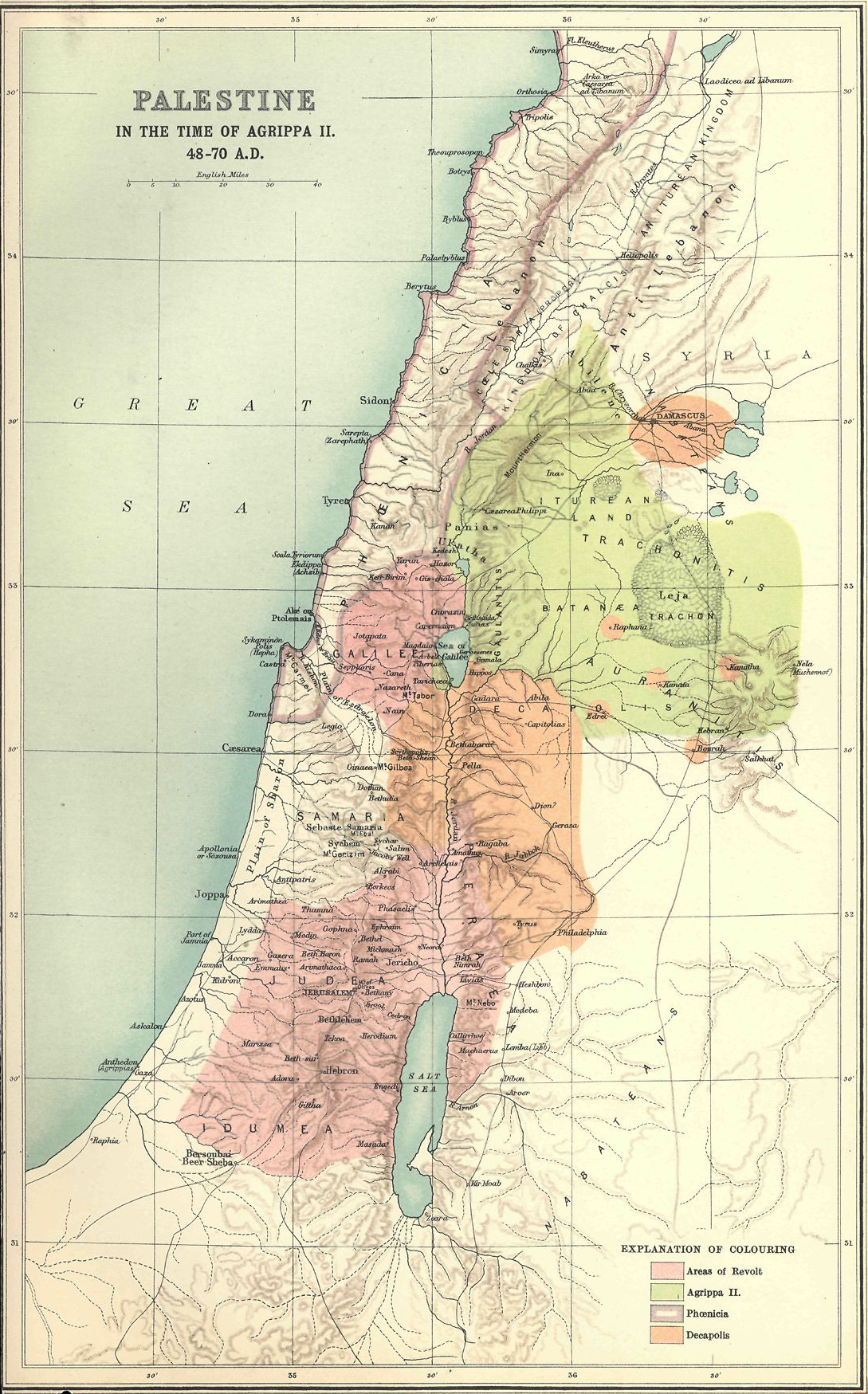
Map of Judea in the time of Agrippa II

Schematic family tree showing the Herods of the Bible

On the death of king Herod of Chalcis in 48, his small Syrian realm of Chalcis was given to Agrippa, with the right of superintending the Temple in Jerusalem and appointing its high priest, but only as a tetrarch.

In 53, Agrippa was forced to give up the tetrarchy of Chalcis, but in exchange Claudius made him ruler with the title of king over the territories previously governed by Philip—Iturea, Trachonitis, Batanea, Gaulanitis, Auranitis and Paneas—as well as the kingdom of Lysanias in Abila. The tetrarchy of Chalcis was subsequently in 57 given to his cousin Aristobulus (Acts 25:13; 26:2,7). Agrippa celebrated by marrying off his two sisters Mariamne and Drusilla. Josephus, the Jewish historian, repeats the gossip that Agrippa lived in an incestuous relationship with his sister Berenice.

In 55, the Emperor Nero added to Agrippa's realm the cities of Tiberias and Taricheae in Galilee, and Livias (Iulias), with 14 villages near it, in Peraea. It was before Agrippa and Berenice that, according to the New Testament, Paul the Apostle pleaded his case at Caesarea Maritima, probably in 59 or 60 (Acts 26). He told the Apostle Paul (in Acts 26) "almost thou persuade me to be a Christian...."

Agrippa expended large sums in beautifying Jerusalem and other cities, especially Berytus (ancient Beirut), a Hellenised city in Phoenicia. His partiality for the latter rendered him unpopular amongst his own subjects, and the capricious manner in which he appointed and deposed the high priests made him disliked by the Jews. He also renamed Paneas in honor of Nero.

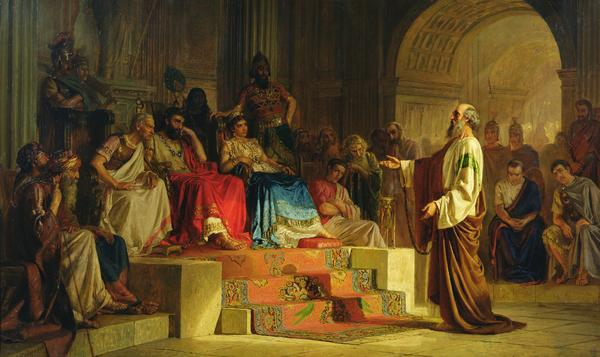
Nikolai Bodarevsky, 1875, Apostle Paul on Trial. Agrippa and Berenice are both seated on thrones.

== Jewish–Roman War ==
In the 17th year of Agrippa's reign (corresponding with the 12th year of Nero's reign, or 65/66 AD), Agrippa tried desperately to avert a war with Rome, when he saw his countrymen generally disposed to fight against Rome because of insults and abuses they had been facing under the Roman procurator, Gessius Florus. At this time, they had broken off the cloisters leading from Antonia Fortress to the Temple Mount where Roman soldiers went to keep guard during the Jewish holidays, and they refused to pay the due tribute to Rome. Agrippa convened the people and urged them to tolerate the temporary injustices done to them and submit themselves to Roman hegemony. At length, Agrippa failed to prevent his subjects from rebelling, whereas, during a certain holiday when the Roman governor of Syria, Cestius Gallus, had passed through Judea to quell the rebellion, he was routed by Jewish forces. By 66 the citizenry of Jerusalem expelled Agrippa and Berenice from Jerusalem.

During the First Jewish–Roman War of 66–73, he sent 2,000 men, archers and cavalry, to support Roman general Vespasian, showing that, although a Jew, he was entirely devoted to the Roman Empire. He accompanied Vespasian's son Titus on part of his campaigns against the rebels and was wounded at the siege of Gamla. After the capture of Jerusalem, he went with Berenice to Rome, where he was invested with the dignity of praetor and rewarded with additional territory.

=== Relations with Josephus ===
Agrippa had a great intimacy with the historian Josephus, having supplied him with information for his history, Antiquities of the Jews. Josephus preserved two of the letters he received from him.

== Death ==
According to the patriarch Photius I of Constantinople, Agrippa died childless at age 70, in the third year of the reign of Trajan, that is, 100, but statements of Josephus, in addition to the contemporary epigraphy from his kingdom, cast this date into serious doubt. The modern scholarly consensus holds that he died before 93/94. He was the last ruler from the House of Herod.

== Ancestry ==
Ancestors of Herod Agrippa II

8. Herod the Great
4. Aristobulus IV
9. Mariamne the Hasmonean
2. Herod Agrippa I
10. Costobarus
5. Berenice
11. Salome I
1. Herod Agrippa II
12. Phasael
6. Phasael II
3. Cypros
14. Herod the Great (= 8)
7. Salampsio
15. Mariamne the Hasmonean (= 9)

== Family tree ==
Alexander; HASMONEAN DYNASTY	Alexandra
4.Malthace	Herod the Great; HERODIAN DYNASTY	2.Mariamne I d. 29 BC
Aristobulus d. 7 BC	Berenice I
Herod Archelaus	Mariamne III	Herod V	Herodias	Herod Agrippa I	Aristobulus Minor
Herod Agrippa II	Berenice II	Mariamne VI	Drusilla
Berenice III

== See also ==
- Herodian kingdom
- List of Hasmonean and Herodian rulers

== Notes ==
Herod Agrippa II House of Herod
Preceded by Herod of Chalcis	Tetrarch of Chalcis; 48–53	Vacant Title next held by Aristobulus of Chalcis
Vacant Title last held by Herod Agrippa	King of Batanaea; 53–100	Title extinct
