= Roman Palestine =

Southern Levant during the rule of Ancient Rome (63 BCE - 324 CE)

- 63 BCE – 324 CE
| Hellenistic Palestine | Byzantine Palestine |
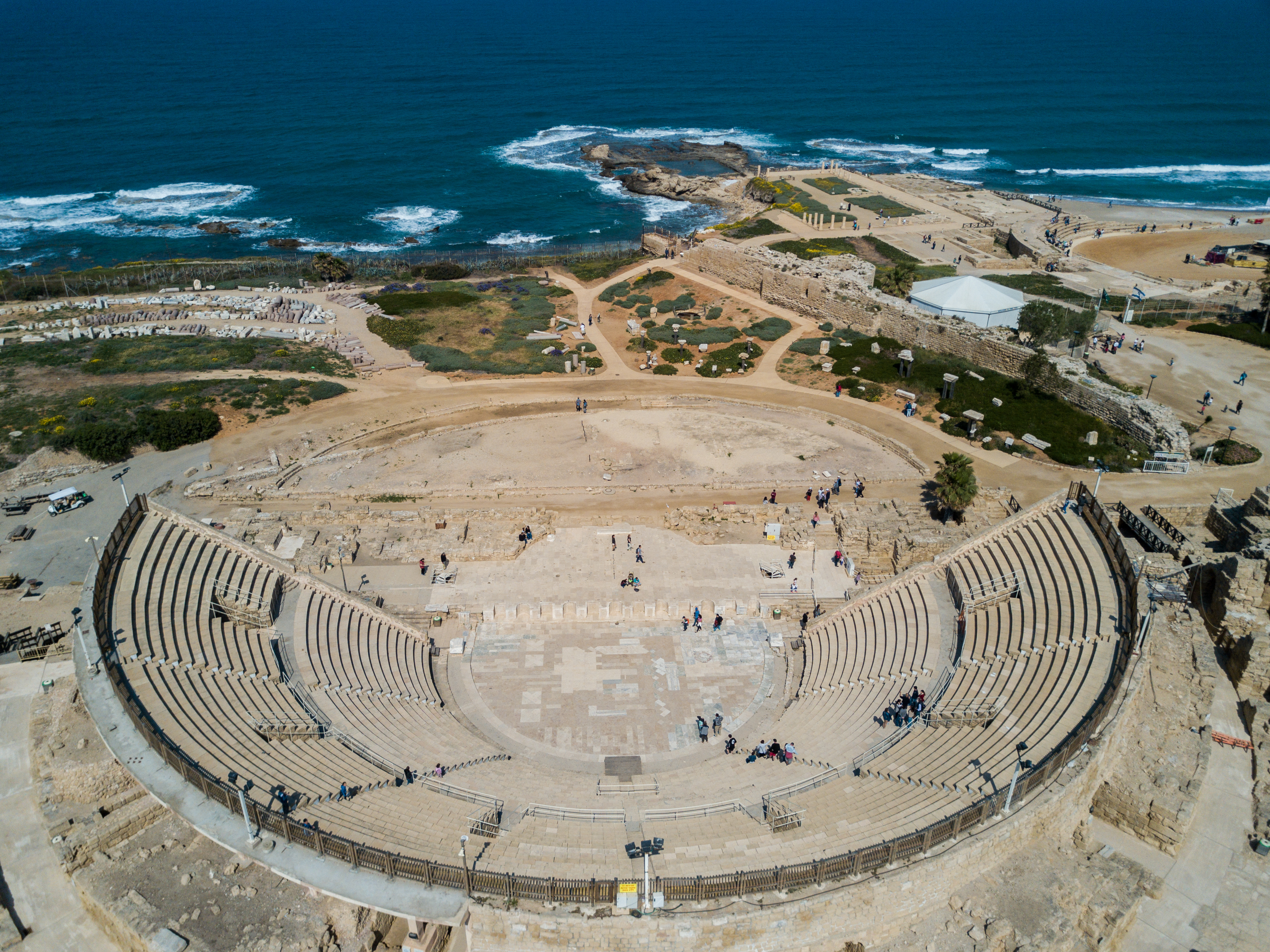
- Herod's theater in Caesarea Maritima
- Duration: c. 4 centuries
- Location: Southern Levant
- Including: Herodian kingdom; Herodian tetrarchy; Judaea; Syria Palaestina
- Key events: Siege of Jerusalem (63 BCE); Crucifixion of Jesus (30s CE); Jewish–Roman wars (66–135)

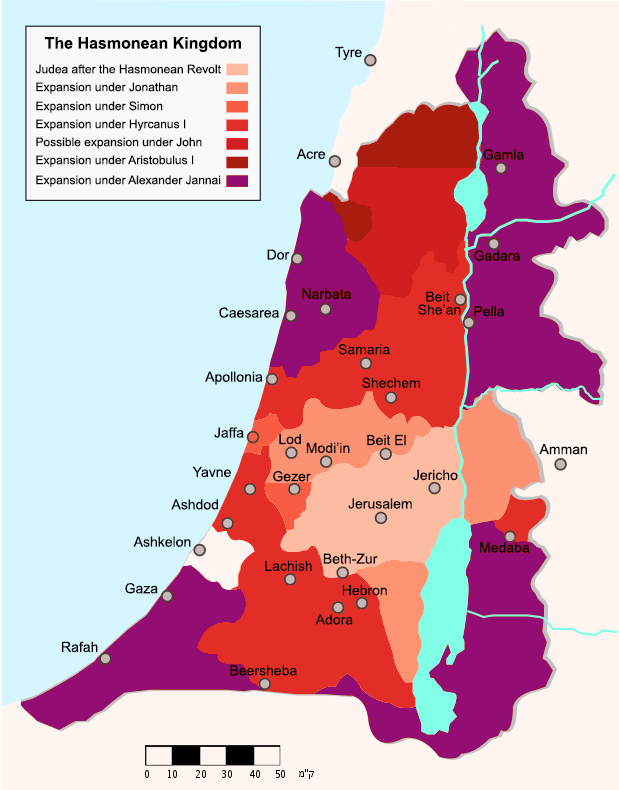
Hasmonean Judea, a Roman dominion after 63 BCE

Herodian kingdom of Judea (37-4 BCE) at its greatest extent

Herodian Tetrarchy Territory under Herod Archelaus Territory under Herod Antipas Territory under Philip Territory under Salome I

The province of Judaea within the Roman Empire in 125 CE

Roman Palestine is the term used by historians for the region of Palestine during the period in its history when it stood, to varying degrees, under the rule of the Roman Republic and the Roman Empire. Historians typically trace the period from the Roman intervention in the Hasmonean civil war in 63 BCE (uncontested), up until the transition from the pagan Roman to the Christian Byzantine Empire with the consolidation of Constantine's rule in 324 CE, but this end date varies from author to author. The Roman period can be subdivided into early and late phases, transitioning at either the First Jewish–Roman War c. 70 CE or the Bar Kokhba Revolt c. 135 CE. Some add a Middle Roman period to the Early and Late subsets.

During the Roman period, Palestine went through a series of administrative changes, beginning as a succession of Roman client states initially centered on Jerusalem and Judea, under the Jewish dynasty of the Hasmoneans, followed by the Herodians, before being gradually annexed into the Roman Empire as the fully incorporated Roman province of Judaea. Its peripheral areas incorporated parts of the Nabataean Kingdom, which underwent a similar evolution from client state to Roman province, Arabia Petraea (est. in 106). After 135 CE, Roman Palestine was re-organised into the Roman province of Syria Palaestina, which received in c. 300 CE, during the reforms of Diocletian, additional territories formerly part of Arabia Petraea: the Negev, Sinai, and southern Transjordan. About six decades later, already during the next, Byzantine period, the province was split in two, the northern part being named Palaestina Prima and the southern yet later becoming part of a wider Palaestina Tertia.

== Known governors of Judaea and Syria Palaestina ==
The governors of the Roman provinces in the Palestine region had a large amount of administrative power, however, they and the province they led were - to degrees varying with time - under the authority of the Roman legatus (legate) who governed over Syria from Antioch (see Roman Syria and Coele Syria (Roman province) for the province under their direct administration).

During the early imperial period (from 6 CE), Judaea was governed locally by equestrian (Note: "Equestrian" refers to members of the Roman equestrian order (ordo equester), a social rank below the senatorial order.) prefects (Note: A prefect (Latin praefectus) was an appointed official; the earliest governors of Judaea after 6 CE are commonly described as equestrian prefects.) (later also styled procurators (Note: A procurator (Latin procurator) was an imperial administrative official; the title usage for Judaea's governors varies over time in the evidence and in modern scholarship.)), but remained under the authority of the consular governor (Note: "Consular" indicates the governor's rank (a senator who had been consul). Roman Syria was normally governed by a consular imperial legate.) of Roman Syria, whose seat was at Antioch. After the First Jewish-Roman War, the arrangement changed: from 70 CE Judaea was a praetorian (Note: "Praetorian" here means "of praetorian rank" (linked to the Roman office of praetor): a senatorial rank above equestrian governors but below consular governors.) province governed by a legatus Augusti pro praetore, (Note: Legatus Augusti pro praetore was the emperor's senatorial governor of a province; in Judaea after 70 CE this governor also held military command.) who also commanded the legion stationed in the province (Legio X Fretensis).

=== Province of Judaea ===
For the time period between the first dissolution of the Herodian client statelets into the empire during Herod's immediate successors, to the change of name for the province from Judaea to Palaestina after the Bar Kokhba Revolt, see Roman administration of Judaea (AD 6–135).

=== Province of Syria Palaestina ===
- Aufidius Priscus (293/305)
- Aelius Flavianus (303)
- Urbanus (304–307)
- Valerius Firmilianus (308/9–310/11)
- Valentinianus (310/311)

== Economy ==
The study of the ancient economy is based on a mixture of the archaeological and historical (including epigraphic) records. For the Roman period, these typically focus on the activities and lives of the rich. The Talmud offers perspectives on rural life in Roman Palestine. The historian Daniel Sperber suggested that the region's economy declined during the Crisis of the Third Century.

The economy of Roman Palestine was based primarily on agriculture, with cereals, olives, wine and other crops forming the basis of rural life. Livestock, fishing, craft production, and local trade also contributed significantly to the provincial economy. Archaeological evidence shows that agriculture was supported by extensive networks of villages, agricultural areas, and regional markets, while cities and ports connected Palestine to wider trade networks around the Mediterranean.

Palestine's location between Egypt and Syria made it an important area for trade within the Roman Empire. The economy was influenced by Roman taxation, imperial administration, and Roman infrastructure such as roads and ports. Modern studies reconstruct the economy through archaeological remains, inscriptions, and literary sources like rabbinic texts, although the surviving evidence is inconsistent.

== See also ==
- Byzantine Palestine, the region during the following period
- Timeline of the Palestine region: Byzantine period
- Early Christianity
- Hellenistic Palestine
- Herodian tetrarchy, Herod the Great's kingdom under his immediate successors
- History of the Jews in the Roman Empire
- Mishnah, first written collection of Jewish oral traditions
