= Berenice (daughter of Salome) =

Biblical figure

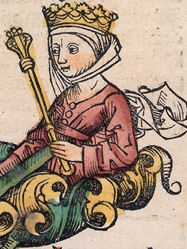
Berenice (daughter of Salome)

Berenice was the daughter of Costobarus and Salome I, the sister of Herod the Great.

== First marriage ==
She married her cousin Aristobulus in order to reduce discord within her family caused by Herod's favoritism towards his wife Mariamne I. Her marriage was an attempt to unite the two main sides of her family previously split by marriage and alleviate the tension surrounding which side would be responsible to succeeding Herod. This did not solve the problems present among the heirs, and eventually Aristobulus was executed by his father in 6 BCE, and Berenice was accused of complicity in his death.

== Children ==
By Aristobulus, Berenice was the mother of Herod Agrippa I, Herod of Chalcis, Herodias, Mariamne III and Aristobulus Minor.

== Ties to the Roman imperial family ==
Berenice maintained her elite status in Judea through her family's close ties with the Roman imperial family. This tie allowed for her son Agrippa to be raised in Rome with the family of Antonia Minor, some of Rome's future leaders.

== Second marriage ==
She eventually remarried to a man named, Theudion (brother of Herod I's first wife Doris, and thus uncle of Antipater), in order to strengthen her family's political ties. There is little known about Berenice once Herod the Great dies, but it can be assumed that her arranged marriage did not survive the death of her uncle.

== Family tree ==
Costobarus	Salome I
Aristobulus d. 7 BC	Berenice (daughter of Salome)
Mariamne III	Herod V	Herodias	Herod Agrippa I	Aristobulus Minor
Herod Agrippa II	Berenice	Mariamne	Drusilla
