= Olympias (Herodian) =

Daughter of Herod the Great

Olympias the Herodian (Ancient Greek: Ολυμπιάδα, romanized: Olumpiáda) was the daughter of Herod the Great and wife Malthace, a Samaritan. This was Herod's fourth marriage. Olympias' better known brothers were Herod Archelaus and Herod Antipas. She married Herod's nephew Joseph ben Joseph and bore him a daughter, Mariamne, who was the first wife of Herod of Chalcis and the mother of Aristobulus of Chalcis.
