= Marcus Julius Agrippa =

Marcus Julius Agrippa is the name of two romanized client kings of Judea in the 1st century:

- Agrippa I (Herod Agrippa, ruled 41–44) and his son
- Agrippa II (ruled 48–100)
