= Kingdom of Judaea =

Kingdom of Judaea (or Kingdom of Judea) can refer to

- The kingdom of the Hasmonean dynasty
- Its successor, a vassal state of the Roman Empire ruled by the Herodian dynasty, later the Roman province Judaea

== See also ==
- Kingdom of Judah
