= Herodias =

1st century AD Herodian Dynasty princess

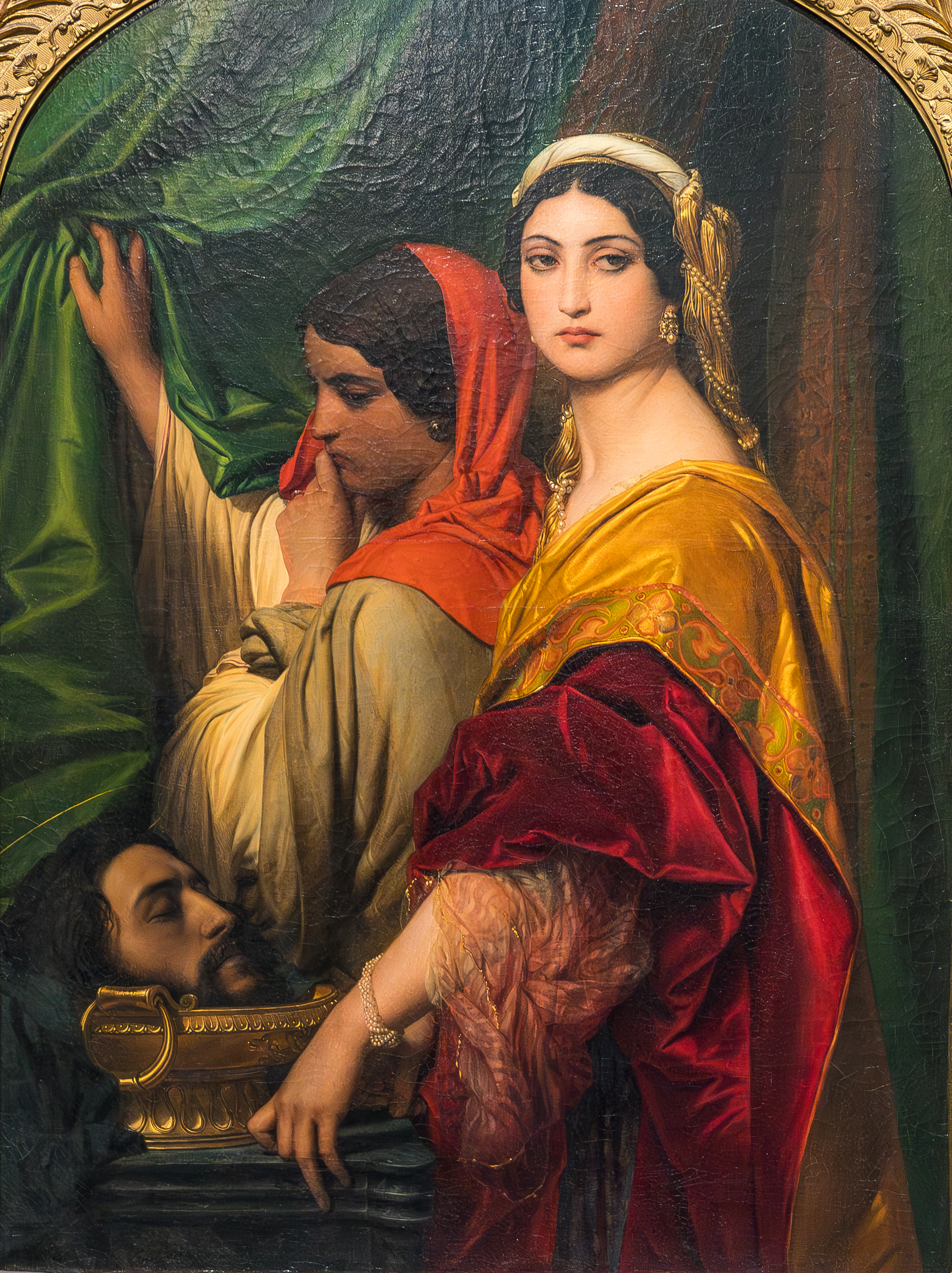
- Herodias, by Paul Delaroche, depicting the princess (right) with John's head
- Born: First Century BC
- Died: after AD 39
- Spouse: Herod II; Herod Antipas
- Issue: Salome
- Dynasty: Herodian dynasty
- Father: Aristobulus IV
- Mother: Berenice

Herodias (/həˈroʊdiəs/; Ancient Greek: Ἡρῳδιάς, romanized: Hērōidiás; c. 15 BC – after AD 39) was a princess of the Herodian dynasty of Judaea during the time of the Roman Empire. Christian writings connect her with the execution of John the Baptist.

The daughter of Aristobulus IV and his wife Berenice, Herodias was a full sister to Herod V (king of Chalkis), Herod Agrippa (king of Judea), Aristobulus Minor, and Mariamne III (wife of Crown Prince Antipater). Following Antipater's execution by Herod the Great, she was possibly the first wife of Herod Archelaus, principal heir of Herod the Great and ethnarch of Judea.

== Marriages ==
=== Herod II ===
Herod the Great executed his sons Alexander and Aristobulus IV in 7 BC, and engaged Herodias to Herod II (born ca. 27 BC; died AD 33), her half-uncle. The marriage was opposed by Antipater II, Herod the Great's eldest son. Antipater's execution in 4 BC for plotting to poison his father left Herod II as first in line. However, when Herod the Great discovered that his wife Mariamne knew about the poison plot but did not try to stop it, he divorced her and dropped her son Herod II from the line of succession, just days before he died.

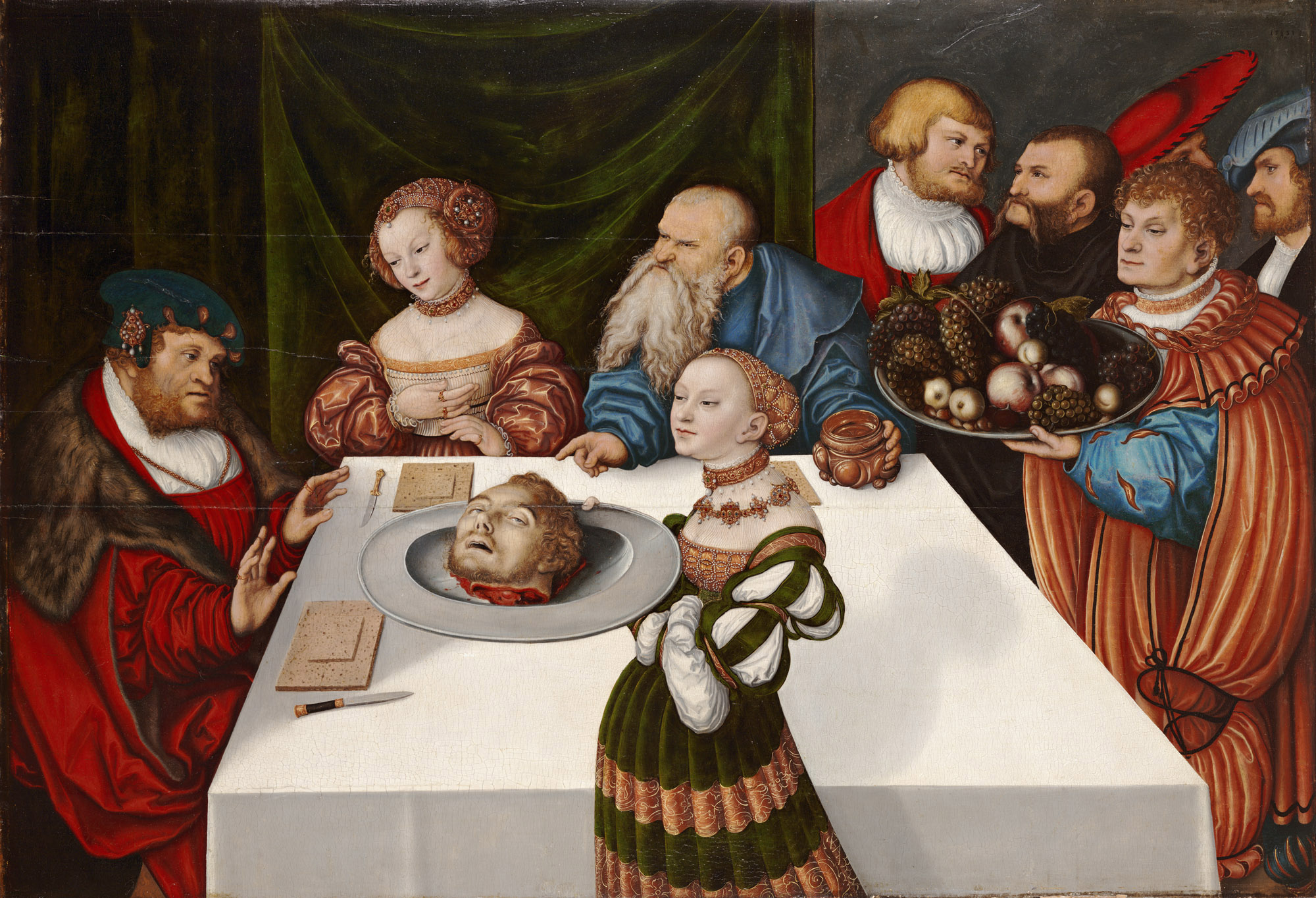
Feast of Herod, Lucas Cranach the Elder, 1531

Both the Gospel of Matthew and Gospel of Mark state that Herodias was married to Philip, therefore some scholars have argued his name was "Herod Philip" (not to be confused with Philip the Tetrarch, whom some writers call Herod Philip II, Josephus's account says Herodias married Herod, the grandson of Simon Boethus and that Salome married Phillip. This Herod was only named Herod in the text).

Many scholars dispute this, however, and believe it was an error, a theory supported by the fact that the Gospel of Luke drops the name Philip. Because he was the grandson of the high priest Simon Boethus he is sometimes described as Herod Boethus, but there is no evidence he was called by that name.

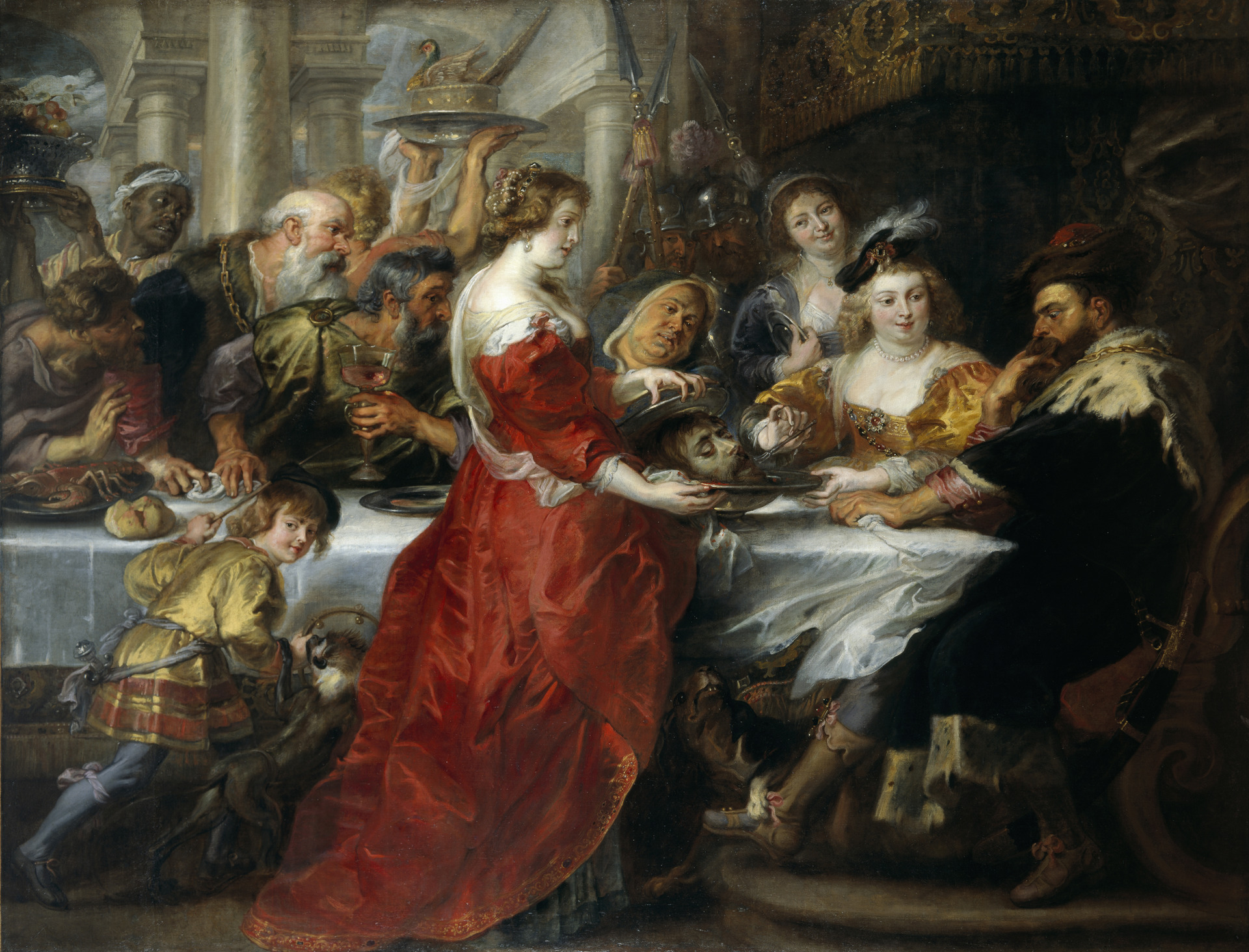
Feast of Herod, Peter Paul Rubens

There was one daughter from this marriage, Salome. Herodias later divorced Herod II, although it is unclear when they were divorced. According to the historian Josephus:

Herodias took upon her to confound the laws of our country, and divorced herself from her husband while he was alive, and was married to Herod Antipas

=== Herod Antipas ===
Herodias' second husband was Herod Antipas (born before 20 BC; died after 39 AD) half-brother of Herod II (her first husband). He is best known today for his role in events that led to the executions of John the Baptist and Jesus of Nazareth.

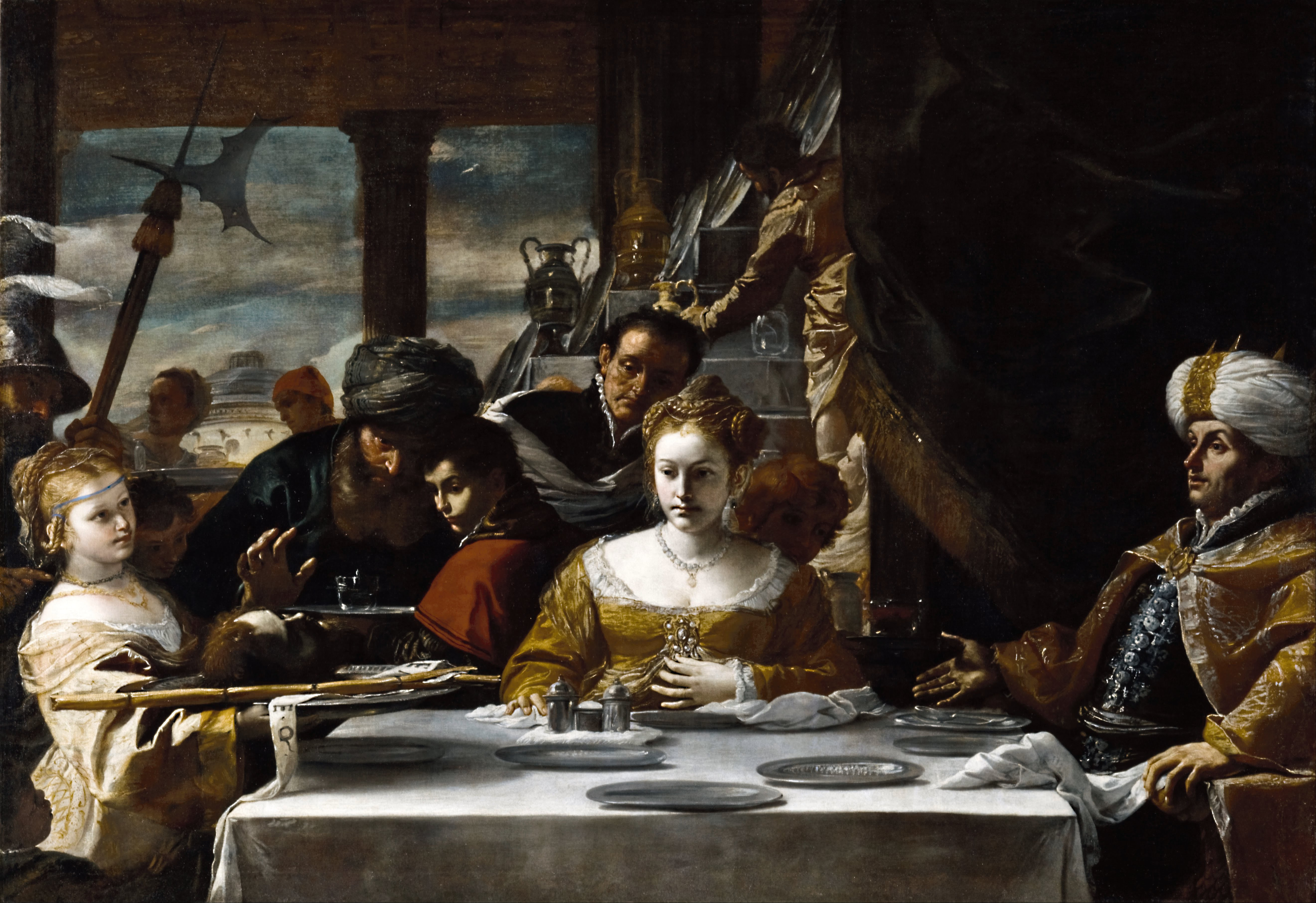
Feast of Herod, Mattia Preti, c. 1660

Antipas divorced his first wife Phasaelis, the daughter of King Aretas IV of Nabatea, in favor of Herodias. According to biblical scholars, the Gospel of Matthew and the Gospel of Luke, it was this proposed marriage which John the Baptist publicly criticized. Aside from provoking his conflict with the Baptist, the tetrarch's divorce added a personal grievance to previous disputes with Aretas over territory on the border of Perea and Nabatea. Aretas sent an army to punish Antipas, and was joined in this endeavor by auxiliary troops from the province of Syria. Josephus calls these troops 'fugitives', while Moses of Chorene says they were the army of King Abgarus V of Edessa, under the command of commander Khosran Ardzrouni.

The result of this war proved disastrous for Antipas; a Roman counter-offensive was ordered by Tiberius, but abandoned upon that emperor's death in 37 AD. In 39 AD Antipas was accused by his nephew/brother-in-law Agrippa I of conspiracy against the new Roman emperor Caligula, who sent him into exile in Gaul. Accompanied there by Herodias, he died at an unknown date. It is uncertain if Herodias had any children by her second husband, Herod Antipas.

== In the Gospels ==
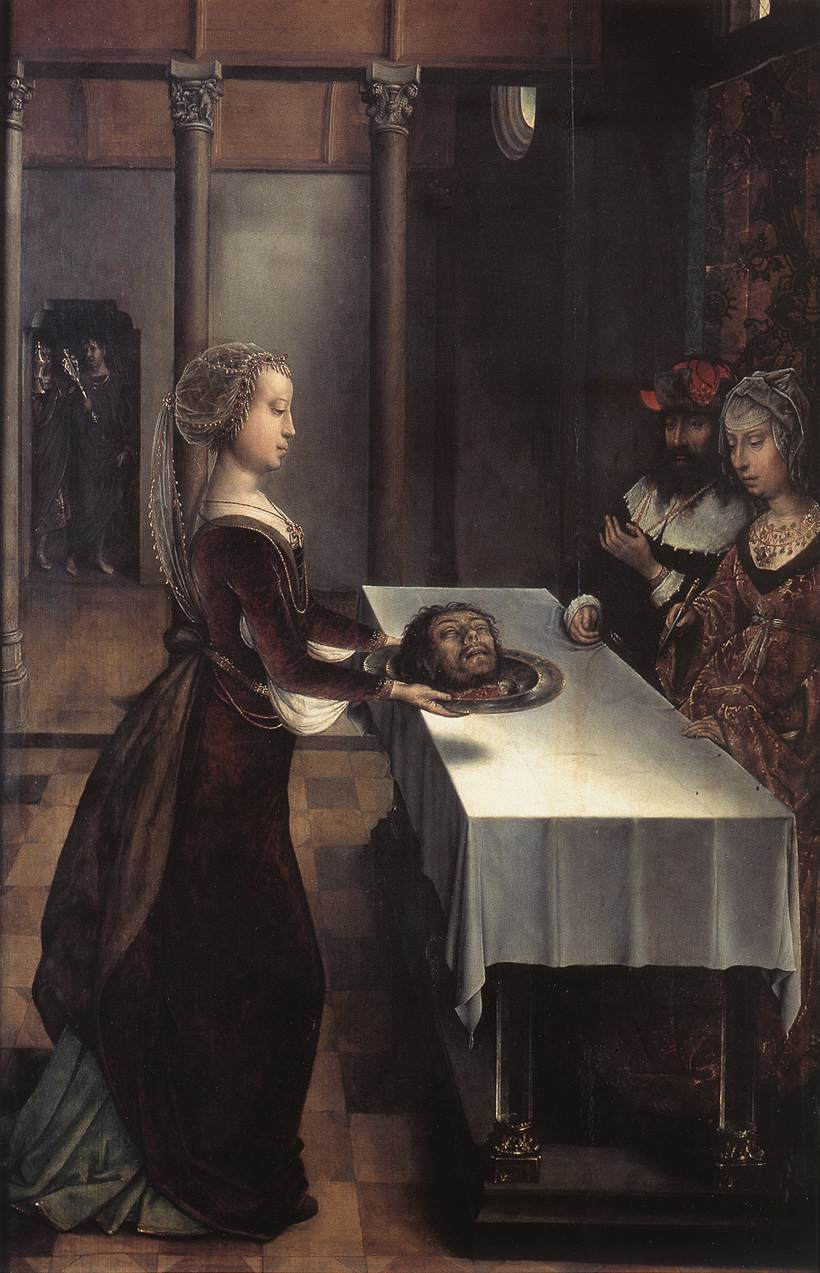
Salome delivers the head of John the Baptist, Juan de Flandes, 1496

In the Gospels of Matthew and Mark, Herodias plays a major role in the execution of John the Baptist, using her daughter's dance before Antipas and his party guests to ask for the head of the Baptist as a reward. According to the Gospel of Mark, Antipas did not want to put John the Baptist to death, for Antipas liked to listen to John the Baptist preach (Mark 6:20). Furthermore, Antipas may have feared that if John the Baptist were to be put to death, his followers would riot. The Gospel of Luke amplifies the role of Herod by omitting these details.

=== Modern scholarship ===
Some biblical scholars have questioned whether the Gospels give historically accurate accounts of John the Baptist's execution. Some exegetes believe that Antipas' struggle with John the Baptist as told in the Gospels was some kind of a remembrance of the political and religious fight opposing the Israelite monarchs Ahab and Jezebel to the prophet Elijah.

== In medieval Europe ==
In medieval Europe, Herodias, or just her name, became associated with beliefs about witches, in particular their supernatural leader they would join at night to ride with or visit in a "play" or other gathering. Thus she became synonymous with figures who performed the same function, such as Diana, Holda, and Abundia.

Schematic family tree showing the Herods of the Bible

== In art and fiction ==
Together with Salome, Herodias was a frequent subject in depictions of the Power of Women topos in the later Medieval and Renaissance periods. The most common moment shown including Herodias is the Feast of Herod, showing Salome presenting John's severed head on a platter as Herodias dines with her husband and others.

=== Stories, plays ===
- "Hérodiade," poetic scene by Stéphane Mallarmé, c. 1864.
- Hérodias, story by Gustave Flaubert, one of the Three Tales (Trois contes), published in 1877.
- Salomé, play by Oscar Wilde, French (1894), translated into English by Lord Alfred Douglas, 1895.
- Salome: The Wandering Jewess. My First 2,000 Years of Love, by George Sylvester Viereck, 1930.

=== Music ===
- Hérodiade, opera by Jules Massenet, based on the story by Gustave Flaubert.
- Salome, opera by Richard Strauss, based on a German translation (by Hedwig Lachmann, grandmother of Mike Nichols) of the play by Oscar Wilde.
- Salomé, an opera by French composer Antoine Mariotte, set to a French libretto based on Oscar Wilde's play.
- In Parsifal, the opera by Richard Wagner, the lead female character of Kundry is revealed to be Herodias, in the second act. In the opera she was said to have laughed at Christ when she saw him being crucified and was cursed with immortality. She eventually finds redemption through the actions of Parsifal.
- "Salome", a song by Irish rock band U2.
- San Giovanni Battista, oratorio by Alessandro Stradella.

=== Other ===
- Hérodiade, ballet by Paul Hindemith.
- Hérodiade, oil painting by Aimé Morot.
- Herodias, oil painting by Jean-Jacques Henner

== In film ==
- In the American film, Salome (1953 film), Herodias was played by Judith Anderson.
- In the American film The Greatest Story Ever Told, Herodias was played by Marian Seldes.
- In Ken Russell's Salome's Last Dance, which takes place at a performance of Oscar Wilde's play, the role of Herodias is portrayed by Glenda Jackson.
- In the Jesus of Nazareth (miniseries), Herodias was played by Valentina Cortese.

== See also ==
- List of biblical figures identified in extra-biblical sources
