= Cleopatra (given name) =

Depiction of Cleopatra VII by John William Waterhouse

Cleopatra is a feminine given name. It was the name of various characters in Greek Mythology and was frequently used among Royal dynasties in the Hellenistic period. It may refer to:

== People ==
=== Ancient world ===
==== Queens of Ancient Egypt ====
- Cleopatra I Syra (c. 204–176 BC), princess of the Seleucid Empire by birth, and queen of Egypt by marriage
- Cleopatra II of Egypt (c. 185–116 BC), queen (and briefly sole ruler) of Egypt
- Cleopatra III of Egypt (169–101 BC), queen of Egypt
- Cleopatra IV of Egypt (c. 138–135 BC), queen of Egypt
- Berenice III of Egypt (120-80 BC), queen of Egypt, also known as Cleopatra and Cleopatra Berenice
- Cleopatra V of Egypt (died c. 69/68 BC or c. 57 BC), queen of Egypt
- Cleopatra VI of Egypt (died c. 57 BC), queen of Egypt (possibly Cleopatra V)
- Cleopatra VII Philopator, also known mononymously as Cleopatra (69–30 BC), last active ruler of the Ptolemaic Kingdom of Egypt

==== Other ====
- Cleopatra Eurydice of Macedon (4th century BC), wife of Philip II of Macedon
- Cleopatra of Macedon (c. 356–308 BC), queen of Epirus, sister of Alexander the Great, daughter of Philip II of Macedon and Olympias of Epirus
- Cleopatra Tryphaena (c. 141 BC – 111 BC), queen of the Seleucid Empire and first wife of Antiochus VIII Grypus
- Cleopatra Thea (c. 164–121 BC), daughter of Cleopatra II and Ptolemy VI Philometor
- Cleopatra Selene of Syria (c. between 135 and 130 – 69 BC), daughter of Cleopatra III and Ptolemy VIII Physcon
- Cleopatra of Pontus (110–after 58 BC), wife of Tigranes the Great
- Cleopatra of Jerusalem (1st century BC), wife of Herod the Great
- Cleopatra Selene II (40–5 BC), daughter of Cleopatra VII and Mark Antony
- Cleopatra the Physician (1st century AD), Greek physician and author
- Saint Cleopatra (3rd and 4th century AD, d. 319 or 327), Christian saint
- Cleopatra the Alchemist (3rd or 4th century AD), Greek alchemist, author and philosopher
- Cleopatra, daughter of Emperor Maurice and Constantina, executed by Phocas around 605 along with her mother and sisters

=== Modern world ===
- Cleopatra, Hereditary Princess of Oettingen-Spielberg (born 1987), German-Chilean actress, model, and aristocrat
- Cleopatra Borel (born 1979), female shot putter from Trinidad and Tobago
- Cleopatra Broumand (born 1944/1945), Iranian-born American fashion designer and entrepreneur
- Cleopatra Coleman (born 1987), Australian actress
- Cleo Demetriou (born 2001), Cyprus-born actress
- Cleopatra Higgins (born 1982), British singer
- Cleopatra Koheirwe (born 1982), Ugandan actress, writer, singer and personality
- Cleopatra Mathis (born 1947), American poet and professor
- Cleopatra Pantazi (born 1963), Greek singer
- Cleopatra Stratan (born 2002), Moldovan singer
- Cleopatra Tawo (died 2017), Nigerian radio personality
- Cleopatra Tucker (born 1943), American politician

== Fictional characters ==
- the protagonist of the blaxploitation films Cleopatra Jones (1973) and Cleopatra Jones and the Casino of Gold (1975)
- Cleopatra Wong, the protagonist of three films: They Call Her Cleopatra Wong (1978), Dynamite Johnson (1979) and Devil's Angels (1980)
- Cleopatra (Rome character), in the historical drama series Rome
- Cleopatra Smith, in the animated sitcom Clone High
- Cleopatra, the protagonist of the television series Cleopatra 2525, which aired from 2000 to 2001
- Cleopatra Funnie, in the animated television series Doug
- Cleopatra Corns, the protagonist of the manga series Cleopatra DC
- Cleopatra, important poet and lawmaker in the future world of Robert Graves' Seven Days in New Crete
