= Herodian tetrarchy =

Division of Herod the Great's kingdom

- Tetrarchy of the Roman Empire
- 4 BC–44 AD
- Territory under Herod Archelaus Territory under Herod Antipas Territory under Philip Territory under Salome I Syria Province
- Capital: Jerusalem (Herod Archelaus); Sepphoris later Tiberias (Herod Antipas); Caesarea Philippi (Philip); Jamnia (Salome I)
- Government
- King, Ethnarch, Tetrarch, Toparch
  - 4 BCE–6 CE: Herod Archelaus (as Ethnarch)
  - 4 BCE–39 CE: Herod Antipas (as Tetrarch)
  - 4 BCE–34 CE: Philip (as Tetrarch)
  - 4 BCE–10 CE: Salome I (as Toparch)
  - 37 CE–44 CE: Herod Agrippa I (as King)
- Historical era: Second Temple period
  - Death of Herod the Great: 4 BC
  - Herod Archelaus exiled, Judea, Samaria, and Idumea annexed as a province Judaea: 6 CE
  - Herod Antipas exiled, Galilee and Perea transferred to Herod Agrippa I's dominions: 39 CE
  - Territory of a province Judaea transferred to Herod Agrippa I's dominions: 41 CE
  - Death of Herod Agrippa I, his dominions annexed as a province Judaea: 44 AD
Preceded by	Succeeded by
Herodian kingdom	Judaea (Roman province); Kingdom of Chalcis

The Herodian tetrarchy was a regional division of a client state of Rome, formed following the death of Herod the Great in 4 BCE. The client kingdom was divided between Herod's sister Salome I and his sons Herod Archelaus, Herod Antipas, and Philip. Upon the deposition of Herod Archelaus in 6 CE, his territories were transformed into a Roman province. With the death of Salome I in 10 CE, her domain was also incorporated into a province.

Other parts of the Herodian tetrarchy continued to function under Herodians. Philip ruled over territories north and east of the Jordan River until 34 CE. His domain was later incorporated into the Province of Syria. Herod Antipas ruled Galilee and Perea until 39 CE. The last notable Herodian ruler with some level of independence was King Herod Agrippa I. He was given the territory of Judea with its capital Jerusalem. With his death in 44 CE, the provincial status of Judea was restored for good.

Later Herodians, Herod of Chalcis, Aristobulus of Chalcis and Agrippa II, reigned over territories outside of Judea with the title of king but as Roman clients. The last of them, Agrippa II, died childless in c. 100 CE and thus all territories previously ruled by members of the Herodian dynasty were incorporated into the province of Syria.

== Name ==
The word tetrarch suggests four rulers ("ruler of a quarter"); however Josephus, in the context of describing Herod's legacy, only mentions three. He refers to Archelaus, who had "one half of that which had been subject to Herod", and for Philip and Antipas "the other half, divided into two parts". On the other hand, Luke the Evangelist refers to Lysanias, tetrarch of Abilene, in his list of rulers at the time of John the Baptist, alongside Pontius Pilate (one of a series of Roman governors who replaced Archelaus), Herod (Antipas), and Philip. Josephus' reference to one half the kingdom may signify that Archelaus was ruler of two quarters. This would suggest that division into quarters was already established, and that Lysanias' quarter was part of a different tetrarchy in Syria; this is credible, as Herod III, brother of Herod Agrippa I, was king of Chalcis, which was to the north, outside Herod's kingdom. Or it may be that Josephus, in describing the inheritances of Herod's sons, omitted to mention Lysanias, or his predecessor, as they were not Herodians. The reference to "one half of the kingdom" could then be understood as a geographical, rather than a political observation; Archelaus' share of the kingdom covered about half the territory, and more than half the revenue, owned by Herod. It is the view of W. Smith, referring to Abilene, that Abilene, or part of it, was subject to Herod before his death, and held by Lysanias as a tetrarchate from him. The territory was returned later to the Herodians, the first part by Caligula to Herod Agrippa I, the remainder by Claudius to Herod Agrippa II.

== History ==
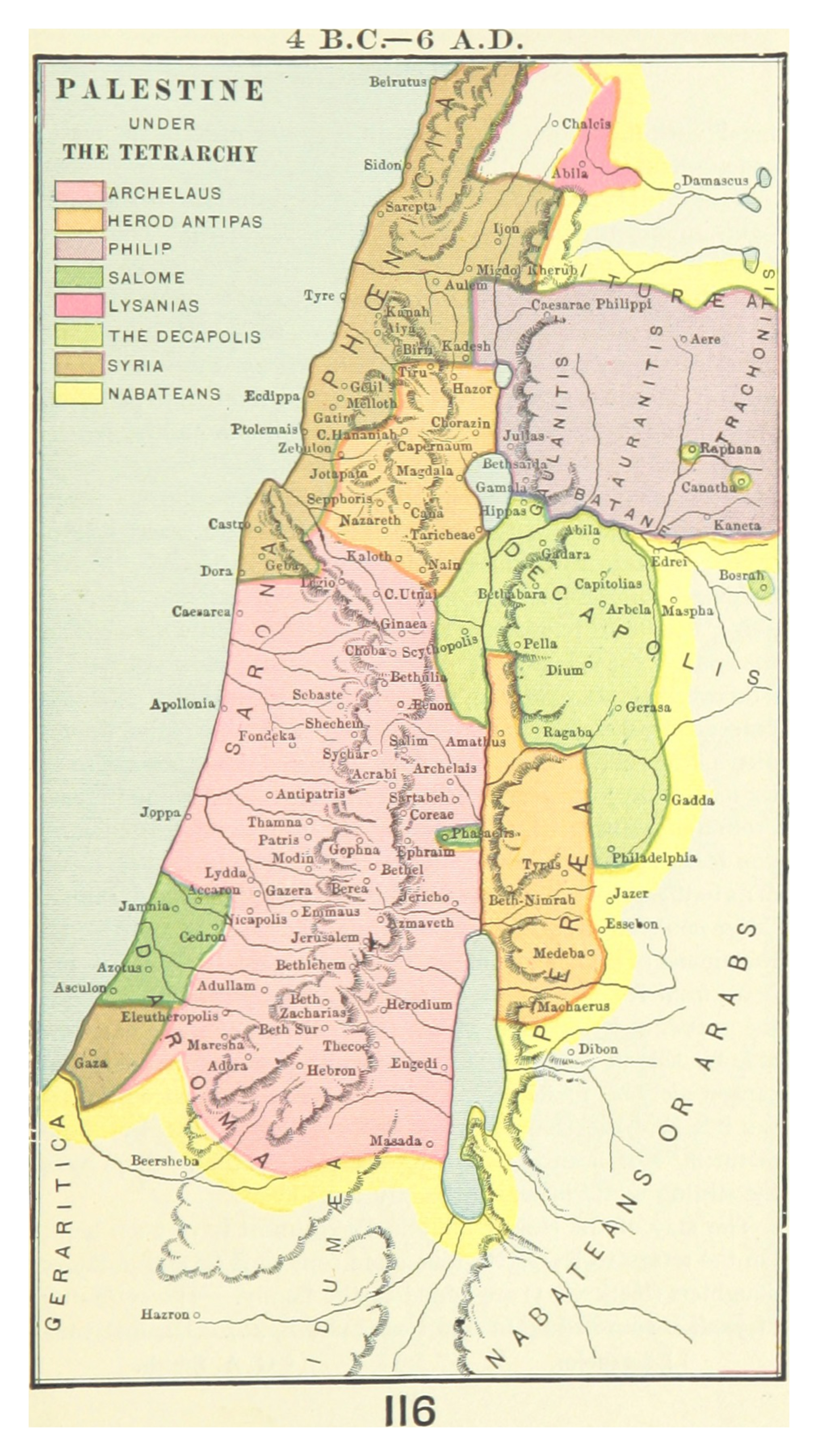
Detailed map of the tetrarchy

At the time of his death, Herod ruled over most of the South Western Levant, as a client-state of the Roman Empire. Antipas was not Herod's first choice of heir. That honor fell to Aristobulus and Alexander, Herod's sons by the Hasmonean princess Mariamne. It was only after they were executed (c. 7 BCE), and Herod's oldest son Antipater was convicted of trying to poison his father (5 BCE), that the now elderly Herod fell back on his youngest son Antipas, revising his will to make him heir. During his fatal illness in 4 BCE, Herod had yet another change of heart about the succession. According to the final version of his will, Antipas' elder brother Archelaus was now to become king of Judea, Idumea and Samaria, while Antipas would rule Galilee and Perea with the lesser function of tetrarch. Philip was to receive Gaulanitis (the Golan Heights), Batanaea (southern Syria), Trachonitis and Auranitis (Hauran).

Because of Judea's status as a Roman client kingdom, Herod's plans for the succession had to be ratified by Augustus. The three heirs of Herod therefore traveled to Rome to make their claims, Antipas arguing he ought to inherit the whole kingdom and the others maintaining that Herod's final will ought to be honored. Despite qualified support for Antipas from Herodian family members in Rome, who favored direct Roman rule of Judea but considered Antipas preferable to his brother, Augustus largely confirmed the division of territory set out by Herod in his final will. Archelaus had, however, to be content with the title of ethnarch rather than king.

Eventually, after arrangements had been made, the kingdom was divided between three of Herod's sons:

- Herod Archelaus, his son by his fourth wife Malthace the Samaritan, received the lion's share of the kingdom; Idumaea, Judea and Samaria, and the title of Ethnarch ("ruler of the people"; in this case, the Jews, Samaritans, and Idumeans).
- Herod Antipas, Archelaus’ brother, became Tetrarch of Galilee and Perea.
- Philip, Herod's son by his fifth wife Cleopatra of Jerusalem, became Tetrarch of the northern part of Herod's kingdom. The Gospel of Luke lists Philip's territories as Iturea and Trachonitis and Flavius Josephus lists as Gaulanitis, Trachonitis and Paneas as well as Batanea, Trachonitis, Auranitis, and "a certain part of what is called the House of Zenodorus". A number of these names refer to the same places, found now in modern-day Syria and Lebanon.

Herod's sister Salome I also received the title of queen of Jamnia, ruling Paralia and some areas in southern Perea. Upon her death in 10 CE, the domain was incorporated into Judea Province.

In a turbulent period of history, the rule of the tetrarchs was relatively uneventful. The most trouble fell to Archelaus, who was faced with sedition by the Pharisees at the beginning of his reign, and crushed it with great severity. After ruling for 10 years he was removed by the emperor Augustus in 6 CE, following complaints about his cruelty and his offences against the Mosaic law. He was replaced by a Roman prefect, and his territory re-organized as the Roman province of Iudaea.

Philip ruled Iturea, Trachonitis, Batanea, Gaulanitis, Auranitis and Paneas as a tetrarch until his death in 34 CE when his territories became briefly part of the Roman province of Syria, but in 37 CE were given to Herod Agrippa I with the title of king. Herod Agrippa I arranged for Chalcis to be handed over to his brother Herod and ruled himself in Philip's stead. After the banishment of Herod Antipas in 39 CE Herod Agrippa I became also ruler of Galilee and Perea, and in 41 CE, as a mark of favour by the emperor Claudius, succeeded the Roman prefect Marullus as King of Iudaea. With this acquisition, a Herodian Kingdom of the Jews was nominally re-established until his death in 44 CE though there is no indication that status as a province was suspended.

== See also ==
- Decapolis
- Herodian dynasty
- Timeline of the Second Temple period
