= Jean Magnon =

17th century French playwright

Jean Magnon (died 1662) was a French playwright.

== Selected works ==
- Le Gran Tamerlan et Bejezet (1648), on Tamerlane and Bayezid I
- Tite (1660), tragi-comedy on the life of Titus and his affair with Berenice
- Zénobie, Reyne de Palmire (1660), tragedy on the life of Zenobia
- Encyclopedia: La science universelle (1663)
