= Mariamne (1st century) =

Mariamne (fl. early 1st century CE) was the first wife of Herod of Chalcis, king of Chalcis in Asia Minor. Her parents were Olympias (Herodian) and Jesus, son of Fabus. Mariamne was a granddaughter of Herod the Great, through Olympias (Herodian) being the daughter of Malthace (the fourth wife of Herod the Great. She was the mother of Aristobulus.
