= Herodian dynasty =

Royal dynasty of Idumaean (Edomite) descent

House of Herod Hebrew: בית הורדוס
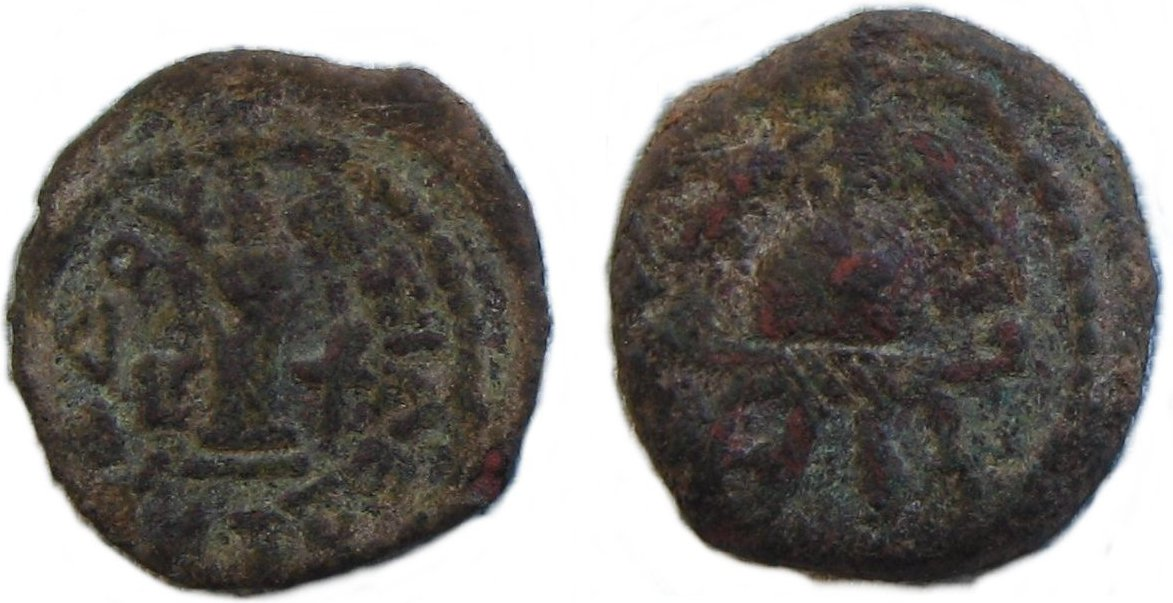
- Prutah of Herod the Great
- Country: Judaea Greater Armenia Lesser Armenia
- Founder: Antipater the Idumaean
- Titles: List: Ethnarch of Judaea; Tetrarch of the Galilee and Peraea; Tetrarch of Ituraea, Trachonitis, Gaulanitis Batanaea and Auranitis; Toparch of Jamnia; King of Greater Armenia; King of Lesser Armenia; King of Cetis

The Herodian dynasty was a royal dynasty of Idumaean (Edomite) descent, ruling the Herodian Kingdom of Judea and later the Herodian tetrarchy as a vassal state of the Roman Empire. The Herodian dynasty began with Herod the Great who assumed the throne of Judea, with Roman support, bringing down the century-old Hasmonean Kingdom. His kingdom lasted until his death in 4 BC, when it was divided among his sons and sister as a tetrarchy, which lasted for about 10 years. Most of those tetrarchies, including Judea proper, were incorporated into Judaea Province from 6 BC, though limited Herodian de facto kingship continued until Agrippa I's death in 44 AD and nominal title of kingship continued until c. 92 or 100 AD, when the last Herodian monarch, king Agrippa II, died and Rome assumed full power over his de jure domain.

== History ==
=== Origin ===
During the time of the Hasmonean ruler John Hyrcanus (134–104 BC), Judea conquered Edom (Idumea) and forced the Edomites to convert to Judaism. The Edomites were gradually integrated into the Judean nation, and some of them reached high-ranking positions. In the days of Alexander Jannaeus, the Edomite Antipas was appointed governor of Edom. His son Antipater was the chief adviser to Hyrcanus II and managed to establish a good relationship with the Roman Republic, who at that time (63 BC) extended their influence over the region, following conquest of Syria and intervention in a civil war in Judea.

There are differing genealogies for the dynasty, depending on the source. According to Sextus Julius Africanus, Antipater's father was named Herod, and Epiphanius of Salamis writes that this Herod's father was named Antipas. It is Josephus who states that Antipas fathered Antipater, without further delineating his ancestry. This model is usually accepted by scholars.

Julius Caesar appointed Antipater to be procurator of Judea in 47 BC, and Antipater appointed his sons Phasael and Herod to be governors of Jerusalem and Galilee respectively. Antipater was murdered in 43 BC; however, his sons managed to hold the reins of power and were elevated to the rank of tetrarchs in 41 BC by Mark Antony.

=== Rise to power and reign ===
==== Herodian Kingdom ====
In 40 BC, the Parthians invaded the eastern Roman provinces and managed to drive the Romans out of many areas. In Judea, the Hasmonean dynasty was restored under King Antigonus II Mattathias as a pro-Parthian monarch. Herod the Great, the son of Antipater and Cypros (possibly of Nabataean descent), managed to escape to Rome. After convincing the Roman Senate of his sincere intentions in favor of Romans he eventually was announced as king of the Jews by the Roman Senate.

Despite his announcement as king of the whole of Judea, Herod did not fully conquer it until 37 BC. He subsequently ruled the Herodian kingdom as a vassal king for 34 years, crushing the opposition while also initiating huge building projects, including the harbor at Caesarea Maritima, the plaza surrounded by retaining walls at the Temple Mount, the Masada and the Herodium, among other fortresses and public works. Herod ruled Judea until 4 BC; at his death, his kingdom was divided among his three sons and his sister as a tetrarchy.

==== Herodian Tetrarchy ====
Herod Archelaus, son of Herod and Malthace the Samaritan, was given the title of ethnarch and ruled over the main part of the kingdom: Judea proper, Idumea, and Samaria. He ruled for ten years until 6 AD, when he was "banished to Vienna in Gaul, where according to Cassius Dio, "Hist. Roma," lv. 27—he lived for the remainder of his days." See also Census of Quirinius.

Herod Antipas, another son of Herod and Malthace, was made a tetrarch of Galilee and Perea; he ruled there until he was exiled by emperor Caligula in 39 AD, according to Josephus. Herod Antipas is the person referenced in the New Testament, playing a role in the death of John the Baptist and the trial of Jesus. The Gospel of Luke states that Jesus was first brought before Pontius Pilate for trial, since Pilate was the governor of Roman Judea, which encompassed Jerusalem where Jesus was arrested. Pilate initially handed him over to Antipas, in whose territory Jesus had been most active, but Antipas sent him back to Pilate.

Philip was the son of Herod and his fifth wife Cleopatra of Jerusalem. He was given the title of tetrarch with jurisdiction over the northeast part of his father's kingdom: Iturea, Trachonitis, Batanaea, Gaulanitis, Auranitis, and Paneas. He ruled until his death in 34 AD.

Salome I, Herod's sister, was the toparch of Jabneh until her death c. 10 CE.

=== Last rulers ===
Herod Agrippa was the grandson of Herod. Thanks to his friendship with Caligula, the emperor appointed him ruler with the title of king over the territories of Philip in 37 AD, which were after Philip's death in 34 AD shortly part of the Roman province of Syria, and in 40 AD he was given the territories of Herod Antipas. In 41 AD, Emperor Claudius added to his territory the parts of Judea province that previously belonged to Herod Archelaus. Thus Agrippa I practically re-united his grandfather's kingdom under his rule. Agrippa died in 44 AD.

Agrippa's son Herod Agrippa II was appointed a tetrarch of Chalcis and later king of the territories previously ruled by Philip. He actively participated in the quelling of the Great Revolt of Judea on the Roman side. Agrippa II was the last of the Herodians; with his death in c. 92 or 100 AD the dynasty was extinct, and the kingdom became fully incorporated into the Roman province of Judaea.

In addition, Herod of Chalcis ruled as king of Chalcis, and his son, Aristobulus of Chalcis, was tetrarch of Chalcis and king of Armenia Minor.

== List of rulers ==
- Antipater the Idumaean (Procurator of Judaea) 47–44 BC
- Herod the Great
  - Governor of Galilee 47–44 BC
  - Tetrarch of Galilee 44–40 BC
  - Elected king of all Judaea by the Roman Senate 40 BC, reigned 37–4 BC
- Phasael (Governor of Jerusalem) 47–40 BC
- Pheroras (Governor of Perea) 20–5 BC
- Herod Archelaus (Ethnarch of Judaea) 4 BC – 6 AD
- Herod Antipas (Tetrarch of Galilee) 4 BC – 39 AD
- Philip the Tetrarch (Tetrarch of Batanaea) 4 BC – 34 AD
- Salome I (Tetrarch of Jabneh) 4 BC – 10 AD
- Tigranes V of Armenia (King of Armenia) 6–12 AD
- Herod Agrippa
  - King of Batanaea 37–41 AD
  - King of Galilee 40–41 AD
  - King of all Judaea 41–44 AD, previously Judaea (Roman province), given to him by Claudius, and reinstated as a province after his death.
- Herod of Chalcis (King of Chalcis) 41–48 AD
- Herod Agrippa II & Berenice
  - Tetrarch of Chalcis 48–53 AD
  - King of Batanaea 53–100 AD
- Aristobulus of Chalcis
  - King of Armenia Minor 55–72 AD
  - Tetrarch of Chalcis 57–92 AD
- Tigranes VI of Armenia (King of Armenia) 58–61 AD
- Gaius Julius Alexander (King of Cetis) 58–72 AD

== In the arts ==
=== Literature ===
==== Novels ====
- Hordos u-Miryam (1935), a Hebrew novel by Aaron Orinowsky
- Mariamne (1967), a Swedish novel by Pär Lagerkvist
- Claudius the God (1934), an English novel by Robert Graves, features Herod Agrippa I as an important character

==== Plays ====
- Herod appears in some cycles of the Mystery Plays, played as an over the top villain. Such portrayals were still in folk memory in William Shakespeare's time, for Hamlet instructs the players not to "out-Herod Herod" (Act 3, Scene 2).
- Marianna (1565), an Italian drama by Lodovico Dolce
- Mariam, the Faire Queene of Jewry (1613) an English drama by Elizabeth Tanfield Cary
- Herod and Antipater, with the Death of Faire Mariam (1622), an English drama by Gervase Markham and William Sampson
- Mariamne (1636), a French drama by François Tristan l'Hermite
- La mort des enfants d’Hérode; ou, Suite de Mariamne (1639), a French drama by Gathier de Costes de la Calprenède
- Herod and Mariamne (1673), an English drama by Samuel Pordage
- La Mariamne (1696), an Italian opera by Giovanni Maria Ruggeri (mus.) and Lorenzo Burlini (libr.)
- Mariamne (1723), a French drama by Elijah Fenton
- Herod features in two 18th-century French plays on Mariamne, by Nadal and Voltaire.
- Herodes und Mariamne (1850), a German drama by Christian Friedrich Hebbel
- Myriam ha-Hashmonayith (1891), a Yiddish drama by Moses Seiffert
- Tsar Irod I tsaritsa Mariamna (1893), a Russian drama by Dmitri Alexandrov
- Herod and Mariamne (1938), an English drama by Clemence Dane

==== Poetry ====
- Herod and Mariamne (1888), an English poem by Amelie Rives
- Mariamne (1911), an English poem by Thomas Sturge Moore

==== Movies ====
- The King of Kings (1927) by Cecil B. DeMille
- Salome (1953) by William Dieterie
- King of Kings (1961) by Nicholas Ray
- The Greatest Story Ever Told (1965) by George Stevens, David Lean, Jean Nugelesco
- Herod the Great (1959) (Italy) by Victor Tourjansky

=== Figurative arts ===
==== Painting ====
- Mariamne Leaving the Judgment Seat of Herod (1887), a painting by John William Waterhouse

=== Performing arts ===
==== Music ====
- Herod’s Lament for Mariamne (1815), an English song by Isaac Nathan (mus.) and George Byron (libr.)
- Herodes und Mariamne (1922), incidental music by Karol Rathaus
- Lied der Mariamne (ohne Worte) (1927), incidental music by Mikhail Gnesin

==== Ballet ====
- La Marianna (1785), an Italian ballet by Giuseppe Banti (chor.)

==== Opera ====
- Marianne (1796), opera in French with music by Nicolas Dalayrac and a libretto of Benoît-Joseph Marsollier
- Hérodiade (1881), opera in French by Jules Massenet after Gustave Flaubert's play Hérodias (1877)
- Salome (1905), opera in German by Richard Strauss after Oscar Wilde's play's Salome

== Family tree ==
Antipater the Idumaean procurator of Judea
1.Doris; 2.Mariamne I 3.Mariamne II	Herod I the Great ∞4.Malthace	5.Cleopatra of Jerusalem; 6.Pallas; 7.Phaidra; 8.Elpis	Phasael I
(1) Antipater heir of Judaea	(2) Alexander I heir of Judea	(2) Aristobulus IV prince of Judea	(3) Herod II Philip prince of Judea	(4) Herod Archelaus ethnarch of Judea, Idumea & Samaria	(4) Herod Antipas tetrarch of Galilea & Perea	(5) Philip the Tetrarch of Iturea & Trachonitis
Tigranes V of Armenia	Alexander II prince	Herod Agrippa I king of Judea	Herod V king of Chalcis	Aristobulus Minor prince of Judea
Tigranes VI of Armenia	Herod Agrippa II king of Batanaea	Aristobulus tetrarch of Chalcis
Gaius Julius Alexander ruler of Cilicia
Gaius Julius Alexander Berenicianus proconsul of Asia	Gaius Julius Agrippa quaestor of Asia
Lucius Julius Gainius Fabius Agrippa gymnasiarch

== See also ==
- Roman Palestine
- Herod's Temple
- Herodian coinage
- Kings of Israel and Judah
- Kings of Judah
- List of High Priests of Israel
- Promagistrate
- Siege of Jerusalem (37 BC)

== Bibliography ==
- Julia Wilker, Für Rom und Jerusalem. Die herodianische Dynastie im 1. Jahrhundert n.Chr. (Berlin, Verlag Antike, 2007) (Studien zur Alten Geschichte, 5).
