= Berenice (daughter of Mariamne) =

Member of the Herodian dynasty during the 1st century AD

Berenice was the daughter of Mariamne (daughter of Herod Agrippa) and Julius Archelaus, son of Chelcias (maybe Hilkiya in Hebrew, who was a friend and an officer at the court). She was born sometime after 50 CE. After her parents had divorced, she lived with her mother in Alexandria.
