= Raimondo Mei =

18th-century Italian composer

Raimondo Mei (1743 – after 1810) was an Italian composer who was maestro di cappella at Pavia. He composed several operas including an Ipermestra and an Ifigenia in Aulide to the librettos of Metastasio.
