= Aristobulus IV =

- prince of Judea
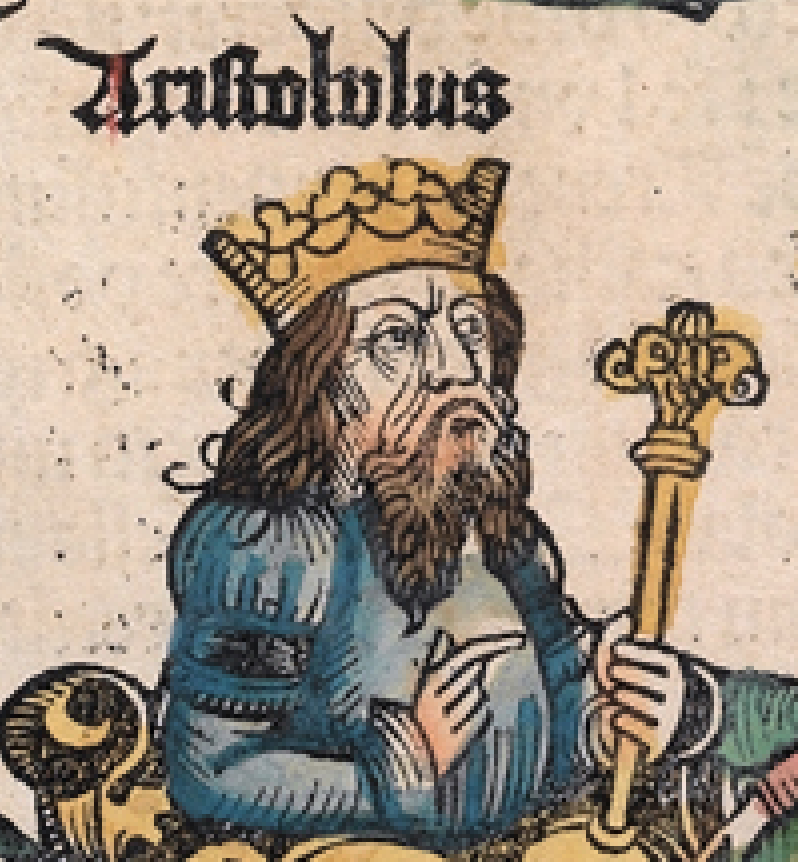
- Aristobulus IV, in the 1493 Nuremberg Chronicle
- Born: 31 BC
- Died: 7 BC
- Spouse: Berenice (daughter of Salome)
- Issue: Herod Agrippa I Herod of Chalcis; Aristobulus the Younger; Herodias; Mariamne III
Names
- Marcus Julius Aristobulus? (cf. his son Agrippa I)
- Dynasty: Herodian dynasty
- Father: Herod the Great
- Mother: Mariamne I Hasmonean

Aristobulus IV (31–7 BC) was a prince of Judea from the Herodian dynasty, and was married to his cousin, Berenice, daughter of Costobarus and Salome I. He was the son of Herod the Great and his second wife, Mariamne I, one of the last of the Hasmoneans, and was thus a descendant of the Hasmonean Dynasty.

Aristobulus lived most of his life outside of Judaea, having been sent at age 12 along with his brother Alexander to be educated at the Imperial court of Rome in 20 BC, in the household of Augustus himself. Aristobulus was only 3 years old when his paternal aunt Salome contrived to have his mother executed for adultery. When the attractive young brothers returned to Jerusalem in 12 BC, the populace received them enthusiastically. That, along with their perceived imperious manner, picked up after having lived much of their lives at the very heart of Roman imperial power, often offended Herod. They also attracted the jealousy of their older half-brother, Antipater II, who deftly incited the aging king's anger with rumors of his favored sons' disloyalty. After many failed attempts at reconciliation between the king and his designated heirs, the ailing Herod had Aristobulus and Alexander strangled on charges of treason in 7 BC, and raised Antipater to the rank of his co-regent and heir apparent.

Herod, however, retained affection for Aristobulus' children, three of whom, Agrippa I, Herod and Herodias, lived to play important roles in the next generation of Jewish rulers. A fourth, Aristobulus' eldest daughter Mariamne, was the wife of Antipater II at the time of his execution and, thereafter, may have been the wife of Ethnarch Herod Archelaus.

== Family tree ==
Alexander; HASMONEAN DYNASTY	Alexandra
Herod the Great; HERODIAN DYNASTY	Mariamne I d. 29 BC
Aristobulus IV d. 7 BC	Berenice I
Herod V of Chalcis	Mariamne III	Herodias	Herod Agrippa I	Aristobulus Minor
Aristobulus of Chalcis	Herod Agrippa II	Berenice II	Mariamne VI	Drusilla
