= Ethnarch =

Leader of a homogenous ethnic community

Ethnarch (pronounced /ˈɛθnɑːrk/, also ethnarches, Greek: ἐθνάρχης) is political leadership over a common ethnic group or homogeneous kingdom.

The word is derived from the Greek words ἔθνος (ethnos, "tribe/nation") and ἄρχων (archon, "leader/ruler"). Strong's Concordance gives the definition of 'ethnarch' as "the governor (not king) of a district".

== Antiquity ==
The title first appeared in the Hellenistic Middle East, possibly in Judea. In the First book of Maccabees the word is used three times (1 Maccabees 14:47 and 15:1-2), where Simon Thassi is referred to as the high priest and ethnarch of the Judeans. (Note: "And Simon accepted and was pleased to be high priest and to be commander and ethnarch of the Judeans and priests and to protect all of them." (1 Maccabees 14:47, NETS).)

It was used in the region even after it fell under the dominion of Rome, and into the early Roman Empire, to refer to rulers of vassal kingdoms who did not rise to the level of kings. The Romans used the terms natio and gens for a people as a genetic and cultural entity, regardless of political statehood.

The best-known is probably Herod Archelaus, son of Herod the Great, who was ethnarch of Samaria, Judea (Biblical Judah), and Idumea (Biblical Edom), from the death of his father in 4 BC to AD 6. This region is known as the Tetrarchy of Judea. His brother Philip received the north-east of the realm and was styled Tetrarch (circa 'ruler of a quarter'); and Galilee was given to Herod Antipas, who bore the same title. Consequently, Archelaus' title singled him out as the senior ruler, higher in rank than the tetrarchs and the chief of the Jewish nation; these three sovereignties were in a sense reunited under Herod Agrippa from AD 41 to 44.

Previously, Hyrcanus II, one of the later Hasmonean rulers of Judea, had also held the title of ethnarch, as well as that of High Priest.

In the New Testament the word is used only once by the Apostle Paul in his Second Epistle to the Corinthians (2 Corinthians 11:32). (Note: "In Damascus the ethnarch under Aretas the king was guarding the city of the Damascenes in order to seize me," (2 Corinthians 11:32, NASB).) However the definition of the word in terms of the actual jurisdiction and public office of the ethnarch may not be accurately determined.

== Byzantine Empire ==
The Byzantines used the term generically to refer to the rulers of barbarian tribes or realms outside the boundaries of their empire. In a Christian context, where ethnikos meant "pagan," some Church Fathers used the term ethnarches to designate pagan national gods. In the 10th century, the term acquired a more technical sense, when it was given to several high-ranking commanders. Although the specific nature of the title is not attested, it is generally accepted that in the 10th–11th centuries, it signified the commanders of the contingent of foreign mercenaries serving in the Byzantine army.

== Ottoman Empire ==
Rather different was the case of minority community ethnarchs, especially within the Islamic Ottoman Empire that were recognized as legitimate entities (millet) and thus allowed to be heard by the government through an officially acknowledged representative, though without political persona.

When the Ottoman Sultan Mehmet II decided to give such dialogue a more formal nature, the logical choice for the major Orthodox Christian communities was the Greek Orthodox Ecumenical Patriarch of Constantinople. The non-Chalcedonian Christians (Armenians, Syriacs, and Copts) were represented by the Armenian Patriarchate of Constantinople. For the far smaller, but also influential Jewish diaspora, a similar position was granted to the Hakham Bashi, i.e., chief rabbi.

== Modern Greece and Cyprus ==
In modern Greek usage, the term has the connotation of "father of the nation", and has been widely used as an epithet applied to perhaps the most influential political leader in modern Greek history: Eleftherios Venizelos. In more recent times, it has also been attributed to Konstantinos Karamanlis.

In the context of modern Cyprus, the term nearly always refers to Archbishop Makarios. Makarios was the last Archbishop to hold a double religious (Archebishop) and political (Leader of the Greek Cypriots) role under foreign rule, similar to the Ecumenical Patriarch under the Millet system. This regime, called the Ethnarchy, was retained during the British rule in Cyprus and survived in practice until independence in 1960. Additionally, Makarios became the first President of Cyprus after independence.

Unlike Venizelos and Karamanlis, who are rarely ever called ethnarches in such uses, streets of major Greek cities are named after Makarios: Greek: Εθνάρχου Μακαρίου, lit. 'Ethnarch Makarios(' str.)'

== References and sources ==
Bibliography

- Flavius Josephus
- Kazhdan, Alexander, ed. (1991), Oxford Dictionary of Byzantium, Oxford University Press, ISBN 978-0-19-504652-6
- STRONGS NT 1481: ἐθνάρχης. Strong's Concordance (Bible Hub). Retrieved: 18 August 2014.
- (in Greek) Γεώργιος Γρατσέας. "Έθνάρχης." Θρησκευτική και Ηθική Εγκυκλοπαίδεια (ΘΗΕ). Τόμος 5 (Διοκλητιανός-Ζώτος). Αθηναι – Αθαν. Μαρτινος, 1964. σελ. 351.
