= Costobarus =

Associate of Herod the Great

Costobarus (Greek: Κοστόβαρος) was an associate of Herod the Great (who made Costobarus governor of Idumea) and second husband of Herod's sister Salome I. He was also known as Costobar.

Another member of the Herodian dynasty was Costobar, who was the brother of Saul. Both Saul and Costobar were likely grandsons of Costobarus.

== Costobar(us), husband of Salome ==
Costobarus was an associate of Herod during the latter’s rise to power. Following the capitulation of Jerusalem in 37 BC during the campaign by Mark Antony and Herod against the Hasmonean king Antigonus II - Costobar controlled the exits from the city. Around this time, Antony appointed Herod as Tetrarch of Judæa and Herod appointed Costobarus as Governor of Idumæa and Gaza. In c. 34 BC, Herod gave his sister Salome in marriage to Costobarus.

While Costobarus “gladly accepted these favours, which were more than he had expected”, he was never “Herod's man". His focus was always towards Idumæa and his own ambitions in that region. Costobarus was from a noble and priestly family in Idumæa; and he resented that the Hasmonean John Hyrcanus had made the Idumæans adopt the customs and laws of the Jews. He “did not think ... it ... proper for him to carry out the orders of Herod, or for the Idumæans to ... be subject to them.” He also had ambitions to rule Idumæa himself, and “to achieve greater things”. These attitudes led him to three acts which aroused Herod against him and eventually led to his execution.

His first transgression to become known (but the second to be initiated) was to approach Cleopatra to ask Antony for Idumæa to be transferred to her (instead of to Herod), as it “had always belonged to her ancestors”. Costobarus was “ready to transfer his loyalty to her” and hoped that he would eventually become its ruler. Cleopatra did ask, but Antony refused. Herod sought to kill Costobarus as soon as he found out, but his mother and sister prevented him from doing so. Herod eventually pardoned Costobarus for his actions. But from then on, Herod no longer trusted Costobarus.

The next revelation (the third event in sequence) came as part of the divorce proceedings which Salome initiated against Costobarus. Between c. 27 BC and 25 BC, she issued him a writ of annulment (which the woman was not permitted to do under Jewish Law, but Salome did so none the less), and declared to Herod that she did this “out of loyalty to ... [Herod] himself”. She then informed Herod that Costobarus was intending to flee the country in the company of Herod’s brother Pheroras, who was out of favour with Herod at this time because of his infatuation with a slave girl and his consequent rejection of a marriage which Herod had arranged.

Then Salome added the third revelation (but the first and longest running transgression): Costobarus had been protecting, for at around 12 years, the sons of Baba, Herod’s enemies. When Costobarus had been guarding the exits to Jerusalem in 37 BC, Baba and his family were some of the people Herod had wished to restrain, but Costobarus hid them on his own estate (because of their popularity with the people), and later denied all knowledge of them. “And when the king [Herod] was informed of these things ... he sent [his officers] to the place where they were reported to be staying, and had them kill these men and those who were accused with them ...” And so, Costobarus was executed (c.27-25 BC).

== Costobar, brother of Saul ==
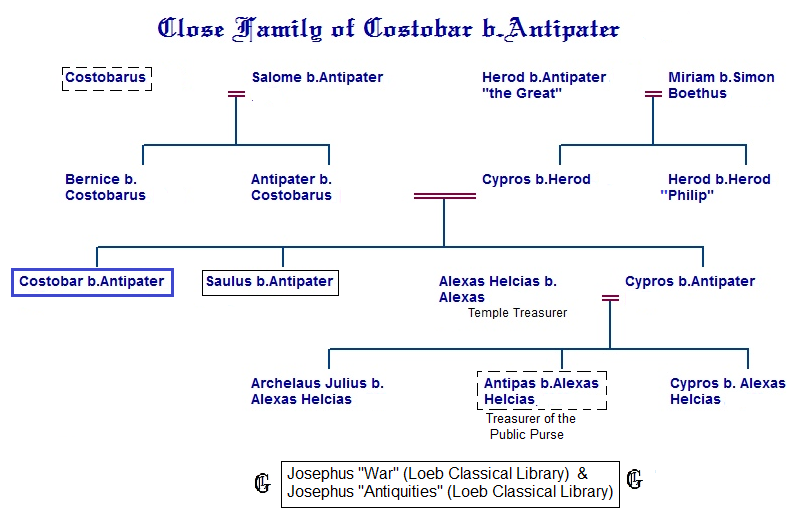
Close family of Costobar ben Antipater

Costobar and Saul were royal Herodian brothers, and kinsmen of Antipas ben Alexas, and of Agrippa II. While Josephus does not specify the parents of Costobar and Saul, the name “Costobar” provides a clue: their grandfather was very likely Costobar(us), the second husband of Salome, the sister of Herod “the Great”. “Costobar” is an uncommon name, there being only these two individuals so named in all of Josephus' writings. This means that Antipas ben Alexas was a nephew of Costobar and Saul, through their sister Cypros bat Antipater and Agrippa II was first cousin once removed to them through their aunt Bernice (Berenice), who married Aristobulus ben Herod and are the parents of Agrippa I.

When the Jewish insurrection against Roman rule was gaining momentum, Costobar, Saul and Antipas requested Agrippa II to send assistance to prevent the imminent uprising. The two brothers also were active against the insurgents.

Following the Battle of Beth-horon (25 November 66 AD) in which the Jewish insurgents defeated the Roman general Cestius, Costobar, Saul and Antipas were besieged in the royal palace. Subsequently, Costobar, with his brother Saul, escaped from Jerusalem to re-join Cestius: who dispatched them to Emperor Nero in Archaia, Greece.

Antipas, who had remained in Jerusalem, was arrested by the insurgents, and slain in prison by John ben Dorcus, (i.e. John benTabitha), who was under commission from the “brigands” [zealots].

There is a fringe theory that the Saul in Josephus' writings was the same person as Saul of the New Testament. According to this theory, references to Saul in Acts of the Apostles and some verses of Paul's Epistle to the Romans are believed to reveal connections to the Herodian royal family. In Acts of the Apostles, Saul is named in a list of Christian prophets and teachers in Antioch, following Manaen, who was “brought up with Herod the Tetrarch”, but the verse does not clearly connect Saul to Manaen, or to Herod; In the last chapter of the Epistle to the Romans, Paul sends greetings to a man named Herodion, whom he calls a kinsman (συγγενῆ). However, Herodion is a not uncommon name in the ancient world, and Paul refers to several others as kinsmen in the same chapter. This term likely meant nothing more than that they were also Jewish. If he were a member of the Herodian family, Saul would indeed have been a Roman citizen. His behaviour prior to his conversion, in which he “made havoc for the church” could be seen as reminiscent of that in which Costobar and Saul “were lawless and quick to plunder ... those weaker than themselves”, however, the account of the violent behaviour of Costobar and Saul in Josephus would have post-dated Paul's conversion to Christianity by decades.

== The Costobarian Herods ==
Costobarus and Salome (the elder) had two children: Bernice and Antipater. By her marriage to Aristobulus ben Herod, Bernice united the Costobarian and Hasmonean scions of the Herodians. The descendants of the two principals included two kings of Judæa - Herod Agrippa (Agrippa I), and his son Agrippa II, the Tetrarch, Herod of Chalcis, Herodias and Salome (the younger) of the New Testament, a line of treasurers of the Temple, and the brothers Costobar and Saul. The younger Salome was the matriarch of the Christian Aristobulus of Britannia according to Lionel Smithett Lewis, although his work does not follow the standards of modern genealogical research and is based on medieval legends. The family tree of these individuals is shown below.

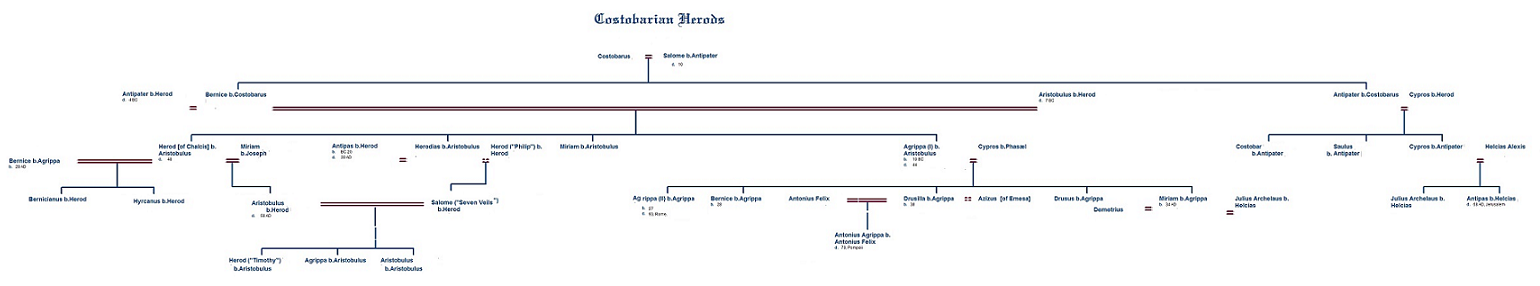
Costobarus, scion of the Herodians.
