= Herod of Chalcis =

Roman client king of Chalcis in Iturea (ruled 41-48 AD)

Herod V
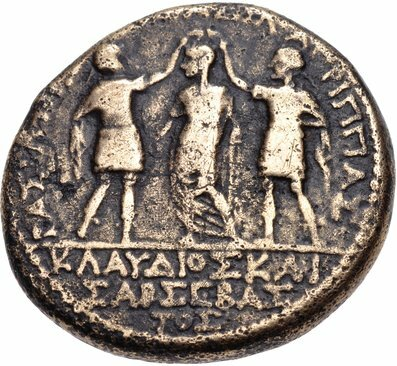
- Coin of Herod of Chalcis, showing him with his brother Agrippa of Judaea crowning Roman Emperor Claudius.

King of Chalcis
- Reign: 41–48 CE
- Died: 48 CE
- Spouse: Mariamne; Berenice
- Issue: Aristobulus V Berenicianus; Hyrcanus
- Dynasty: Herodian
- Father: Aristobulus IV
- Mother: Berenice

Herod of Chalcis (died 48 CE), also known as Herod Pollio King of Chalcis, Herod V, and listed by the Jewish Encyclopedia as Herod II, was a son of Aristobulus IV, and the grandson of Herod the Great, Roman client king of Judaea. He was the brother of Herod Agrippa I and Herodias and ruled as the king of Chalcis in 41–48 CE.

== Life ==
His first wife was his cousin, Mariamne. They had a son named Aristobulus, who also eventually became ruler of Chalcis.

After Mariamne's death, he married his niece Berenice, with whom he had two sons, Berenicianus and Hyrcanus.

Around 41 CE, at the request of his brother, Herod Agrippa, emperor Claudius granted him the rule of Chalcis, a territory north of Judaea, with the title of king. Three years later, after the death of his brother, he was also given responsibility for the Second Temple in Jerusalem, as well as the appointment of the Temple's High Priest. During the four years in which he exercised this right he appointed two high priests—Joseph, son of Camydus (44–46), and Ananias, son of Nedebeus (ca. 47–52).

He died in 48 CE. After his death the kingdom of Chalcis was given to Herod Agrippa II, but only as a tetrarchy.

== Family tree ==
Alexander	Alexandra
4.Malthace	Herod the Great	2.Mariamne I d. 29 BC
Aristobulus d. 7 BC	Berenice I
Herod Archelaus	Mariamne III	Herod of Chalcis	Herodias	Herod Agrippa I	Aristobulus Minor
Aristobulus of Chalcis	Herod Agrippa II

== See also ==
- Herodian dynasty
- Herodian kingdom
- List of Hasmonean and Herodian rulers
- 1st century in Lebanon

Herod of Chalcis House of Herod
New title	King of Chalcis – 48 AD	Succeeded by Agrippa II
