= Cleopatra of Jerusalem =

Fifth wife of King of Judea

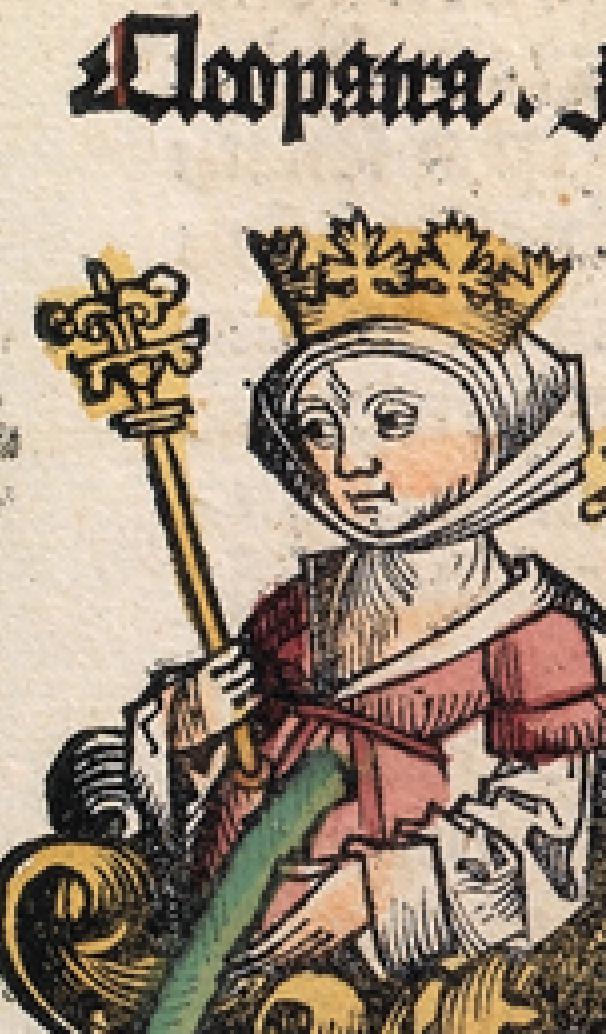
Cleopatra of Jerusalem, in the 1493 Nuremberg Chronicle

Cleopatra of Jerusalem was a woman who lived in the 1st century BC during the Roman Empire. She was the fifth wife of the King of Judea, Herod the Great.

== Biography ==
There is a possibility that Cleopatra could have been a daughter of a local noble from Jerusalem. She was born and raised in the city and could have been of Jewish or Edomite-Phoenician origins. Cleopatra was called Cleopatra of Jerusalem, to distinguish her from the Ptolemaic Greek Queen Cleopatra VII of Egypt.

Josephus mentions "Cleopatra of Jerusalem" twice: once in his Antiquities of the Jews 17.1.3 and once in his The Jewish War 1.28.4. Cleopatra of Jerusalem was not related to the Hasmonaean dynasty. She had married King Herod the Great in 25 BC. Herod possibly married her as a part of a political alliance.

Cleopatra had two sons with Herod who were:

- Philip (b. 22 BC/21 BC – 34) who later became the Tetrarch of Ituraea and Trachonitis.
- An unnamed second son, likely died young, lived in obscurity, or had no political significance.

Cleopatra's children by Herod were raised and educated in Rome. After the death of her husband in 4 BC, her first son inherited some of his father's dominion and ruled as a Roman client king until his death in 34. Cleopatra became the mother-in-law of Herodias.

== See also ==
- Cleopatra (given name)

== Sources ==
- Josephus: Antiquities of the Jews 17.1.3
- Josephus: The Jewish War 1.28.4
- https://virtualreligion.net/iho/herod2.html
- http://www.historyofthedaughters.com/69.pdf
- https://www.livius.org/he-hg/herodians/herod_the_great02.html
- Peter Richardson (1 January 1999). Herod: King of the Jews and Friend of the Romans. T&T Clark. p. 235. ISBN 978-0-567-08675-4.
- Aryeh Kasher; Eliezer Witztum (2007). King Herod: A Persecuted Persecutor : a Case Study in Psychohistory and Psychobiography. Walter de Gruyter. p. 180. ISBN 978-3-11-018964-3.
