= Mariamne III =

Judean noblewoman

Mariamne III was a daughter of Aristobulus IV and Berenice.

She had three brothers, Herod of Chalcis, Herod Agrippa I, and Aristobulus V, and one sister, Herodias.

Some time after the death of her father in 7 BCE, Mariamne III was betrothed to Antipater II, her uncle and the eldest son of Herod the Great. After Antipater's execution in 4 BCE, an anonymous Mariamne was the first wife of another uncle, Herod Archelaus, ethnarch of Judea but nothing permits to know if she was Mariamne III.
