= Salome I =

Herodian queen regnant

Territory of Salome I in 4 BCE, after Herod the Great's death and the partition of his kingdom

Salome I (c. 65 BCE – c. 10 CE) was the sister of Herod the Great and the mother of Berenice by her husband Costobarus, governor of Idumea. She was a nominal queen regnant of the toparchy of Iamnia, Azotus, Phasaelis from 4 BCE.

== Life ==
Salome first married Joseph I, uncle of Herod the Great; she accused Joseph of familiarities with Mariamne I, wife of Herod, and thus procured his death. She had three children by her second husband Costobarus, Berenice (who married first Aristobulus IV, Herod's son by the same mother, and second Theudion, brother of Herod's first wife Doris), Antipater, a character now lost to history, and a daughter whose name is not known (who married Alexas I's son Alexas the Younger, the Temple Treasurer). Like her more famous granddaughter (and grandniece) Herodias, she divorced her husband in contravention of Jewish law (Josephus, Jewish Antiquities 15.7.10):

But some time afterward, when Salome happened to quarrel with Costobarus, she sent him a bill of divorce and dissolved her marriage with him, though this was not according to the Jewish laws; for with us it is lawful for a husband to do so; but a wife, if she departs from her husband, cannot of herself be married to another, unless her former husband put her away. However, Salome chose to follow not the law of her country, but the law of her authority, and so renounced her wedlock...

After this she accused him of treason against Herod, who put him to death. Salome's third husband was Alexas I.

Berenice's children were Herodias, Herod Agrippa I, king of Judea, Herod of Chalcis and Aristobulus Minor, and Mariamne III (who may have been the first wife of her uncle, Herod Archelaus, ethnarch of Judea).

Salome I played a major background role in the court intrigues that plagued the royal family. She led Herod to execute his wife Mariamne I and their two sons. She encouraged Herod to favor his first son Antipater III. She disobeyed Herod's last command to execute the Judean elders he had detained as soon as he died.

Upon the death of Herod the Great in 4 BCE, she was given a toparchy including the cities of Iamnia, Azotus, Phasaelis, and 5000 drachmae. The Roman emperor Augustus supplemented this with a royal habitation at Ascalon. While nominally queen of these areas, they were ultimately subject to the Judaean prefect.

After Salome's death, Iamnia fell to Livia, the Roman empress, and then to her son Tiberius.

== See also ==
- List of Jewish leaders in the Land of Israel
