= Mariamne (daughter of Herod Agrippa) =

Daughter of Judean King Herod Agrippa I (b. 34/35)

Mariamne (born 34 or 35) was a king's daughter of King Agrippa I of ancient Roman Judea and Cypros. She was the paternal granddaughter of Aristobulus IV, and great-granddaughter of Herod the Great and Mariamne (Hasmonean Branch).

== Biography ==
=== Marriage ===
She was betrothed by her father to Julius Archelaus, son of Helcias/Chelcias (maybe Hilkiya in Hebrew who was a friend and an officer at the court), but this marriage had not yet been enacted upon her father's death. Her brother Agrippa II enacted the marriage once he had been made tetrarch in around 49/50. From this marriage was derived a daughter, whose name was Berenice.

Around 65 she left her husband and married Demetrius of Alexandria who was its alabarch and had a son from him named Agrippinus.
