= Herod Agrippa =

King of Judaea (11 BCE–CE 44) (r. 41–44)

Herod Agrippa I
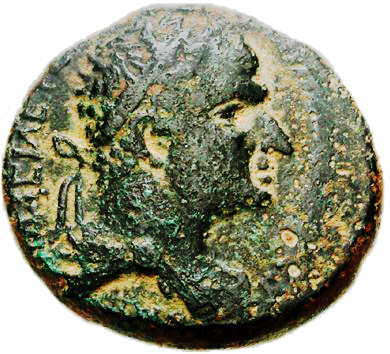
- Contemporary coin showing Agrippa I

King of Judea, Samaria, and Idumea
- Reign: AD 41–44
- Predecessor: Marullus (as prefect)
- Successor: Cuspius Fadus (as procurator)

King of Galilee and Perea
- Reign: AD 40–44
- Predecessor: Herod Antipas (as tetrarch)
- Successor: Herod Agrippa II (indirect, not all of Galilee and Perea)

King of Iturea, Trachonitis, Batanea, Gaulanitis, Auranitis, and Paneas
- Reign: AD 37–44
- Predecessor: Philip the Tetrarch
- Born: c. 11 BC; Caesarea Maritima
- Died: c. AD 44 (aged about 54); Caesarea Maritima
- Spouse: Cypros, daughter of Phasael II, son of Phasael I (brother of Herod the Great)
- Issue: Herod Agrippa II; Berenice; Mariamne; Drusilla; Drusus
Names
- Marcus Julius Agrippa
- Dynasty: Herodian
- Father: Aristobulus IV
- Mother: Berenice

Marcus Julius Agrippa I (c. 11 BC – c. AD 44), also known as Agrippa I (Hebrew: אגריפס, epithet Agrippa the Great) or Herod Agrippa, was a Roman citizen, under the patronage of Antonia Minor, friend of Roman emperors Caligula and Claudius, and the last client king of Judea (r. 41–44). He was a grandson of Herod the Great and Mariamne I, and he was the father of Herod Agrippa II, the last king from the Hasmonean branch of the Herodian dynasty. (Note: Agrippa II held a title of king but he reigned over other territories in the Eastern Mediterranean, not over Judea.) He played crucial roles in Roman politics under Caligula and was a "kingmaker" of Claudius. In return he was rewarded with the kingship of Judea, which brought a brief period of relative independence to Judea and significant influence in the Eastern portion of the Roman Empire.

He spent his childhood and youth at the imperial court in Rome, where he befriended the imperial princes Claudius and Drusus. He suffered a period of disgrace following the death of Drusus, which forced him to return to Judea. Back in Rome around 35, Tiberius made him the guardian of his grandson Tiberius Gemellus, and Agrippa approached the other designated heir, Caligula. The ascent of Caligula to the throne allowed Agrippa to become king of Batanea, Trachonitis, Gaulanitis, Auranitis, Paneas and Iturea in 37 by obtaining the old tetrarchies of Philip and Lysanias, then Galilee and Perea in 40 following the disgrace of his uncle, Herod Antipas.

After the assassination of Caligula he played an important role in Rome in the accession of Claudius to head of the empire in 41, and he was endowed with the former territories of Herod Archelaus (Idumea, Judea and Samaria), thus ruling a territory as vast as the kingdom of Herod the Great.

Carrying a dual Jewish and Roman identity, he interceded on behalf of the Jews with the Roman authorities and, on the domestic level, gave hope to some of his Jewish subjects of the restoration of an independent kingdom. Pursuing the Herodian policy of euergetism through major works in several Greek cities of the Near East, he nevertheless alienated some of his Greek and Syrian subjects, while his regional ambitions earned him the opposition of Marsus, the legate of Roman Syria.

Agrippa I died suddenly from an “infestation of worms” in 44. In a Christian context he is traditionally identified as the king simply named Herod whose death is recounted in Acts 12 (12:20–23).

== Biography ==
=== Origins ===
==== Family ====
Herod Agrippa was born in Caesarea Maritima around 11 BC. He was the son of Aristobulus IV, one of the children of Herod the Great and Mariamne the Hasmonean. His mother was Berenice, daughter of Salome, daughter of Antipater the Idumaean and sister of Herod the Great. Herod the Great was therefore both the paternal grandfather and the maternal great-uncle of Agrippa, and Agrippa thus descended from both the Hasmonean and Herodian dynasties. His parents marked the Roman status of this Jewish prince by naming him after Marcus Vipsanius Agrippa, a close collaborator of Emperor Augustus.

Herod the Great, a ruler perceived as a ruthless usurper by his subjects, was a devoted supporter of the Roman Empire and promoted its cause throughout his kingdom. His reign was characterized by violence and numerous family intrigues since he had 10 wives. In 29 BC Herod executed his wife Mariamne (Agrippa's grandmother). In 7 BC, when Agrippa was just three or four years old, Herod had two of his sons (Agrippa's father Aristobulus IV and his uncle Alexander) executed following more palace intrigues. These events also led to the executions of Antipater, a son of Herod and Doris, and Costobarus, Agrippa's maternal grandfather, three years later. Herod was responsible for the deaths of many members of the Hasmonean dynasty and its supporters, almost wiping them out entirely. However he spared the children of Aristobulus IV (including Agrippa, Herod, Aristobulus Minor, Herodias and Mariamne).

==== Imperial court ====
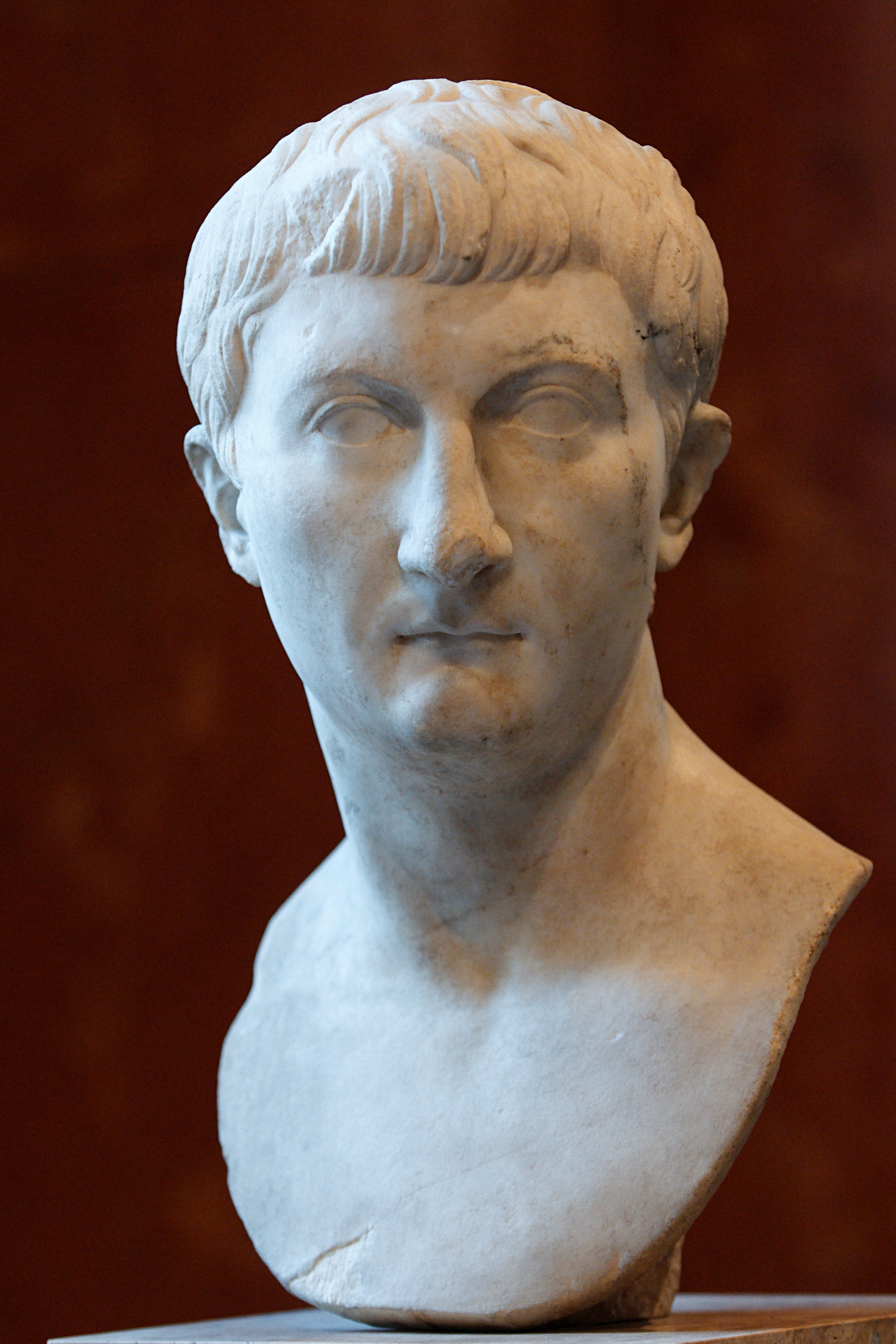
Bust of Drusus, c. AD 21

In 5 BC, two years after the murder of his father, the young Agrippa I was sent by Herod the Great to the imperial court of Rome in the company of Berenice as well as his brothers and sisters. He was supported there by his mother's friend Antonia Minor (sister-in-law of Tiberius – who would become emperor in 14 – and mother of the future emperor Claudius) as well as by Empress Livia, who was a friend of his grandmother. Agrippa I grew up in Rome with the children of the imperial family, including Drusus, the young son of Tiberius, to whom he was particularly attached, and Tiberius' nephew Claudius, who was the same age as Agrippa I. He thus lived all his youth in the capital of the empire and knew almost all the members of the imperial family. At that time Agrippa I's future appeared to be secured by his privileged relationship with Drusus (the heir apparent of Tiberius) and Claudius.

As young men Agrippa I and his friends Claudius and Drusus had a reputation for immorality and excess. Agrippa I got into debt as a result of his sumptuous lifestyle and received significant financial assistance from his uncle Herod Antipas. But Agrippa I's future darkened with the death of Drusus in 23, isolating him and leaving him helpless in the face of his creditors, especially since Berenice probably died at the same time. After the death of his son the distraught Tiberius reacted by removing Agrippa I and Claudius from his court.

=== Return to Judea ===
Agrippa I squandered the rest of his fortune trying to win the favor of the freedmen of Tiberius, and he hastily left Rome for the province of Judaea. In Judaea he experienced various adventures and scandals linked to the need to ensure his lifestyle without enjoying the corresponding income.

Around 26 Agrippa married his cousin Cypros (daughter of Phasael, son of the tetrarch Phasael), with whom he had a son named Herod Agrippa II. Agrippa I and Cypros lived in a fortress in Malatha of Idumea where they led a modest existence, far from the splendor of the imperial court.

Cypros got along well with Herodias, the wife of Herod Antipas, who encouraged Antipas to continue to help Agrippa I. Antipas provided him with money, offered to settle Agrippa I and his family in Tiberias and appointed him agoranomos (organizer of the agora) of the city, which provided him with a regular income. However this situation was short-lived. Agrippa I accepted at first but soon gave the impression of not being satisfied with what was given to him. He quickly found this burden boring in a small provincial town devoid of the amenities of the Roman civilization to which he had become accustomed. He quarreled with Antipas during a banquet in Tyre and then went to Syria, of which his friend Lucius Pomponius Flaccus was legate. Shortly afterwards he was disgraced following an intervention by his brother Aristobulus Minor, who denounced him to Flaccus for having received a bribe to defend the interests of Damascus against Sidon in a border dispute brought before his legate friend. Agrippa I then decided to attempt to return to Rome, where Tiberius might agree to receive his son's old friends again.

=== Back to Rome ===
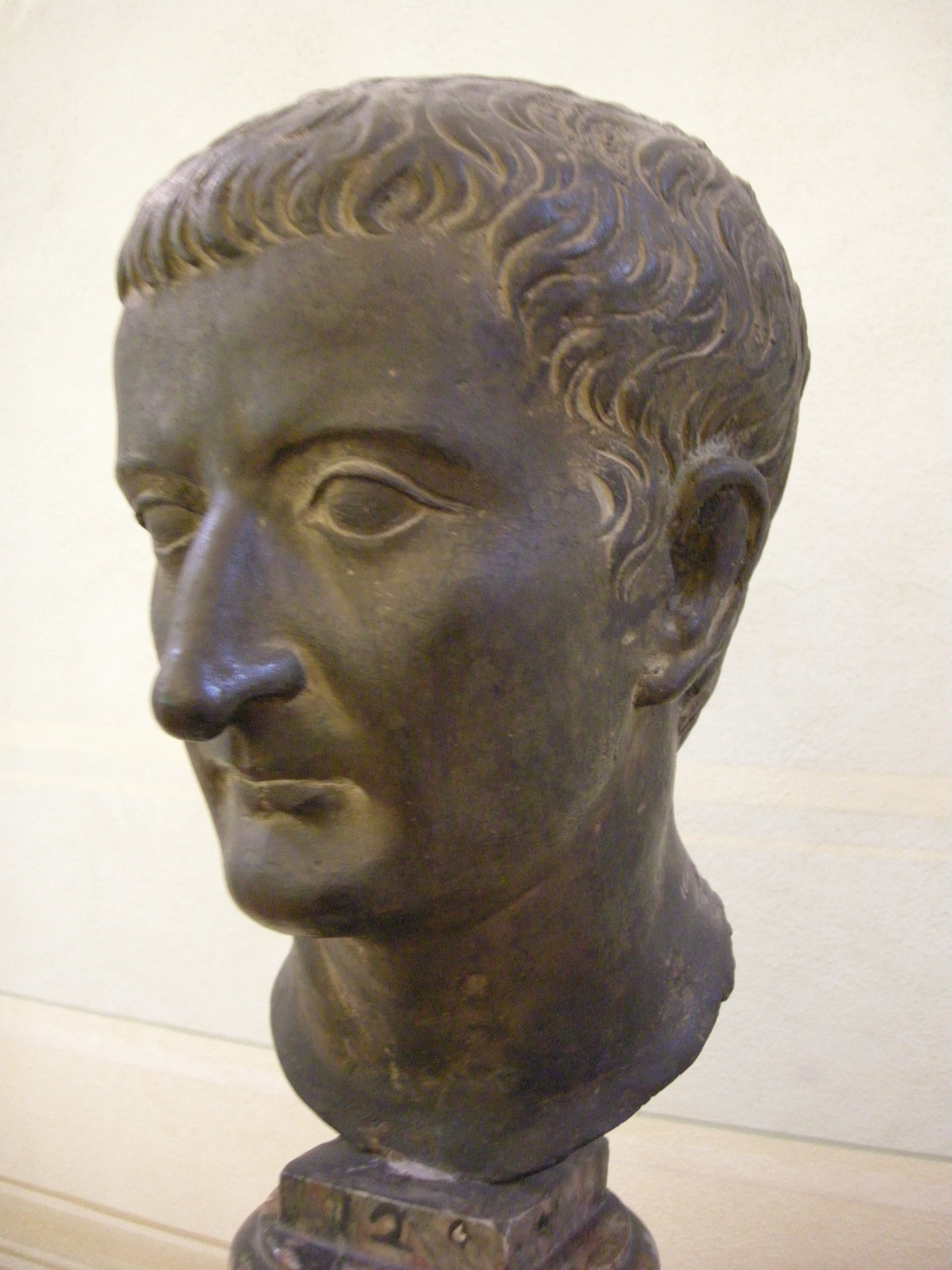
Bronze bust of Tiberius.

Agrippa I borrowed the sum of 20,000 drachmas to embark at Anthedon for Alexandria, after having been reminded by the Roman governor of Yavne, Herennius Capiton, for the debts contracted vis-à-vis the treasury of the empire. Herennius sent him the troop, but taking advantage of the night, Agrippa I embarked and managed to reach Alexandria where he obtained new funding from the alabarch Alexander Lysimachus, brother of Philo and head of the Jewish community of Alexandria. This senior official, belonging to a Jewish family of Roman citizens, was a large landowner and, like Agrippa I, a friend of Claudius. Lysimachus refused to lend the money directly to Agrippa I, whose reputation for profligacy was well established. It was with his capital of 200,000 drachmas that Agrippa embarked for Italy in the spring of 36.

Tiberius, retired to Capri, received Agrippa I and gave his son's former companion a warm welcome, which was soon tempered by a letter from the governor of Yavne about his debts. But Antonia Minor helped Agrippa I to get out of this new embarrassment by advancing him the totality of the sum due—300,000 drachmas—and Agrippa I regained imperial favour. All these details are found in the second work of Josephus, the Antiquities of the Jews, published around 93/94, during the reign of Domitian, but in book II of The Jewish War, his first account, published between 75 and 79, Josephus was more direct. It was "to accuse the tetrarch" Herod Antipas, that Agrippa I decided to go "to Tiberius", in order to try to take his domain, and it was because Agrippa I had been ousted from his pretensions to obtain the tetrarchy of Antipas that he would have started plotting against the emperor. Like other information about Agrippa, these are not found in the Judaic texts, whereas Josephus expands much on the subject.

The emperor asked Agrippa I to take charge of Drusus' son, his grandson Tiberius Gemellus, then a teenager and one of the two designated heirs of Tiberius with his grand-nephew Gaius Caligula, grandson of the protector of Agrippa I, Antonia. Antonia undertook to win the favors and friendship of Gaius, imitated in this by another prince without a kingdom, Antiochos of Commagene, and managed to contract a loan of one million drachmas from a Samaritan freedman of the emperor to carry out his project with the rising star of Rome. Although the conditions are unknown under which the friendship between the two men was forged, it must have been worth such an investment.

A flattery from Agrippa I to Caligula however caused him trouble: wishing in a conversation that the death of Tiberius would not be delayed any longer so that the young prince could succeed him, this remark was reported to Tiberius who ordered the arrest of Agrippa I. Agrippa I enjoyed a comfortable captivity and was released by Caligula shortly after the death of Tiberius on 16 March 37, when Pontius Pilate arrived in Rome.

The accession to the throne of his friend began Agrippa I's fortune. Caligula offered Agrippa I a gold chain "of the same weight as the chain of his captivity". He granted him, in addition to the title of king and the diadem which was its sign, the territories of Philip, who had died shortly before, tetrarch of Iturea, Trachonitis, Batanea, Gaulanitis, Auranitis and Paneas, located northeast of the lake of Tiberias. Caligula also conferred on him the praetorian ornaments, a dignity which allows certain non-senators to sit among them during public celebrations. "This completely exceptional reversal of the situation seems to have greatly impressed Agrippa's contemporaries."

According to Josephus, after he placed the royal diadem on the head of Agrippa I, Caligula sent Marullus as "hipparch (ἱππάρχης) of Judea" to replace Pontius Pilate, who had been dismissed by Lucius Vitellius and had just arrived in Rome. Agrippa I showed no eagerness to take charge of the affairs of his kingdom, and it was only in the summer of 38 that he went to Batanea for a short stay.

=== Troubles in Judea ===
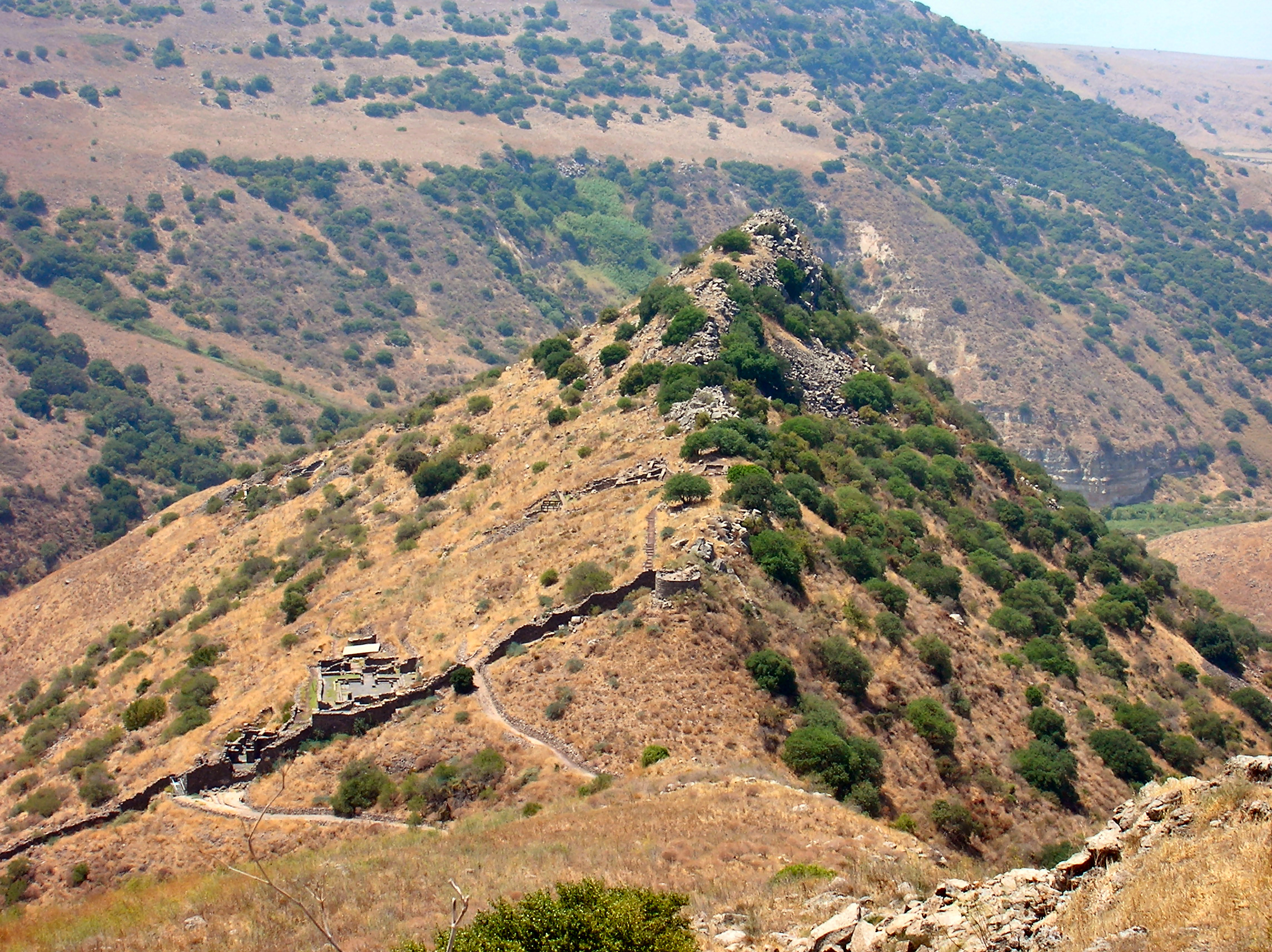
Ruins of the fortified city of Gamla, stake in the war between Aretas IV and Herod Antipas. (At the bottom, we can see the Lake of Tiberias.)

During his stay in Rome, several events took place in Judaea which created a very tense situation. Since 35, the Romans and the legate of Syria Lucius Vitellius were engaged in a decisive confrontation against the Parthians and their king Artabanus III about the control of the Kingdom of Armenia. In 36, (Note: There is almost unanimity among historians specializing in the period and the region in following the chronological indications provided by Flavius Josephus and situating this battle in 36; see Simon Claude Mimouni, Ancient Judaism from the 6th century BC to the 3rd century AD: From priests to rabbis, ed. P.u.f./New Clio, 2012, p. 407; Christian-Georges Schwentzel, Herod the Great, Pygmalion, Paris, 2011, p. 216-217; E. Mary Smallwood, The Jews under Roman Rule, p. 189; Lester L. Grabbe, Judaism from Cyrus to Hadrian, Vol. II, Fortress Press, Minneapolis, 1992, p. 427; Nikkos Kokkinos, in Jack Finegan, Chronos, kairos, Christos: nativity and chronological studies, ed. Jerry Vardaman & Edwin M. Yamauchi, 1989, p. 135. However, to resolve the contradiction between Flavius Josephus who provides indications that place the death of John the Baptist around 35 and the Christian tradition which places it in 29, Christiane Saulnier takes up Étienne Nodet's proposal which supposes that Josephus is mistaken and therefore places this battle before 29. This proposal, however, does not meet with great reception among historians, but meets with some success among denominational authors.) the armies of two kings who were clients of the Romans, Aretas IV and Herod Antipas, clashed around the territory of Gamla, causing a crushing defeat for Antipas. According to Movses Khorenatsi, as well as several sources in Syriac and Armenian, King Abgar V of Edessa provided auxiliary forces to Aretas. However, the historicity of this mention is disputed by Jean-Pierre Mahé. It is possible that Aretas took advantage of Antipas' participation in the great conference on the Euphrates, to conceal peace and the Roman victory over Artabanus (autumn 36), to launch his offensive. The territorial claim of the Nabataeans was revived by Antipas' will to repudiate Phasaelus, the daughter of Aretas, to marry Herodias, the sister of Agrippa I. Antipas' goal was dynastic. It is a question of consolidating his position to be named by the emperor at the head of the tetrarchy of Philip who has just died or to be named king. At some point in this conflict, probably between 29 and 35, Antipas attempted to silence his opposition by executing John the Baptist. This execution seems to have had important repercussions on the political situation in the region for several years. Thus the defeat of Antipas is considered within the Jewish population as a divine revenge against Antipas to punish him for having put John to death and of which Aretas would have been only the instrument.

According to Simon Claude Mimouni, the governorship of Pontius Pilate was one of the five high points of the troubles that Judea experienced between the death of Herod the Great and the outbreak of the Great Jewish Revolt, punctuated by no less than six major incidents, to which must be added the crucifixion of Jesus of Nazareth and possibly the sedition of Jesus Bar Abbas, whose popularity is reported in the Synoptic Gospels. However, for some historians, the two Jesuses are one, the evangelists using a literary device to describe two faces of Jesus, while exempting the Romans from their responsibility in this execution, so that the Gospels cannot be suspected of containing the slightest criticism of the authorities in power.

In 36, Pontius Pilate quickly suppressed a gathering of Samaritans on Mount Gerizim. The gathering had a messianic connotation whose leader—whom Josephus avoids naming—sought to appear as the eschatological prophet similar to Moses, one of the three messianic figures found in the Dead Sea Scrolls. A figure that has also been attributed to John the Baptist and Jesus the Nazorean. Certain Church Fathers, as well as the Mandaean tradition and in particular one of their writings, the Haran-Gawaita, provide indications according to which it could be Dositheos of Samaria who succeeded to the head of the movement of John the Baptist after his execution, for he was one of his disciples. Pilate crucified their leaders and the most prominent personalities that he managed to capture. At the end of 36, Vitellius used the complaints of the Council of Samaritans about this incident as a pretext to dismiss Pilate at the end of a ten-year term so that he explains to the emperor what the Jews are accusing him of. On the following Passover, he came in person to Jerusalem to dismiss the high priest Caiaphas, who was too closely linked to Pilate, and restored to the priests of the temple the supervision of the ceremonies of the Jewish worship festivals. When the death of Tiberius was announced at Pentecost in 37, Vitellius, reluctant to support Antipas with his troops, interrupted the march of his two legions against Aretas, considering that he could no longer wage war without orders from the new emperor. He made the people swear loyalty to Caligula and once again dismissed the high priest whom he had appointed 50 days earlier.

=== Establishment of the kingdom ===
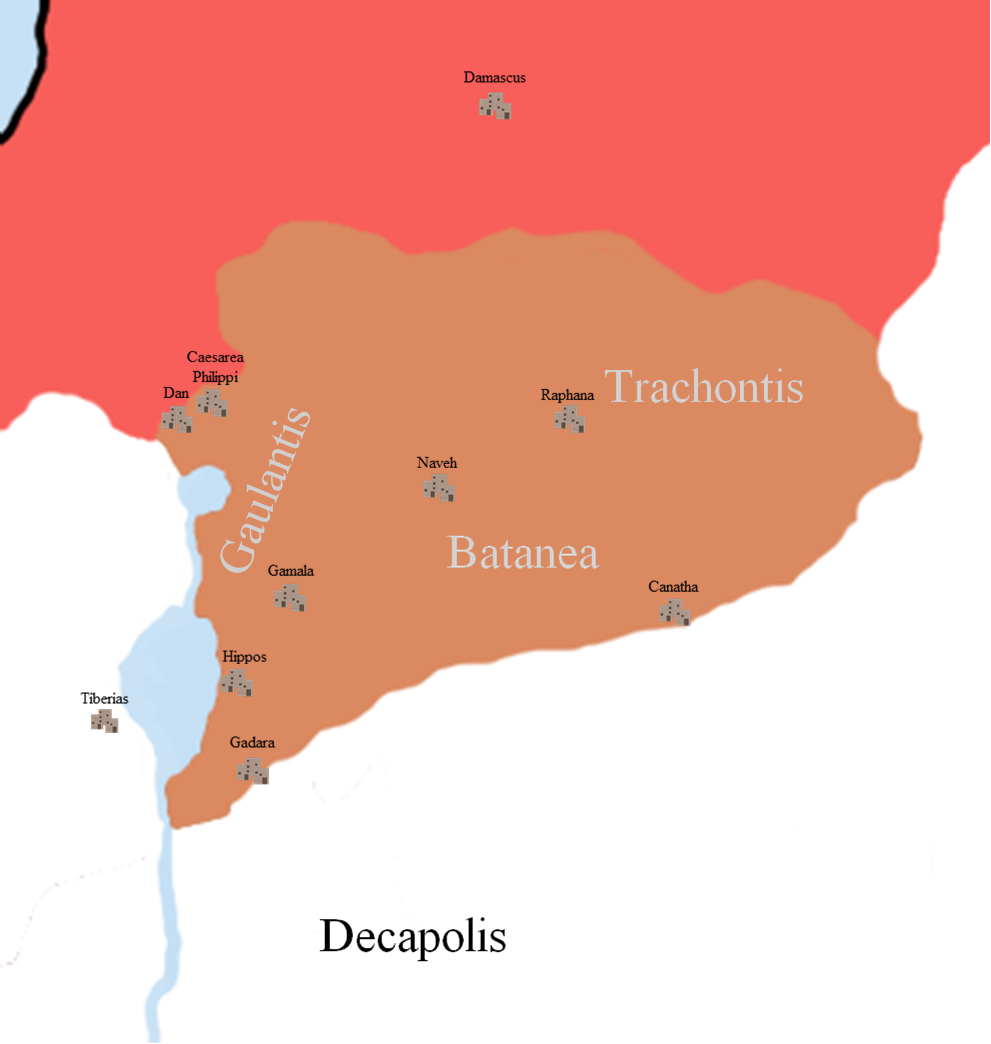
Tetrarchy of Philip, main part of the kingdom given to Agrippa I (the kingdom of Lysanias called Abilene was located further north in the Roman province of Syria)

Agrippa I returned to his territories in the summer of 38. Josephus does not recount the conditions under which the Nabataean troops withdrew from the former tetrarchy of Philip, which constituted the bulk of the territories attributed to Agrippa I. In an agreement between Aretas and Caligula, Damascus was transferred to Nabathean control.

On the way to his new kingdom, Agrippa I passed through Alexandria around July 38 where he probably lodged with the alabarch Alexander Lysimachus, the brother of Philo of Alexandria and the father of Tiberius Alexander. whose daughter Berenice would marry the son Marcus Alexander a few years later. There was then an anti-Jewish atmosphere in the city that had lasted for some time. During festivities, Agrippa was the target of a popular anti-Jewish masquerade featuring an "idiot" nicknamed Karabas, (Note: Some critics see this in the parody as a reference to the crucifixion of Jesus because it resembles in many ways what was done to one of the two Jesuses — Jésus Barabbas and/or Jesus the King of the Jews — in the accounts of the Passion contained in the Gospels. The very name by which the actors of this parody call their victim (Karabbas) makes one think of Barabbas, the alter ego of Jesus Christ in these stories. This proximity is both phonetic and graphic. Especially since in ancient Christian texts the nicknames or cognomen Barsabas and Barabbas are often connected to the names of members of the family of Jesus, such as the brother of Jesus called Joseph Barsabbas or the one called Judas who in the Codex Bezae of the Acts of the Apostles is even nicknamed Judas Barabbas, while in current versions he is named Judas Barsabas, or as the fourth bishop of Jerusalem after the death of Simeon of Clopas also called Judas Barsabas and given as a son of James the Just, the brother of Jesus. Furthermore, this event takes place in August 38, less than 18 months after Pontius Pilate was fired by Lucius Vitellius "to explain himself to the emperor". Like for Jesus, the surnamed Karabas is given a chlamys or a mat as a royal garment, an improvised crown on his head and a reed is given to him as a scepter, then those who impose this masquerade on him derisively pretend to consider him like a king. Moreover, the title which is given to the surnamed Karabbas by these Greek inhabitants of Alexandria is singularly an Aramaic and Syriac word, that of Maran which translates as "Lord", title which is very often given to Jesus in the gospels. The current language in Judea at the time being Syriac, it is this same word of “Maran” which was to be pronounced by the disciples of Jesus to give him the title of Lord. Finally, this masquerade was intended to make fun of Agrippa I^{st}, the new Jewish king whom Caligula has just named, passing through Alexandria on his way to his territories, while Jesus was condemned for having proclaimed himself "King of the Jews" or for having been so by his followers.) foreshadowing the Jewish-Alexandrian conflict that agitated the city from 38 to 41. These troubles led the two parties—Jews and Alexandrian Greeks—to each send three delegates to the emperor to settle the deeper conflict between the two communities. Philo was one of the Jewish delegation.

The return of Agrippa I excited the jealousy of his sister Herodias who urged her husband Antipas to claim for himself the title of king in Rome. In 39, Antipas resolved to meet Caligula to try to obtain this imperial favor, which precipitated his loss. Informed of this trip, Agrippa dispatched his most faithful freedman to Rome, bearing a letter for the emperor, followed soon after by Agrippa I himself. (Note: Again, in The Jewish War, Josephus gives a different version. “Agrippa had followed” Antipas to Rome “to accuse him” and thus obtained his dismissal. What he fails to relate in the Jewish Antiquities written 20 years later.) In the letter he accuses Antipas of fomenting a plot with the Parthians and of having accumulated, without informing the emperor, stocks of arms in his arsenals in Tiberias, probably with the intention of preparing his revenge against Aretas who had defeated him a few years earlier. While the second accusation is probably true, the first is doubtful. As a result of the letter, Caligula exiled Antipas to the south of Gaul and Herodias followed. As for Agrippa I, he received the territories of Antipas—Galilee and Peraea—as well as all the property confiscated from Antipas and Herodias.

=== Statue of Caligula ===
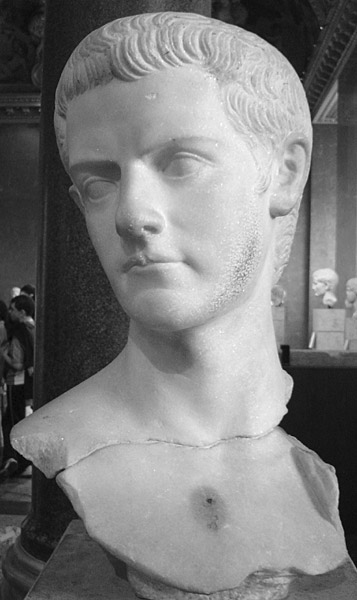
Bust of Caligula (Louvre).

Following the clashes between Jews and Greeks in Alexandria, for confused reasons the delegation led by Philo of Alexandria to Caligula learned "with horror" of the emperor's project to erect his own statue in the Temple of Jerusalem in gold under the guise of Zeus. According to Josephus, it is possible that the emperor was sensitive to the arguments of the delegation of Greeks from Alexandria led by Apion who, in the conflict between the two parties, complained of the "privileges" granted to the Jews. For the Jewish historian Goodman, Caligula intended to develop the imperial cult and to place himself above the politics of mortals in his lifetime and had the idea of imposing his divine status on the empire, whatever the political consequences.

Caligula's initiative horrified the Jewish subjects of the empire and caused unrest in the diaspora in Rome as well as in Alexandria, Thessaloniki, Antioch and in Judea, (Note: According to Étienne Nodet and Justin Taylor then François Blanchetière, it was during this agitation that the term “Christian” appeared, coined by the Romans to designate similar protesting Messianic Jews to the zealots; see Étienne Nodet and Justin Taylor, Essay on the origins of Christianity: an exploded sect, ed. Cerf, 1998, p. 286-287; François Blanchetière, Enquête sur les racines juives du mouvement chrétien (30-135), ed. Cerf, 2001, p. 147.) particularly in Galilee. Caligula enjoined the proconsul of Syria, Publius Petronius, to place the statue willingly or by force in the "Holy of Holies" of the Temple of Jerusalem, violating Judaic aniconism in the holiest place of this religion. Petronius disposes necessary armed troops—two Roman legions and auxiliaries—which he barracks at Ptolemais in Phoenicia in the event of an uprising, and his mission was to accompany the procession of the statue—being made in Sidon—through Judea. The population rushed in numbers to Ptolemais, supported by the Jewish religious authorities, then to Tiberias where the troubles continued for about 40 days. Petronius met with Aristobulus brother of Agrippa I (Agrippa I was in Rome at the time) in the presence and under the pressure of the crowd. Convinced of the imminence of a major revolt, Petronius tempered with the emperor by an exchange of letters exposing—at the risk of his life—the difficulties of the situation: the inhabitants of Galilee were close to a revolt, and the Judeans were at risk of setting fire to the crops just before harvesting, while preparing for war. The emperor's first response was fairly moderate, but some sources report a “furious” response from Caligula to Petronius, not considering any compromise.

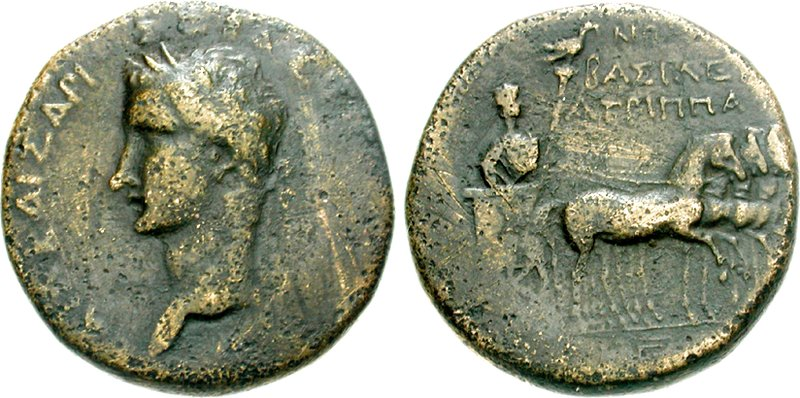
Coin minted under Agrippa I. Profile of Caligula on the left, Germanicus on his triumphal chariot, on the right.

While Agrippa I was in Rome (Note: According to Cassius Dio, Agrippa I had a very bad reputation among the Romans. In the'Roman History, summarized by the monk John Xiphilinus in the 9th century, it is written: "these miseries were less painful for the Romans than the expectation of an increase in cruelty and intemperance on the part of Caius (Caligula), especially because it was learned that he was intimately connected with kings Agrippa and Antiochus, as teachers of tyranny", Cassius Dio, Roman History, book LIX, 24.) it is possible he learned of the affair from Caligula, which plunged him into a conflict between his two identities, Jewish and Roman. After a few days of reflection, he took the side of his Jewish compatriots in the defense of the Temple threatened with desecration: for Josephus, it was a discussion during a banquet; for Philo, it was a request addressed to the emperor, the content of which he reports, although in terms that reveal a certain exaggeration of the role of Agrippa. Agrippa I pleaded "that the ancestral institutions are not disturbed. For what of my reputation among my countrymen and other men? Either I must be considered a traitor to myself or I must cease to be counted among your friends; there is no other choice…”.

At first, Caligula seemed to give in to his friend's pleas and instructed Petronius to suspend his action towards Jerusalem, while warning the Jewish populations not to take any action against the shrines, statues and altars erected in his honor, as a reproduction of Caligula's letter by Josephus seems to attest. But the emperor seemed to reconsider his decision and it was the murder of Caligula that seemed to put a definitive end to the enterprise and put an end to the desire for a popular uprising. Josephus recounts how the emperor, suspecting Petronius of having been bribed to break his orders, ordered him to commit suicide, but this letter arrived after the announcement of Caligula's death, in which Josephus saw an effect of Providence. This temporary success of Agrippa I testifies to the close relations which bound him with the most important personalities of the Roman world, which was confirmed during the succession of the assassinated emperor.

=== Death of Caligula and installation of Claudius ===
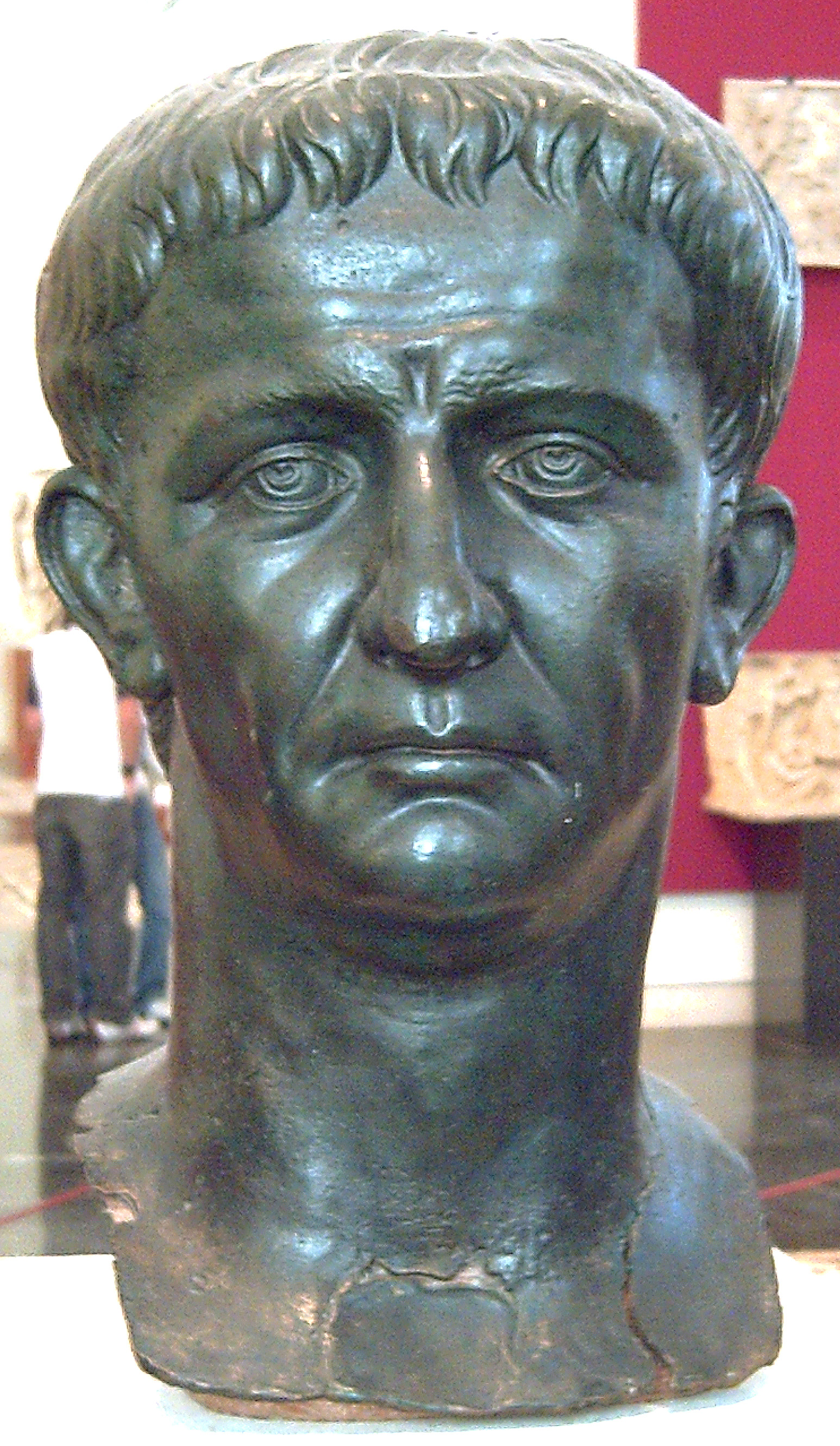
Bronze bust of Claudius.

On 24 January 41, Caligula was assassinated by a large-scale conspiracy, notably involving the praetorian commander Cassius Chaerea as well as several senators. The conspirators intended to return to a republic. Yet it was Claudius, Caligula's uncle, who was pushed to imperial power by the anti-republicans under curious conditions at the center of which Agrippa I gravitated. Claudius was certainly erudite but nevertheless excessively shy, afflicted with a physical handicap and without particular ambition. The support of his childhood friend, as well as his maneuvers, seem to have been decisive in his ascent to power.

Josephus and Roman historian Cassius Dio both state that Agrippa I indeed played a significant role in the choice of the new emperor. It was he who led a squad of the Praetorian Guard to the palace in search of Claudius, who had hidden there for fear of being assassinated. It was also at his instigation that the praetorians proclaimed Claudius emperor because without a sovereign, the guard lost its raison d'être. He then went to the Capitol where the senators met in conclave and acted as intermediaries between them and Claudius. He inspired Claudius with a response to the senators, "in conformity with the dignity of his power," and he persuaded them to wisely abandon their idea of a republic, arguing that a new emperor has been proclaimed by the praetorians—of whom he pointed out that 'they surround the meeting"—and expected nothing but their enthusiastic support. The senators proclaimed Claudius emperor, and Agrippa I recommended that Claudius be lenient vis-à-vis the conspirators, except for the regicides Cassius Chaerea and Lupus.

Evolution of the Kingdom of Agrippa I.

If these stories are to be believed, this episode made Claudius obligated by his childhood friend, and this devotion earned him a sizeable reward: Agrippa I saw his possessions increased by most of the ancient kingdom of Herod Archelaus—Judea, Idumea and Samaria—but also the city of Abila in Anti-Lebanon so that he reigned over a territory as vast as that of his grandfather Herod the Great. According to Cassius Dio, Claudius also granted his friend consular rank and authorized him "to appear in the senate and express his gratitude in Greek". To mark the considerable status of Agrippa I, a treaty was ratified with the Senate and the people of Rome on the Forum, which took up the old treaties of friendship and Judeo-Roman alliance. Agrippa I was declared there rex amicus et socius Populi Romani—as his grandfather had been in 40 BC.—and the text is preserved on bronze tablets in the temple of Jupiter Capitolinus.

Soon after his inauguration, Agrippa I embarked for Judaea. It was the same year that Berenice, daughter of Agrippa I, united under the patronage of the emperor to Marcus, the son of the alabarch of Alexandria, Alexander Lysimachus whom Claudius had freed from the captivity to which the reduced Caligula. Claudius' accession to the throne also marked the restoration of several other kingdoms in Asia Minor. Agrippa I's brother Herod of Chalcis received a royal title, was granted the principality of Chalcis (previously attached to the kingdom of Iturea) and was honored in Rome with the title of praetor. He would marry his niece, Bérénice, after the premature death of her young husband.

=== Reign ===
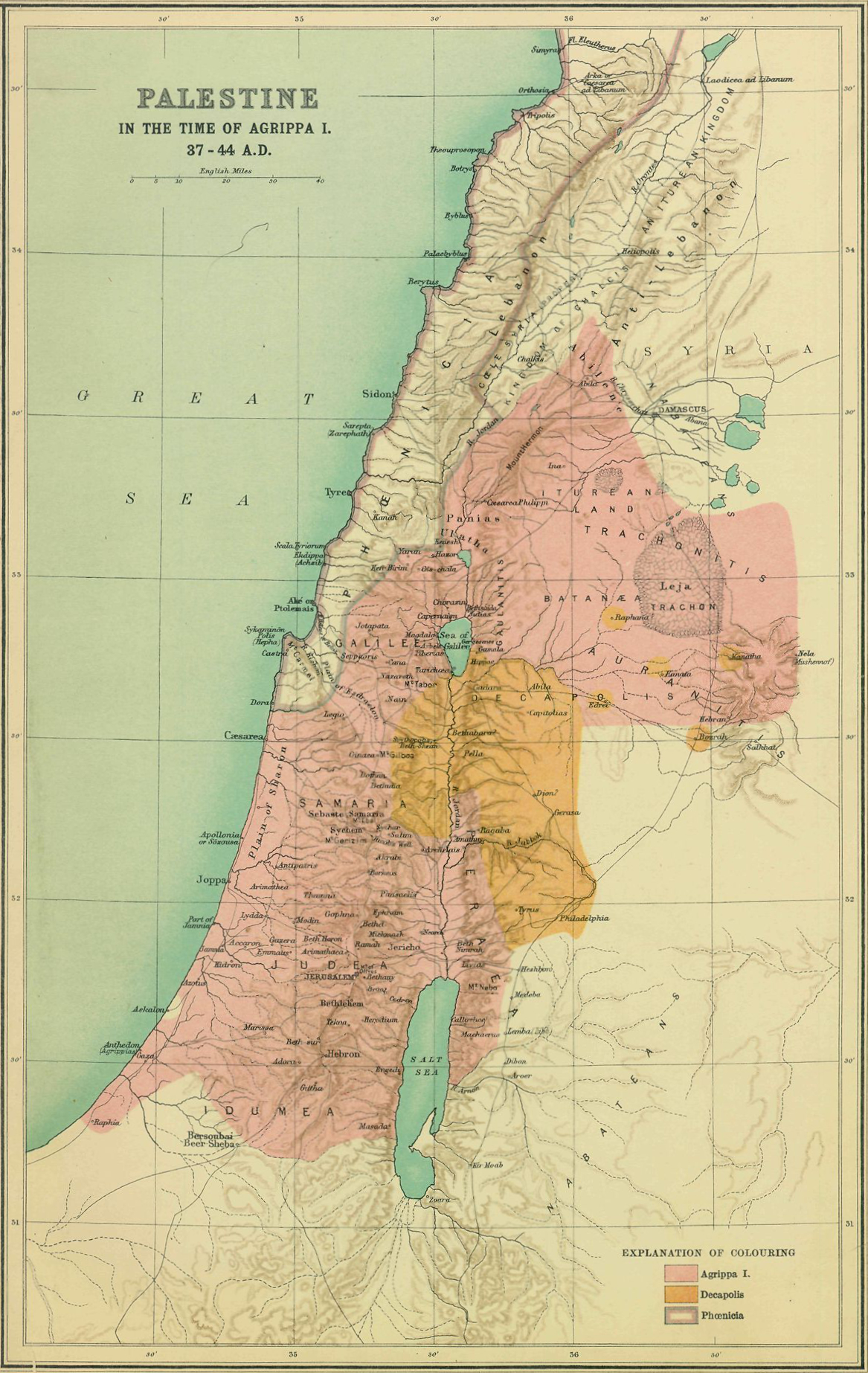
Map of Judea in the time of Agrippa I (37–44 AD)

==== Judaism in the empire ====
An edict by Claudius recalls the privileges granted to Alexandrian Jews who lived according to their laws, and a second edict extended the Alexandrian privileges to the Jews of the diaspora throughout the whole empire. Agrippa I and his brother Herod of Chalcis played the role of intercessor in favor of the Jews with the emperor. These favors also extended to all the Jewish communities of the empire. They also had the status of censors of Jewish morals: they ensured respect for the Torah by the communities of the diaspora.

A few months after the murder of Caligula, inhabitants of the Phoenician city of Dôra (south of Mount Carmel) introduced a statue of Claudius into the main synagogue of the city. For all those who stood up against Caligula's plan to erect his statue in the Temple of Jerusalem, it was a real provocation. Agrippa I intervened immediately and asked for the application of the decree of Claudius. He acted here as an ethnarch of the Jews, since Dora was not located on his territory. Petronius, the proconsul of Syria immediately ordered the magistrates of Dora to remove the statue, referring to the edict of Claudius. However, this openness must be put into perspective, which is also reflected in the measures to limit worship against the Jews of Rome, as Cassius Dio reports (History, 60, 6, 6–7), perhaps in reaction to the agitation resulting from the rapid development of the movement of the followers of Jesus and which would be evoked by the Letter of Claudius to the Alexandrians. For François Blanchetière, the writing of Philo Legation to Gaius "constitutes an apology for Augustus, to be read a contrario as a criticism of the Judeophobic policy of Claudius (Legation to Gaius 155–158)".

==== Administration of the kingdom ====
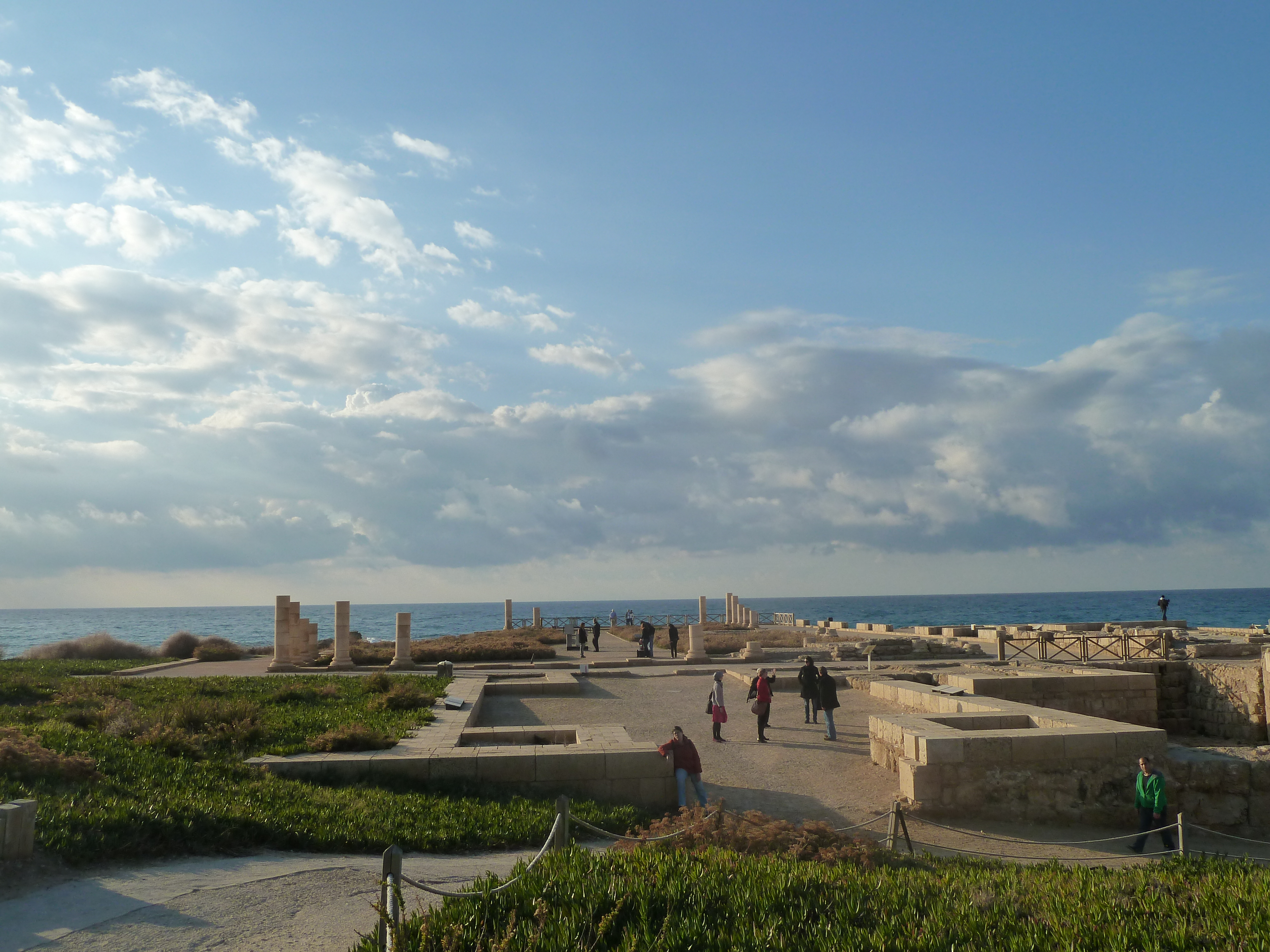
Remains of the Herodian Palace in Caesarea.

Claudius probably saw in the appointment of Agrippa I—heir to the Herodians and the Hasmoneans but also attached to the Julio-Claudians by personal relations—a factor of stability which could rid the imperial administration of the management of a province with endemic troubles.

Agrippa I clearly inherited his grandfather's splendor and his desire for recognition beyond his borders. Internally, he tried to satisfy both his Jewish and pagan subjects and was divided between his religious capital, Jerusalem, and his "little Rome", Caesarea. He also undertook the major project of raising the ramparts of his historic capital and extending it to the northern district thanks to funding from the Temple treasury, which gave some of his Jewish subjects hope for the restoration of an independent kingdom. or at least a rediscovered form of sovereignty. He continued the policy of euergetism external to Judea of Herod the Great by financing the construction of prestigious works (theatre, amphitheater and baths) in liberalities which mainly benefited the Roman colony of Berytus, without forgetting however the cities of Phoenicia and Syria. He also offered shows and games, notably with gladiators, even if this contravened Jewish prescriptions, which he got accepted by using condemned criminals.

On a religious level, as soon as he arrived, Agrippa I forged the reputation of a pious man, as attested by the Mishnah, which recounts an orchestrated ceremony where the king was acclaimed and obtained the legitimacy of the priests in the Temple of Jerusalem while his grandfather Herod had never been admitted to the third court of the Temple. However, through his grandmother, Mariamne the Hasmonean, Agrippa I belonged to a priestly family, which Herod did not. He was thus the first Herodo-Hasmonean to participate in a Temple office since the dismissal of the Antigonus II Mattathias, although he did not offer sacrifices.

The Mishnah explains how the Jews of the Second Temple era interpreted the requirement of Deuteronomy 31:10–13 that the king should read the Torah to the people. At the conclusion of the first day of Sukkot immediately after the conclusion of the seventh year in the cycle, they erected a wooden dais in the Temple court, upon which the king sat. The synagogue attendant took a Torah scroll and handed it to the synagogue president, who handed it to the High Priest's deputy, who handed it to the High Priest, who handed it to the king. The king stood and received it, and was to read while seated. King Agrippa stood and received it and read standing, and the sages praised him for doing so. When Agrippa I reached the commandment of Deuteronomy 17:15 that "you may not put a foreigner over you" as king, his eyes ran with tears, but they said to him, "Don't fear, Agrippa, you are our brother, you are our brother!" The king read from Deuteronomy 1:1 up through the shema (Deuteronomy 6:4–9), and then Deuteronomy 11:13–21, the portion regarding tithes (Deuteronomy 14:22–29), the portion of the king (Deuteronomy 17:14–20), and the blessings and curses (Deuteronomy 27–28). The king would recite the same blessings as the High Priest, except that the king would substitute a blessing for the festivals instead of one for the forgiveness of sin. (Mishnah Sotah 7:8; Babylonian Talmud Sotah 41a.)

Agrippa I used his prerogative to appoint the high priests of the Temple three times during his short reign, choosing alternately from the priestly dynasties of the Anan and the Boethos. His short administration was thus placed under the domination of Rome, of which he was an instrument of control, and the marks of honor given as sovereign by the Jews to the Temple testify to the "generalized clientelism in which personal friendships administrative relations throughout the empire.

=== Regional ambitions ===
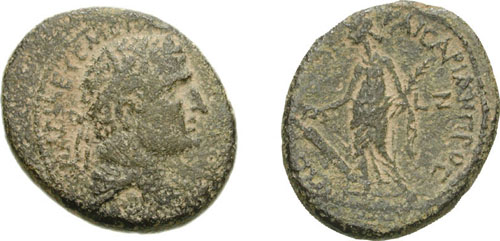
Coin minted by Herod Agrippa

Gaius Vibius Marsus, the governor of Syria who succeeded Petronius, was much less favorable to Agrippa I. He sent a series of letters to Claudius to express his fears of Agrippa I's rising power, reflecting the jealousy of the prince's Roman compatriots in the region. For his part, Agrippa I repeatedly asked the emperor to dismiss Marsus.

Marsus interrupted, on the orders of Claudius, the fortification of Jerusalem and tempered the regional diplomatic ambitions of Agrippa I. Indeed, Agrippa I invited to Tiberias Herod of Chalcis as well as three princes who had been his companions in Rome, Antiochos of Commagene, Cotys of Lesser Armenia and Polemon, king of Pontus. Marsus argued the possibility of a conspiracy. Although it is unlikely that Agrippa I considered breaking with his close Roman protectors and familiars, the kings were enjoined to return to their respective kingdoms without delay.

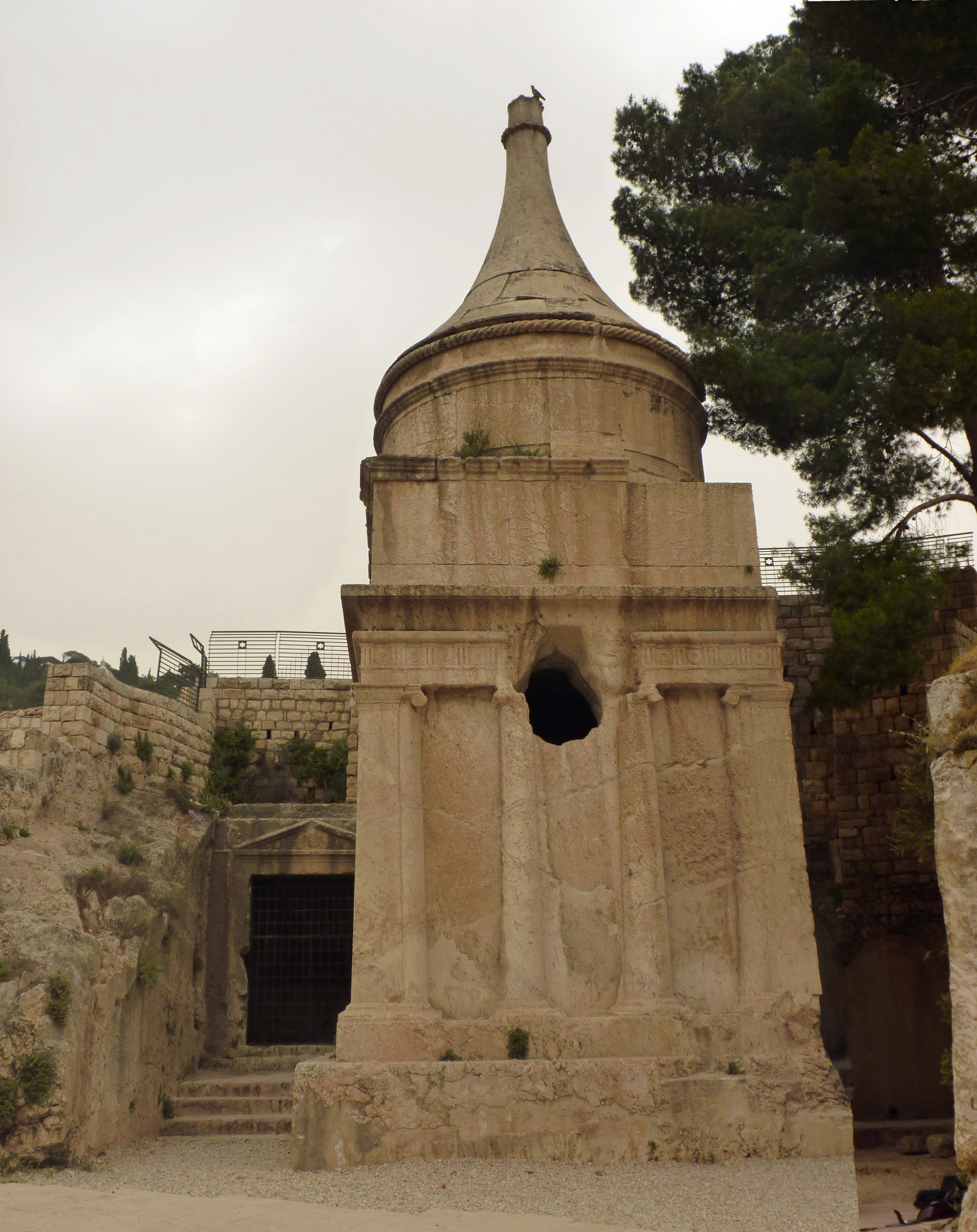
Tomb of Absalom (western facade), with the entrance to the Cave of Jehoshaphat (left) behind it; the tomb is dated to the 1st century AD. In a 2013 conference, Professor Gabriel Barkay suggested that it could be the tomb of Agrippa I, based in part on the similarity to Herod the Great's newly discovered tomb at Herodium.

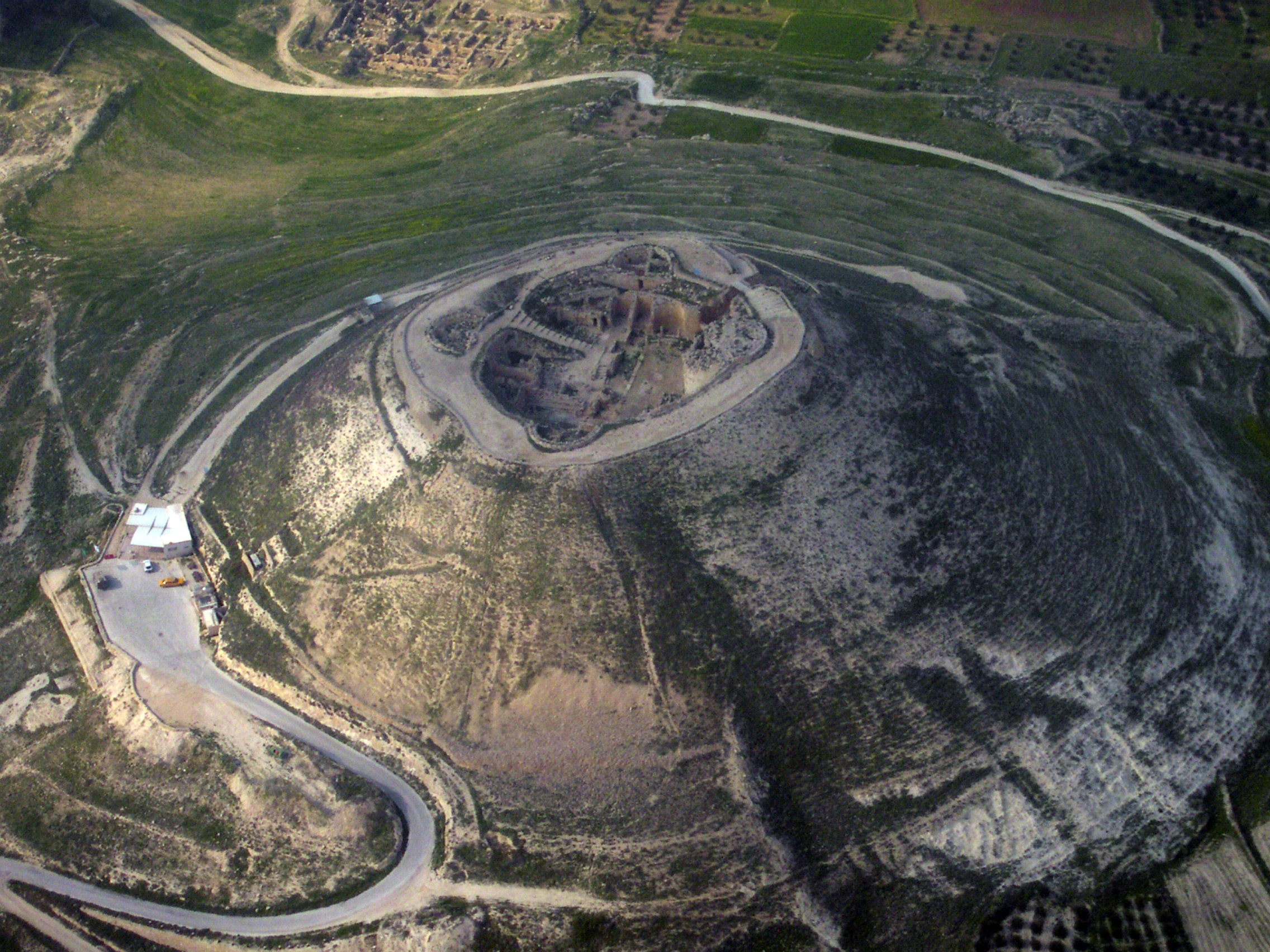
Tomb of Herod the Great at Herodium

=== Unexpected death ===
Agrippa I died unexpectedly in 44, after only three years of reign over Judaea. The precise cause of his death is unknown, but rumors of poisoning circulated. Several researchers believe that a poisoning by Romans worried about his excessive political ambitions is likely, or even that it was a personal initiative of Marsus to attenuate the hostility of the neighboring Syrian populations.

Some of Agrippa's contemporaries saw his death as a divine punishment for blasphemy. According to Acts of the Apostles, a supplicant delegation from Tyre and Sidon came to Agrippa to sue for peace. Hearing his response, the delegation said his response was as of a god. An angel immediately appeared and struck Agrippa down, with worms devouring him thereafter (Acts 12:20–23). (According to Mireille Hadas-Lebel, some sources agree that Agrippa was seized with violent abdominal pains after a similar incident and died following five days of agony, at age 53.)

According to Josephus, Agrippa died during the games of Caesarea in honor of the emperor. Patronizing the games, Agrippa appeared in dazzling silver finery in front of the crowd, who acclaimed him and compared him to a god, saying: "Be thou merciful to us; for although we have hitherto reverenced thee only as a man, yet shall we henceforth own thee as superior to mortal nature." He then looked up and saw an owl, which he took as an ill omen. With a severe pain in his belly, Agrippa then predicted his death and scolded his friends for flattering him, accepting his imminent death in a state of teshuva.

In any case, the reign of Agrippa did not last long enough take on a definitive and recorded political orientation. Nevertheless, the hopes of regained sovereignty aroused among the Jews of Judea by his accession did not disappear with his death. They were probably part of the causes that led to the Jewish revolt that broke out some 20 years later.

== Succession ==
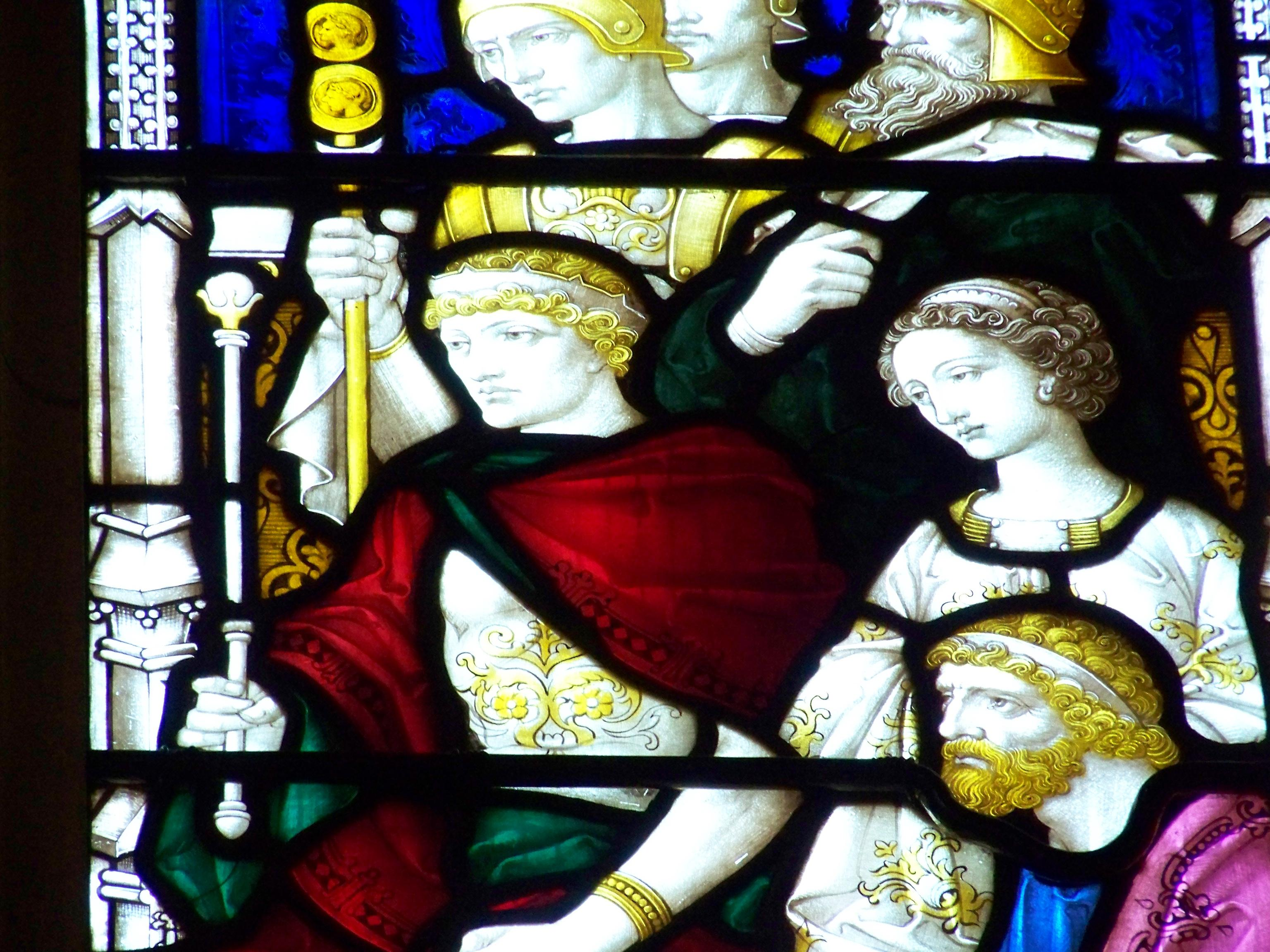
Berenice depicted with her brother Agrippa II during the trial of the apostle Paul; Stained glass window in Saint Paul's Cathedral, in Melbourne.

The death of Agrippa I was celebrated by the pagan populations of the kingdom, in particular in Caesarea and Sebaste, which the sovereign had nevertheless largely favored. The hostility of the Syrian population was also evident in attacks by Syrian auxiliaries on statues of the king's daughters adorning the palace of Caesarea.

Rather than entrusting Agrippa I's kingdom to his son Agrippa II—an inexperienced young man who grew up at the imperial court, protected by the emperor—Claudius made it a Roman province with Cuspius Fadus as procurator. This decision, along with the unruly conduct of the Syrian auxiliaries, generated renewed unrest in Caesarea and elsewhere. The appointment of the priests and the control of the Temple of Jerusalem passed to Herod of Chalcis, who also became the foremost intermediary between the Jews and the Romans until his death in 48. For the Jews, these events marked the end of hopes for even a symbolic Jewish independence, and it was then that intransigent factious movements with messianic and anti-Roman connotations appeared.

From his union with Cypros, Agrippa I had four children reaching adulthood: a son, Agrippa II, and three daughters, Berenice, Mariamne and Drusilla. Another son, Drusus, died in childhood.

== Posterity ==
Schematic family tree showing the Herods of the Bible

Half a century after Agrippa I's sudden death, Josephus evokes the sovereign in these terms: "Agrippa's character was gentle and his benevolence was equal for all. He was full of humanity for people of foreign races and also showed them his liberality, but he was also helpful for his compatriots and showed them even more sympathy". Josephus gives Agrippa a positive legacy and relates that he was known in his time as "Agrippa the Great". In the rabbinical sources, Agrippa is presented as a pious man, and his reign is described positively. Conversely, the pagan inhabitants of Caesarea and Sebaste organized rejoicings at his death.

A significant number of critics follow the Christian tradition to identify Agrippa I with "Herod the king" who, in the Acts of the Apostles, composed in 80-90 AD, persecutes the community of Jesus' disciples in Jerusalem, then who has James the Great killed "with the sword" while the apostle Peter, later arrested, owes his salvation only to the help of "an angel" who comes by night to help him escape from his prison. However, attitudes towards the historicity of the Acts of the Apostles have ranged widely across scholarship in different countries. Boismard and Lamouille argue the evangelist inserted the death of Agrippa into a Petrine document, though no sources have been conclusively identified for the Acts of the Apostles. It is therefore possible that "Herod the king" does not designate Agrippa I, but his son Agrippa II. The speech of Gamaliel, delivered seven chapters before the account of the death of Agrippa I to defend the apostles during a previous arrest, speaks of the death of Theudas intervened under the procurator Cuspius Fadus (44–46) and in the Gesture of Peter, the murder of James the Great, then the arrest and escape of Peter are later of five chapters to this speech and precedes the account of the death of Agrippa I. This account of the death of Agrippa I diverges from that of Josephus but otherwise agrees with him on the divine origin of his mortal illness, occasioned by his impious refusal to reject the deification of which he is the object by the people, perhaps testifying to the use of a common Jewish source.

== Family tree ==
Alexander; HASMONEAN DYNASTY	Alexandra
4.Malthace	Herod the Great; HERODIAN DYNASTY	2.Mariamne I d. 29 BC
Aristobulus d. 7 BC	Berenice I
Herod Archelaus	Mariamne III	Herod V	Herodias	Herod Agrippa I	Aristobulus Minor
Herod Agrippa II	Berenice II	Mariamne VI	Drusilla
Berenice III

== Portrayals ==
Herod Agrippa I is the protagonist of the Italian opera L’Agrippa tetrarca di Gerusalemme with music by Giuseppe Maria Buini and libretto by Claudio Nicola Stampa, first performed 28 August 1724 at the Teatro Ducale of Milan. Agrippa I is a major figure in the Robert Graves novel Claudius the God, as well as the BBC television adaptation I, Claudius, portrayed by James Faulkner as an adult and Michael Clements as a child. As Graves depicts Herod, he is a lifelong friend of Claudius, his most lasting and trustworthy advisor. Herod ultimately betrays their trust, raising a rebellion against Rome as the prophesied Messiah, much to the dismay of Claudius. Herod is struck down by unexplained illness, sending a final letter to Claudius seeking forgiveness.

== See also ==
- List of biblical figures identified in extra-biblical sources
- List of Hasmonean and Herodian rulers

== General sources ==
=== Ancient ===
- Flavius Josephus, The Jewish War, Livre II, XI
- Flavius Josephus, Antiquities of the Jews, livre XIX
- Cassius Dio, Histoire romaine, livres LIX et LX
- Philo, Ad Flaccum
- Acts of the Apostles, 12

=== Historians ===
- Mimouni, Simon Claude (2012). Le judaïsme ancien du VIe siècle avant notre ère au IIIe siècle de notre ère : des prêtres aux rabbins (in French). Vol. Nouvelle clio. puf. p. 968. ISBN 978-2130563969..
- Schwentzel, Christian-Georges (2011). Hérode le Grand. Paris: Pygmalion. ISBN 9782756404721..
- Schwentzel, Christian-Georges (2013). Juifs et nabatéens : Les monarchies ethniques du Proche-Orient hellénistique et romain. Rennes: Presses Universitaires de Rennes. p. 305. ISBN 978-2-7535-2229-9..
- Hadas-Lebel, Mireille (2009). "VI : Caligula, Agrippa Ier et les Juifs". Rome, la Judée et les Juifs. Paris: A. & J. Picard. p. 231. ISBN 978-2708408425..
- Goodman, Martin (2009). Rome et Jérusalem. Paris: Perrin/Tempus..
- Nikkos Kokkinos, The Herodian Dynasty: Origins, Role in Society and Eclipse, Sheffield Academic Press, Sheffield, coll. « Journal for the Study of the Pseudepigrapha Supplement Series », 1998 ISBN 1850756902.
- Kokkinos, Nikos (1989). Crucifixion in A.D. 36 : The Keystone for Dating the Birth of Jesus in Jack Finegan, Chronos, kairos, Christos: nativity and chronological studies. Jerry Vardaman & Edwin M. Yamauchi. ISBN 9780931464508..
- Schwartz, Daniel R. (1990). Agrippa I : The Last King of Judaea. Mohr Siebeck..
- Eisenman, Robert (2012). James the Brother of Jesus And The Dead Sea Scrolls, The Historical James, Paul as the Enemy, and Jesus' Brothers as Apostles, Vol. I. GDP. p. 411. ISBN 9780985599133..
- Eisenman, Robert (2012). James the Brother of Jesus And The Dead Sea Scrolls, The Damascus Code, the Tent of David, the New Covenant, and the Blood of Christ, Vol. II. GDP. p. 443. ISBN 9780985599164..
- Blanchetière, François (2001). Enquête sur les racines juives du mouvement chrétien (in French). Cerf. p. 586. ISBN 9782204062152..
- Lémonon, Jean-Pierre (2007). Ponce Pilate (in French). Atelier. ISBN 978-2-7082-3918-0..
- Grabbe, Lester L. (1992). Judaïsm from Cyrus to Hadrian, Vol. II. Fortress Press. p. 722. ISBN 0-8006-2621-4..
- Smallwood, E. Mary (1976). The Jews Under Roman Rule : From Pompey to Diocletian : A Study in Political Relations. Brill..
- Boismard, Marie-Émile; Lamouille, Arnaud (1990). Actes des deux apôtres, livre I (in French). Paris: Librairie Lecoffre J. Gabalda et Cie.

Herod Agrippa House of Herod Born: 11 BC Died: AD 44
Regnal titles
Vacant Title last held by Tetrarch Philip	King of Batanaea; AD 37 – 41	Vacant Title next held by King Herod Agrippa II
Vacant Title last held by Tetrarch Herod Antipas	King of Galilee; AD 40 – 41	Title extinct
Vacant governed by Prefect Title last held by King Herod the Great	King of Judaea; AD 41 – 44	Title extinct
