= Justus of Tiberias =

Jewish author and historian (fl. first century CE)

Justus of Tiberias (Tiberias, c. 35 AD – Galilee, c. 100 AD) was a 1st century Jewish author and historiographer. All that we know of his life comes from the Vita which Flavius Josephus apparently wrote in response to the assertions made by Justus in his History of the Jewish War, published around 93/94 or shortly after 100. Justus's works have been lost and they currently survive only in small fragments from other works.

After the Great Jewish Revolt (66–70), Justus was the secretary of King Agrippa II and waited until his death to publish his History of this revolt. He is also known as the author of two other writings which disappeared much later. Thus in the ninth century, Bishop Photios of Constantinople was still able to access a copy of the Chronicle of the Jewish Kings' written by Justus.

== Biographical elements ==
=== The Jewish Historian ===
Justus of Tiberias is a son of Pistos. Both are presented as authorities of the city of Tiberias when Flavius Josephus was governor of Galilee in 66/67. He is best known as a historiographer. None of his writings have come down to us, but three of them are mentioned by ancient authors. In his De viris illustribus (14), Jerome of Stridon mentions one of them which he calls Commentarioli de scriptura, a commentary on the biblical writings, corresponding to what Christians calls the Old Testament. He wrote a Chronicle of the Jewish Kings, which Bishop Photios of Constantinople could still consult in the ninth century But the writing that makes us know it, although it seems to have disappeared almost immediately, is his History of the Jewish War, by the reaction it provoked in Flavius Josephus.

=== Justus accused of being responsible for the revolt ===
In response to the Justus's History, Josephus indeed published his Vita in order to counter various assertions which told a very different story from what the latter had published in his Jewish War twenty years earlier. He attacks Justus at length, even though he had not even mentioned him — nor his father Pistos — in The Jewish War written twenty years earlier. Most of what we know about Justus, moreover, comes from a long digression by Josephus who attacks him in this Vita (336–367). He criticizes him for multiplying the errors — but without citing any explicitly — and for “not having had access, unlike him, to the field notes of Vespasian and Titus".

However, despite Josephus' efforts to blame Justus for the uprising in Galilee, several facts he mentions in his Vita contradict this accusation. Thus, Justus was opposed to the destruction of Herod's palace in Tiberias, whereas on the contrary Josephus tried to obtain its destruction from the Council of the city. Josephus himself says that Justus was not a member of the pro-war faction, but the leader of a faction in intermediate positions. It is also possible that this third party is an invention of Josephus who could not make Justus the leader of the revolutionary party because it was far too well known that its leader was Jesus son of Sapphia. Some of Justus' close relatives were also killed by the revolutionaries in Gamla. Furthermore, Josephus states that he took him prisoner along with all the members of the council of Tiberias, because due to the invincibility of the Romans, this council had secretly pledged allegiance to King Agrippa and demanded that he send forces to take control of the city. Josephus would then have released them, recommending that they show duplicity because if he was well aware of the invincibility of the Romans, they had to pretend to support the war against Rome because of the "brigands" (lestai) (Note: "When I arrived at Tarichea, I made my prisoners come to dine with me, between whom were Justus and Pistus, his father, and told them that I knew like them what was the power of the Romans; but that the large number of rebels prevented me from showing my feelings, [176] and that I advised them to remain like me in silence, while waiting for a better time; that, however, they must have been very glad to have me as their governor, since no one else could treat them better." cf. Flavius Josephus, Autobiographie, § 175-176.) Josephus appropriates here “the discriminatory vocabulary of the Romans. On several occasions in The Jewish War, he calls "brigands" the Jewish rebels, such as the Sicarii, the Zealots or the members of the Fourth philosophy. For Shaye J. D. Cohen, those who are called “brigands” in this passage were Josephus' own followers at the material time. Finally, even before Vespasian's offensive in Galilee (spring 67), Justus was no longer in Tiberias, but had joined King Agrippa in Beirut when the latter was going to join his army with Vespasian's three legions to begin the reconquest of all of Palestine, starting with Galilee.

After the Great Jewish Revolt (66-70), he was imperial secretary at the court of Agrippa, king of Batanea and the eastern part of Galilee (Vita 356).

=== Accusations of forgery ===
Josephus compares Justus and all the historians who lie "out of hatred or partiality" to "forgers who fabricate false contracts (V § 337)". Then in the long digression in which Josephus attacks Justus (V 356), he suggests that if Agrippa drove Justus away and forbade him to "appear ever before him" from an indefinite moment, it was because he would have realized that he was being dishonest “in the office of secretary with which he [had] honored him." For Shaye J. D. Cohen, “Josephus labels Justus as a forger, an accusation sometimes leveled against official secretaries,” which goes back to the comparison he made in § 337 between those who lie to fabricate a false story – as Justus, according to him, did – and "forgers who fabricate false contracts". However, Josephus ends this passage by saying that “about all this [he] renounces to prove everything down to the detail".

It was only after Agrippa's death that Justus published his History of the Jewish War, which triggered the writing of the Vita' of Flavius Josephus. The dates of publication of these two writings depend on the date of the death of Agrippa which occurs either in 92/93, or in 100. See on this subject the § Date of the death of Agrippa in the item Agrippa II.

After the publication of the Autobiography of Flavius Josephus, the two men disappear from history.

== Justus' History of the Jewish War ==
Justus' book about the Great Jewish revolt was an account of the war (Vita 336 and 338) which included the campaign in Galilee, the actions of Josephus and which challenged his version of the siege of Jotapata (Vita 357). He also recounted the siege of Jerusalem (Vita 358).

He also apparently disputed Josephus' version about Philip of Bathyra and what had happened in Gamala and Batanea. It is mainly on these subjects that Josephus endeavors to answer at length, whereas he devotes only one sentence to answering the disputes of Justus about the siege of Iotapata - of which Josephus claims to have directed the defense - and to the about Josephus' version of the events that took place during the siege of Jerusalem (V 357-358).

=== Disputing the veracity of the story told by Josephus ===
In his book, Justus declared to tell a superior story to those already published which took care to respect the historical facts. According to Josephus, he thus contradicted the memoirs of Vespasian (Vita 358). He “falsely testified” against Josephus (Vita 338). The Vita of § 357 to 367 also implies that Justus was attacking the veracity of the Jewish War on certain points.

== Works ==
Justus's works have been lost and they currently survive only in small fragments from other works: Justus is the author of a War of the Jews, probably written in Greek, which he only publishes after the death of Agrippa (92 ou 100) whom he presents in an unfavorable light. This work is mentioned by Eusebius of Caesarea and Jerome. of Stridon, but indirectly, Flavius having probably worked for the disappearance of the work of his rival.

He is also the author of a Chronicle of the Jewish Kings from Moses to Agrippa II, briefly summarized by Photius. Photius of Constantinople describes it as being written in sketchy forms. It is likely that several later authors used this material in their own works, such as Sextus Julius Africanus, Eusebius, Diogenes Laërtius; and the Byzantine historian George Syncellus. Commenting this Chronicle, Photios laments that Justus failed to make any mention of Jesus of Nazareth.

According to Jerome, Justus also wrote a Brief commentary of the Holy Scriptures, but no other references of that work survives and it is unclear whether it was an authentic work or a pseudoepigrapha.

== General sources ==
- Josephus, Flavius (2001). Mason, Steve (ed.). Life of Josephus : Translation and Commentary. Vol. 9. Translated by Mason, Steve. Leiden, Boston, Köln: Brill. p. 293. ISBN 90-04-11793-8.
- Flavius, Josephus (1977). La guerre des Juifs (in French). Translated by Savinel, Pierre. Paris: Les Éditions de Minuit. ISBN 2-7073-0135-3.
- Flavius, Josephus (1959). Autobiographie (in French). Vol. Collection des Universités de France « Budé », série grecque. Translated by Pelletier, André. Paris: Les Belles-Lettres. p. 79.
- Cohen, Shaye J. D. (2002). Josephus in Galilee and Rome : His Vita and Development As a Historian. Brill. p. 277. ISBN 0-391-04158-4.
- Josephus, Flavius (1959). Autobiographie (in French). Translated by Pelletier, André. Paris: Les Belles-Lettres. p. 79.
- Schwentzel, Christian-Georges (2011). Hérode le Grand (in French). Paris: Pygmalion. p. 321. ISBN 978-2-7564-0472-1.
- Mimouni, Simon Claude (2012). Le judaïsme ancien du VIe siècle avant notre ère au IIIe siècle de notre ère : des prêtres aux rabbins (in French). Paris: puf. p. 968. ISBN 978-2-13-056396-9..
- Eisenman, Robert (2012). James the Brother of Jesus And The Dead Sea Scrolls, The Historical James, Paul as the Enemy, and Jesus' Brothers as Apostles. Vol. I. Grave Distractions Publications. p. 411. ISBN 978-0-9855991-3-3. Eisenman 2012..
- Eisenman, Robert (2012). James the Brother of Jesus And The Dead Sea Scrolls, The Damascus Code, the Tent of David, the New Covenant, and the Blood of Christ. Vol. II. Grave Distractions Publications. p. 443. ISBN 978-0-9855991-6-4. Eisenman 2012..
- Josephus, Flavius; Mason, Steve (2001). Steve Mason (ed.). Life of Josephus : Translation and Commentary (in English and Ancient Greek). Vol. 9. Translated by Feldman, Louis H. Leiden, Boston, Köln: Brill. p. 293. ISBN 90-04-11793-8..
- Josephus, Flavius; Whiston, William (2008). The Life of Flavius Josephus. Translated by Whiston, Willian. The Floating Press. p. 106. ISBN 978-1-77541-202-1..
- Pergola, Philippe (1978). La condamnation des Flaviens chrétiens sous Domitien : Persécution religieuse ou répression à caractère politique ?. 90 (in French). Vol. Mélanges de l'École française de Rome. Paris: École Française de Rome. pp. 407–423. doi:10.3406/mefr.1978.1152..
- Schwartz, Seth (1990). Josephus and Judaean Politics. Leiden - New-York - Köln: E. J. Brill. p. 263. ISBN 90-04-09230-7..
- Sartre, Maurice (1985). Bostra : des origines à l'Islam (in French). Paris: Librairie Orientaliste Paul Geuthner. p. 279. ISBN 9782705302702..
- Théron, Bernard (1981). "Les Flaviens dans " La guerre des Juifs " de Flavius Josephus". Dialogues d'Histoire Ancienne. 7. Dialogues d'histoire ancienne. Paris: 235–245. doi:10.3406/dha.1981.1433. ISSN 1955-270X..
- Blanchetière, François (2001). Enquête sur les racines juives du mouvement chrétien (in French). Cerf. p. 586. ISBN 978-2-204-06215-2..
- Grabbe, Lester L. (1992). Judaïsm from Cyrus to Hadrian. Vol. II. Fortress Press. p. 722. ISBN 0-8006-2621-4..
- de Naplouse, Justin; Munier, Charles (2006). Apologie pour les Chrétiens (in French and Ancient Greek). Translated by Munier, Charles. Paris: Édition du Cerf. p. 391. ISBN 978-2-204-08254-9. Justin traduit par Charles Munier..
- Théron, Bernard (1981). "Les Flaviens dans " La guerre des Juifs " de Flavius Josephus". Dialogues d'Histoire Ancienne. 7. Dialogues d'histoire ancienne. Paris: 235–245. doi:10.3406/dha.1981.1433. ISSN 1955-270X..
- Burgeon, Christophe (2017). Domitien : un empereur controversé (in French). Louvain-la-Neuve (Belgique): Academia. p. 192. ISBN 978-2-8061-0373-4..
- Hadas-Lebel, Mireille (2013). Hillel, un sage au temps de Jésus. Paris: Albin Michel. p. 192. ISBN 978-2-226-29134-9..
- Jones, Kenneth (2011). Jewish Reactions to the Destruction of Jerusalem in A.D. 70 : Apocalypses and Related Pseudepigrapha. Leiden: Brill. p. 305. ISBN 978-90-04-21027-1..
- Pastor, Jack; Stern, Pnina; Mor, Menahem (2011). Flavius Josephus : interpretation and history. Leiden: Brill. p. 438. ISBN 978-90-04-19126-6..
- Schürer, Emil; Millar, Fergus; Verme, Geza (2014). The History of the Jewish People in the Age of Jesus Christ. Vol. 1. Londres & New-York: A&C Black. p. 624. ISBN 978-0-567-50161-5..
- Frankfort, Thérèse (1961). La date de l'Autobiographie de Flavius Josephus et des œuvres de Justus de Tibériade. 39 (in French). Vol. Revue belge de Philologie et d'Histoire. Bruxelles: Société pour le Progrès des Études Philologiques et Historiques. pp. 52–58. doi:10.3406/rbph.1961.2353. ISSN 2295-9068. S2CID 161805058..
- Seyrig, Henri (1965). "Antiquités syriennes : Un officier d'Agrippa II". Syria. Archéologie, Art et Histoire. 42 (in French). Syria. Archéologie, Art et histoire (1). Paris: Institut français du Proche-Orient: 25–34. doi:10.3406/syria.1965.5811. ISSN 2076-8435..
