= Christian-Georges Schwentzel =

French historian

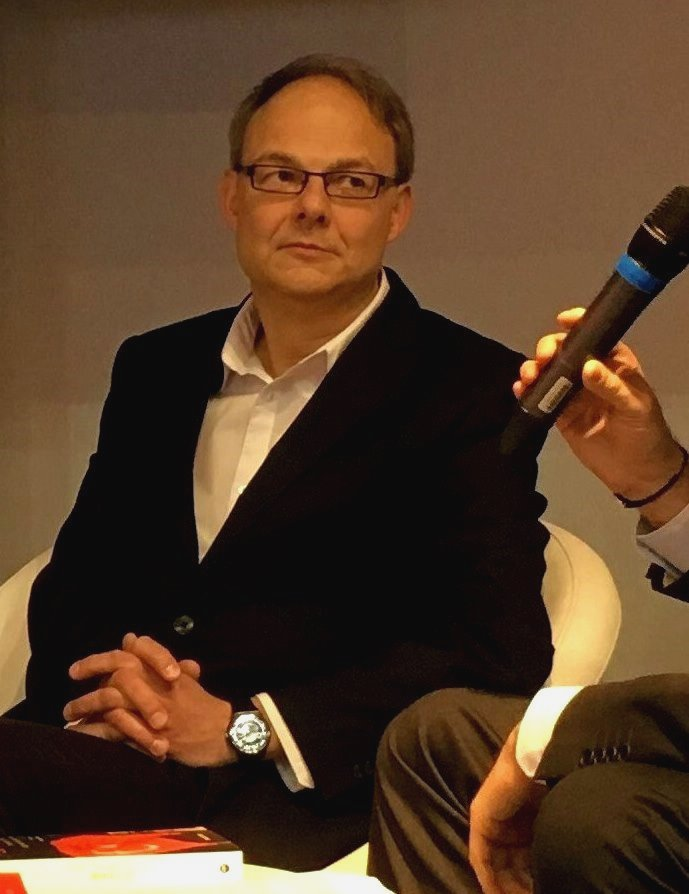
Schwentzel in 2017

Christian-Georges Schwentzel, born in 1967, is a French historian specializing in the Hellenistic East.

== Publications ==
- Cléopâtre, Paris, PUF, 1999.
- L'Égypte hellénistique et romaine (avec Bertrand Lançon), Paris, Nathan, 1999 (réédition, 2003).
- Les Pharaons d'Égypte, de Narmer à Cléopâtre, Milan, Les Essentiels Milan, 2002.
- L'Orient méditerranéen à l'époque hellénistique, Paris, éditions du Temps, 2003.
- Étrangers dans la cité romaine. Habiter une autre patrie : des incolae de la République aux peuples fédérés du Bas-Empire (avec R. Compatangelo-Soussignan), Rennes, Presses Universitaires de Rennes, 2005.
- Hérode le Grand, Juifs et Romains, Salomé et Jean-Baptiste, Titus et Bérénice, Paris, Pygmalion, 2011, 324 pages (recension ).
- La puissance royale. Image et pouvoir de l'Antiquité au Moyen Age (avec E. Santinelli-Foltz), Rennes, Presses Universitaires de Rennes, 2012.
- Les diasporas grecques. viiie – iiie siècles (avec M. Dana, S. Lebreton et Fr. Prêteux), Paris, Atlande, 2012.
- Juifs et Nabatéens, les monarchies ethniques du Proche-Orient hellénistique et romain, Rennes, Presses Universitaires de Rennes, 2013, 310 pages.
- Rois et reines de Judée. IIe s. av.-Ier s. apr. J.-C., Paris, Lemme edit, 2013.
- Le monde romain (avec L. Lamoine et B.Pichon), Paris, SEDES-Armand Colin, 2014.
- Cléopâtre, la déesse-reine, Biographie Paris, Payot, 2014, 350 pages.
- Les dieux et le pouvoir : aux origines de la théocratie (avec Marie-Françoise Baslez), Rennes, Presses Universitaires de Rennes, 2016, 180 pages.
- La Fabrique des chefs : d'Akhenaton à Donald Trump, Paris, Vendémiaire, 2017, 290 pages.
- Les Quatre Saisons du Christ : un parcours politique dans la Judée romaine, Paris, Vendémiaire, 2018, 260 pages.
- Le Nombril d'Aphrodite : une histoire érotique de l'Antiquité, Paris, Payot, 2019, 272 pages.
- Manuel du parfait dictateur : Jules César et les « hommes forts » du XXIe siècle, Paris, Vendémiaire, 2021, 246 pages.
- Cléopâtre : une dynastie de femmes puissantes, Paris, Frémeaux et associés, 2021, livre audio.
- Cléopâtre, collection "Biographies", Paris, PUF, 2022.
