= Pierre Maraval =

French historian (1936–2021)

Pierre Maraval (31 August 1936 – 6 March 2021) was a French historian and academic, specialising in the Early Christianity (c. 31/33–324) and of Late antiquity.

== Life ==
=== Youth and training ===
Born into a modest family in Roquecourbe, Maraval inherited from his mother, who was very pious, a religious commitment that led him to the minor seminary. He briefly entered a monastery in which he worked as a librarian.

Maraval graduated in Catholic theology in 1964, and taught patristics at the Redemptorists' studendat in Dreux from 1967 to 1970. At the same time, he was invited to the Academie Alfonsiana, at the Pontifical Lateran University in Rome, but confirmed his taste for ancient languages. He defended a thesis in 1971 on Gregory of Nyssa's Vie de sainte Macrine, the text of which he established before translating and commenting on it, under the direction of the Hellenist Marguerite Harl.

In 1974, Maraval was agrégé des lettres and doctor d'Etat in 1983. In 1985, he defended a new thesis in history entitled Lieux saints et pèlerinages d'Orient. Histoire et géographie des origines à la conquête arabe

=== University career ===
Maraval was maître-assistant and professor at the Marc Bloch University from 1971 to 1998, professor at Paris-Sorbonne University from 1998 to 2004, then emeritus of the same university.

A member of the Société des Antiquaires de France, the French Committee for Byzantine Studies and the Association for Late Antiquity, he was a visiting scholar in several European and North American universities and a member of the editorial board of a number of academic journals. He was also director of the Centre for Patristic Analysis and Documentation between 1987 and 1995.

Maraval died in Toulouse at the age of 84.

== Awards ==
- Prix François-Millepierres of the Académie française (2010).
- Doctorat honoris causa of the Université catholique de Louvain (2008).
- Commandeur de l'ordre des Palmes académiques.

== Publications ==
- Grégoire de Nysse, Vie de sainte Macrine, editing and translation, Paris, Éditions du Cerf, 1971 (Sources Chrétiennes, No. 178).
- Égérie, Journal de voyage (Itinéraire), editing and translation, Paris, Cerf, 1982 (Sources Chrétiennes, No. 296).
- Lieux saints et pèlerinages d'Orient. Histoire et géographie des origines à la conquête arabe, Paris, Cerf, 1985; 2004; Cerf/CNRS 2011.
- La Passion inédite de S. Athénogène de Pédachthoé en Cappadoce, editing and translation, Brussels, Société des Bollandistes, 1990.
- Grégoire de Nysse, Lettres, editing and translation, Paris, Cerf, 1990 ("Sources Chrétiennes", No. 363).
- Procope de Césarée, Histoire secrète, annotated translation, Paris, Les Belles-Lettres, 1990, 2000.
- Les persécutions des chrétiens pendant les quatre premiers siècles, Paris, Desclée, 1992.
- Petite vie de Saint-Jérôme, Paris, Desclée, 1998.
- Récits des premiers pèlerins chrétiens au Proche-Orient, IV - VII, annotated translation, Paris, Cerf, 1996.
- Le christianisme de Constantin à la conquête arabe, Paris, PUF, Nouvelle Clio, 1997.
- L'empereur Justinien, Paris, PUF (series Que sais-je ?), 1999 CNRS Éditions, 2012.
- Eusèbe de Césarée, La théologie politique de l’empire chrétien. Louanges de Constantin, traduction annotée, Paris, Cerf, 2001.
- Socrate de Constantinople. Histoire Ecclésiastique, editing and translation, 4 volumes, Paris, Cerf, 2004-2007 ("Sources Chrétiennes", No. 477, 493, 505, 506).
- Le christianisme des origines à Constantin, Paris, PUF, Nouvelle Clio, 2006 (in collaboration with Simon Claude Mimouni).
- Agathias, Histoires. Guerres et malheurs du temps sous Justinien, annotated translation, Paris, Les Belles-Lettres, 2007.
- Théodose le Grand. Le pouvoir et la foi, Paris, Fayard, 2009.
- Actes et Passions des martyrs chrétiens des premiers siècles, traduction annotée, Paris, Cerf, 2010.
- Discours et Lettres de Constantin, annotated translation, Paris, Les Belles-Lettres, 2010.
- Constantin le Grand, Paris, Éditions Tallandier, 2011, 2014.
- Les fils de Constantin, Paris, CNRS Éditions, 2013.
- Grégoire de Nysse, Éloge de Grégoire le Thaumaturge, Éloge de Basile, editing and translation, Paris, Cerf, 2014.
- Justinien. Le rêve d'un empire chrétien universel, Paris, Éditions Tallandier, 2016.
- Alexandre le Grand et les brahmanes (Palladios d'Hélénopolis, La vie des brahmanes; Collatio Alexandri et Dindimi), translation, Paris, Les Belles-Lettres, 2016.
- Grégoire de Nysse, Lettre canonique, lettre sur la pythonisse et six homélies pastorales, editing and translation, Paris, Cerf, 2017 (Sources Chrétiennes, No. 588).
