= Jean-Pierre Lémonon =

French priest, theologian and exegete

Jean-Pierre Lémonon (born in 1940) is a French priest, theologian and exegete. He is a specialist in the New Testament and in the history of the first century of the Church. He taught theology at the Catholic University of Lyon where he was dean of the faculty of theology.

He took part in the series of programs by Gérard Mordillat and Jérôme Prieur on the birth of Christianity, Corpus Christi (1997-1998), then L'Origine du Christianisme (2003), which caused a great stir in France and Germany after their first broadcast on the Arte channel.

== Published works ==
- Pilate et le gouvernement de la Judée - Textes et monuments, Paris, Gabalda, coll. « Etudes bibliques », 1981 ISBN 978-2850210037;
- With Jean Comby, Rome face à Jérusalem. Regards des auteurs grecs et latins, Paris, Cerf, coll. « Documents autour de la Bible », 1992 ISBN 2-204-04525-X;
- Les Épîtres de Paul, II. Romains - Galates, Paris, Bayard, coll. « Commentaires », 1996;
- L'Esprit saint, Ivry-sur-Seine, L'Atelier, coll. « Tout simplement », 1998;
- Avec Hugues Cousin et et Jean Massonnet, Le Monde où vivait Jésus, Paris, Cerf, coll. « Dictionnaires », 1998 ISBN 9782204056861;
- Editeur scientifique, avec Philippe Abadie, Le Judaïsme à l'aube de l'ère chrétienne. XVIII congrès de l'ACFEB (Lyon, septembre 1999), Paris, Cerf, 2001;
- Les Débuts du christianisme, Ivry-sur-Seine, L'Atelier, coll. « Tout simplement », 2003;
- Les judéo-chretiens, des témoins oubliés, Cerf, coll. « Cahier Evangile, n°134 », 2006;
- Ponce Pilate, Ivry-sur-Seine, L'Atelier, 2007;
- L'Épître aux Galates, Paris, Cerf, coll. « Commentaire biblique, n°9 », 2008;
- Pour lire la Lettre aux Galates, Paris, Cerf et Médiaspaul, 2017; ISBN 978-2204096782;
- Pour lire la première lettre aux Corinthiens, Paris, Cerf, 2017;
- Pour lire l'évangile selon saint Jean, Paris, Cerf, 2020 ISBN 978-2204137317;
- Le Christ de Paul : Paul a-t-il cru en la divinité de Jésus ?, Paris, Médiaspaul, coll. « Paul apôtre, n°8 », 2022 ISBN 978-2712216153;
