= Justin Taylor (priest) =

New Zealand Marist priest (1943–2026)

- Born: 26 August 1943; Wellington, New Zealand
- Died: 6 January 2026 (aged 82); Herne Bay, New Zealand
- Education: University of Cambridge (BA); Downing College (PhD)
- Occupation: Priest

Justin Taylor (26 August 1943 – 6 January 2026) was a New Zealand Marist priest and historian.

Taylor was a longtime professor at the École Biblique in Jerusalem and wrote several works on the history of Christianity.

Taylor died in Herne Bay on 6 January 2026, at the age of 82.

== Publications ==
- Actes des deux apôtres (2000)
- Flavius-Josèphe : l'homme et l'historien (2000)
- Le Judéo-christianisme dans tous ses états (2001)
- L'Autorité de l'écriture (2002)
- Essai sur l'origine du christianisme (2002)
- D'où vient le christianisme ?
