= Marie-Françoise Baslez =

French historian and academic (1946–2022)

- Born: Marie-Françoise Garnier; 5 May 1946; Angers, France
- Died: 29 January 2022 (aged 75); Paris, France
- Education: École normale supérieure de jeunes filles Paris 1 Panthéon-Sorbonne University
- Occupations: Historian; Professor

Marie-Françoise Baslez (née Garnier, 5 May 1946 – 29 January 2022) was a French historian and academic. She specialized in Hellenistic Judaism and primitive Christianity and the persecution faced by the two religious groups.

== Biography ==
Baslez was born on 5 May 1946 in Angers and took preparatory classes in Versailles before enrolling at the École normale supérieure de jeunes filles in 1966. After earning an agrégation in history, she defended her thesis under the direction of the Hellenist André Laronde. She then taught at the École normale supérieure for nearly 15 years and subsequently from Rennes 2 University and Paris-East Créteil University. She was then elected a professor at Sorbonne University, where she taught the history of ancient Christianity.

Baslez's work focused on ancient Christianity, ancient Greek novels, and the history of the Jewish religion in the Greek language. She particularly applied the relation between Hellenism and Judaism, from the translation of the Septuagint to the emergence of Christianity. She analyzed the phenomenon of religious persecution and violence, as well as the structures of religious communities.

A member of the Association catholique française pour l'étude de la Bible, Baslez published numerous books and articles and edited Les premiers temps de l'Église for Éditions Gallimard. A professor at Paris-Sorbonne University, she directed a seminar at the École normale supérieure titled "Religions et sociétés dans le monde gréco-romain".

Baslez died in Paris on 29 January 2022, at the age of 75.

== Books ==
- L'étranger dans la Grèce antique (1984)
- Saint-Paul (1991)
- Bible et histoire : Judaïsme, hellénisme, christianisme (1998)
- Les sources littéraires de l'histoire grecque (2003)
- Histoire politique du monde grec antique (2004)
- Les persécutions dans l'Antiquité : Victimes, héros, martyres (2007)
- Saint Paul : Artisan d'un monde chrétien (2008)
- Comment notre monde est devenu chrétien (2008)
- Les Premiers bâtisseurs de l'Église : Correspondances épiscopales (IIe-IIIe siècles) (2016)
- Jésus : Dictionnaire historique des évangiles (2017)
- Comment les chrétiens sont devenus catholiques : I er-Ve siècles (2019)
- L’Église à la maison : Histoire des premières communautés chrétiennes (Ier-IIIe siècle) (2021)

== Awards ==
- Prix Diane-Potier-Boès (1992)
- Prix Chateaubriand (2007)
- Prix François-Millepierres (2017)
