= Batanaea =

Classical-era region of the Levant

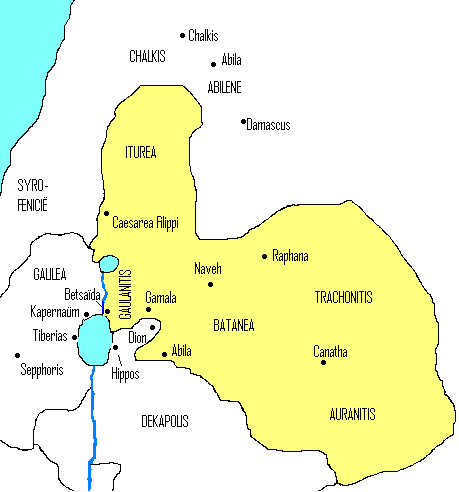
The tetrarchy of Philip (4 BCE - 34 AD), then kingdom of Herod Agrippa I (37 - 44 AD) and Herod Agrippa II (53 - 100 AD): Iturea, Trachonitis, Gaulanitis, Batanea and Auranitis

Batanaea or Batanea was an area often mentioned between the first century BCE and the fourth century CE. It is often mixed with the biblical Bashan, the part of the Biblical Holy Land, northeast of the Jordan River, as its Latinized form.

Bashan was, in biblical context, the whole region east of the Jordan, above Gadara and Abila until the Jabal al-Druze, the old Hauran (Bashan) mountains.

== History ==
Bataneaea was one of the four post-exile divisions of the area of Bashan. Today, as it was during Greco-Roman times, Batanaea is more commonly considered to be the area west of the Leja.

The region south of the Leja and west of the Hauran (Auranitis) called Nuqrah to the southwestern edge of the Leja is sometimes falsely called Batanaea. This is because of the permanent mix with the name of the Basan/Bashan region. The biblical Bashan/Basan was the whole area from Adra (Deraa) at its ancient capital to the Hauran mountains. Its highest peak may be the Hill of Basan referenced in Psalm 68:15.

In the 1st century BCE, the land was acquired by Herod the Great, who established a community of Jews from Babylon who were brought to Batanaea for the purpose of maintaining order against the banditry of the Trachonites. Upon Herod's death in 4 BCE, Batanaea passed to his son Philip as part of his inheritance. In some sources, Philip is referred to as the "Tetrarch of Batanea" with the capital at Caesarea Philippi, although his lands were more extensive than this.

On Philip's death in 34 AD, Batanea briefly became part of the Roman province of Syria, but in 37 AD it was established as a kingdom and passed to king Herod Agrippa I, and then in 53 AD to his son, king Herod Agrippa II. Following his death in 100 AD, it was once again annexed to the Roman province of Syria.

== New Testament ==
D. A. Carson, in his commentary on the Gospel of John, says that the "Bethany across the Jordan" of John 1:28 is actually Batanaea, transliterated from Aramaic to Greek. It is thus distinct from the other, more prominent Bethany in the gospels. This contradicts the general consensus, which is that Bethany across the Jordan is situated on the Jordan River near Jericho, on either the east or west bank of the river.

== Maps ==
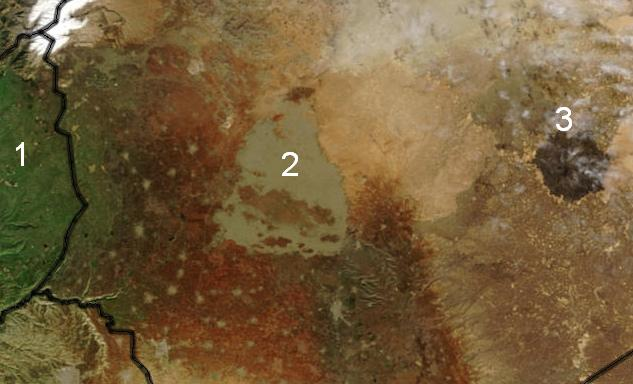

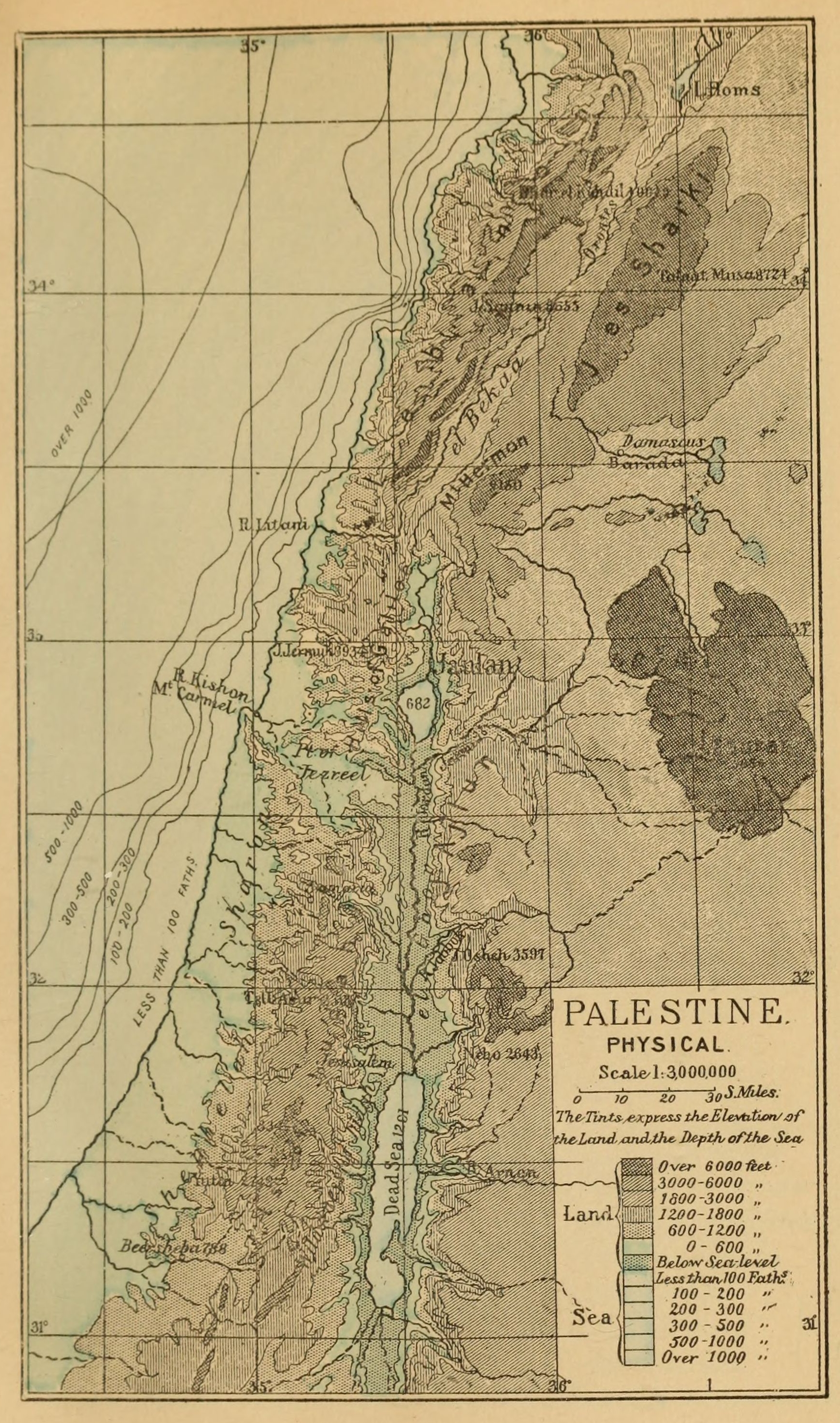

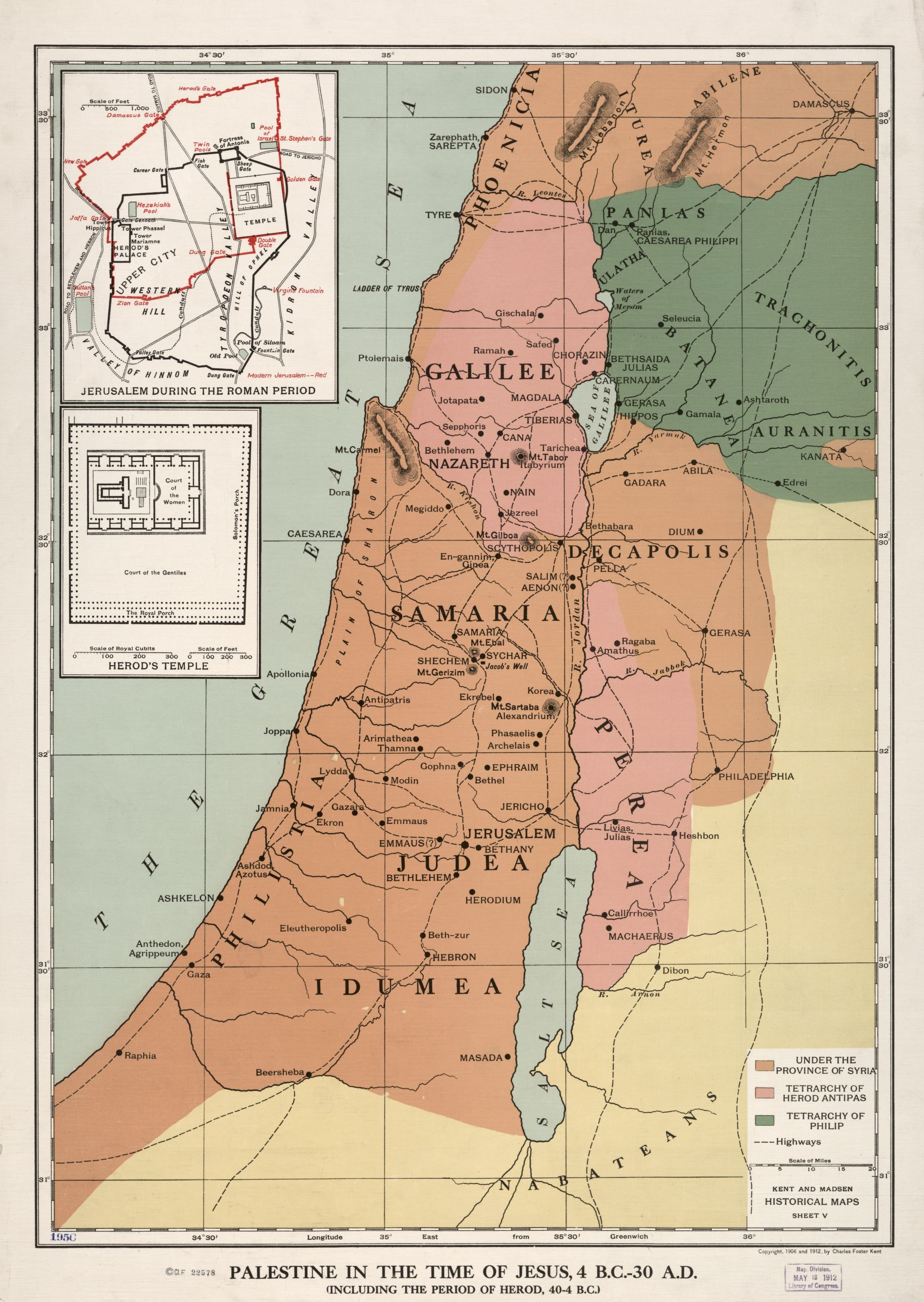
Theological map

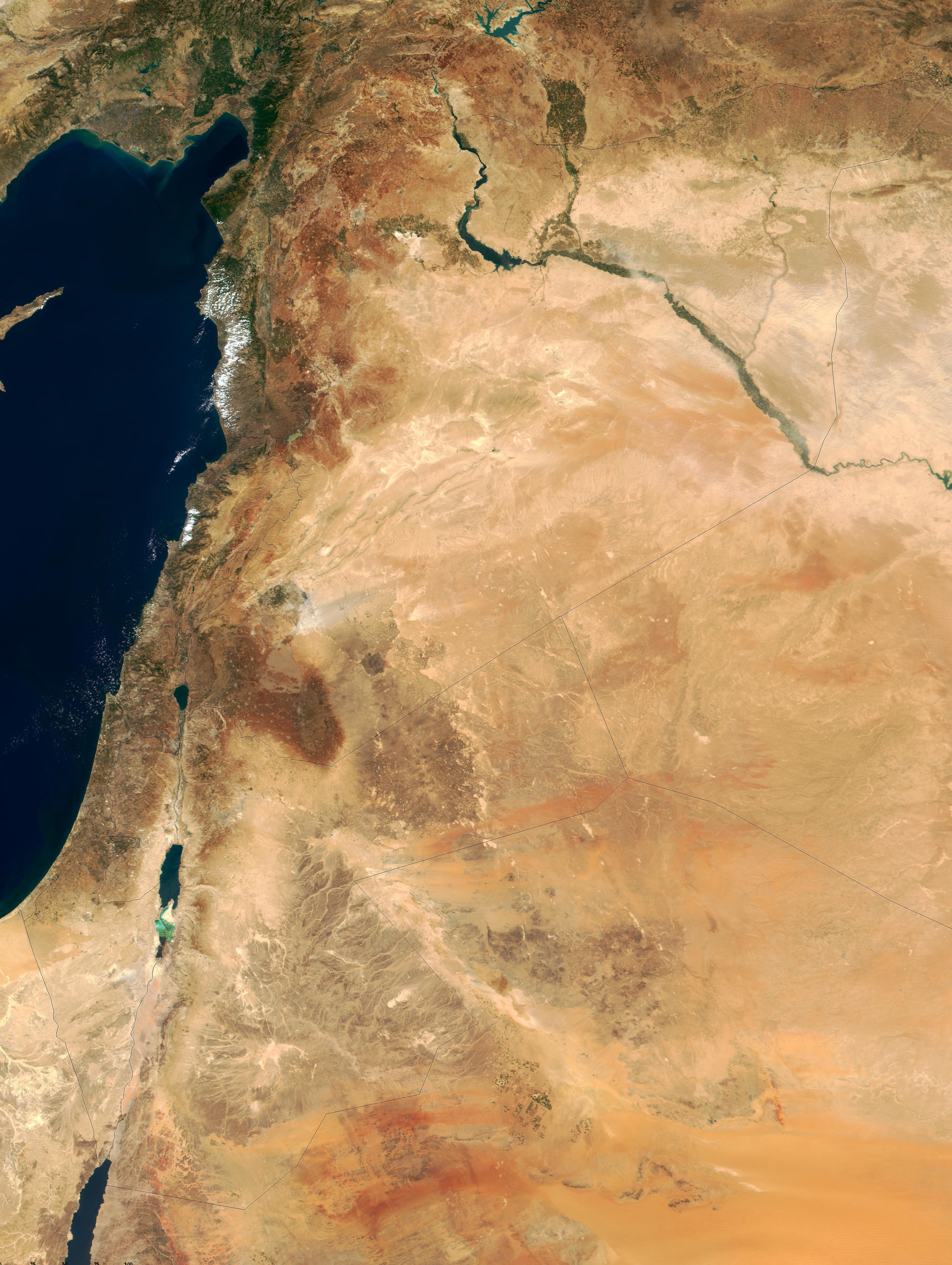

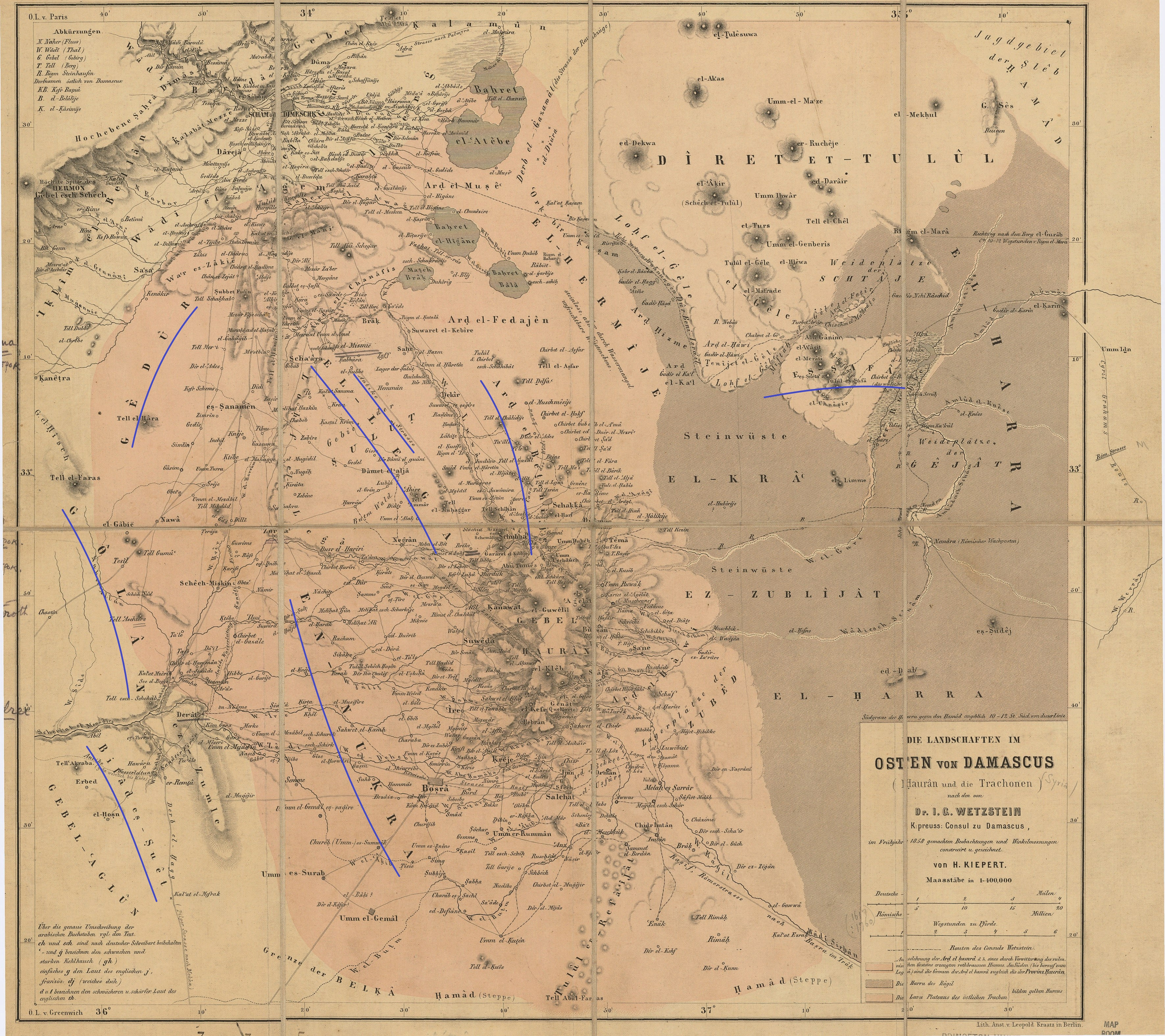
The regions east of Damascus, by Kiepert after Consul Wetzstein, 1860

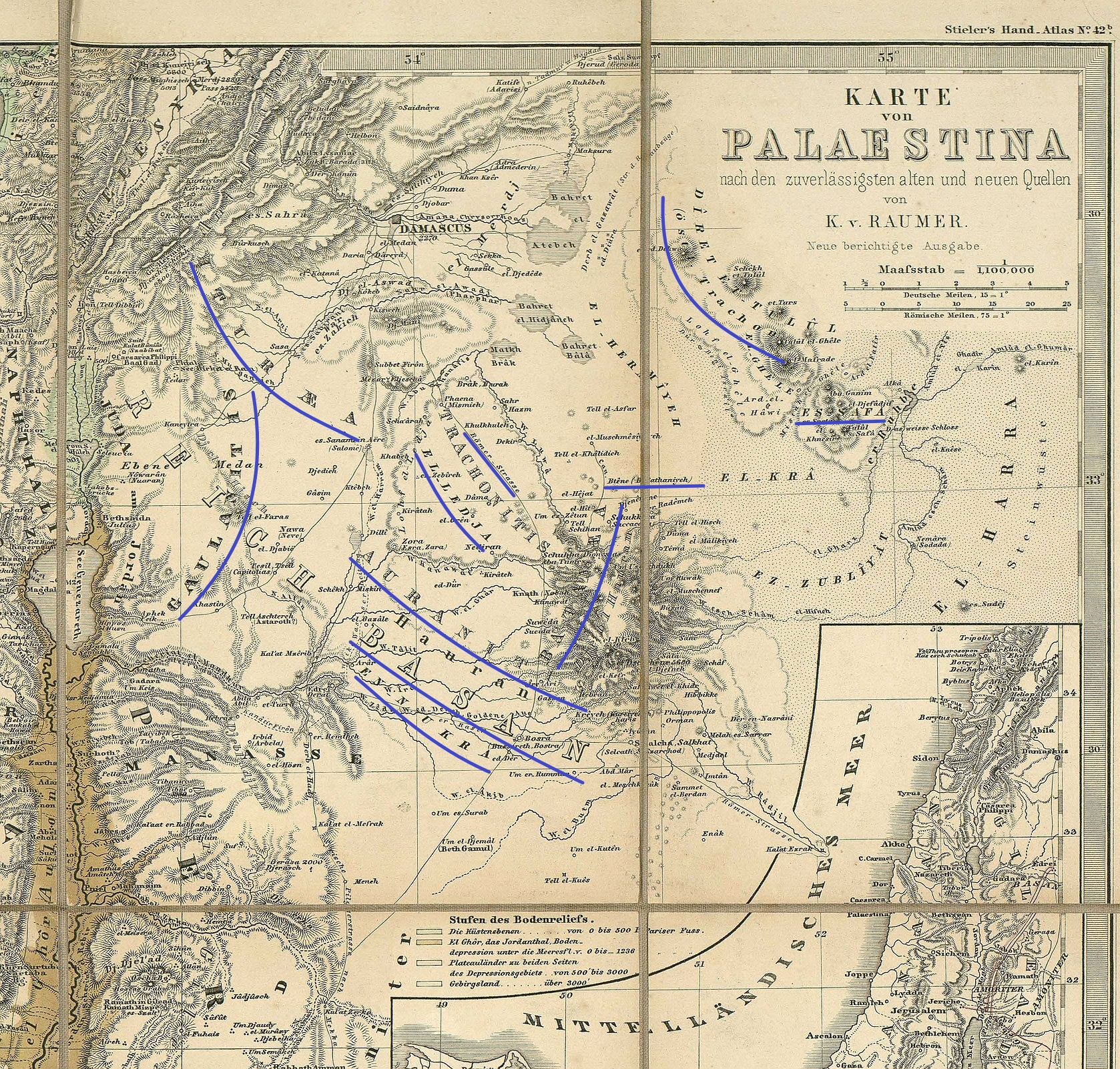
Map of Palestine, 1868, by K.v. Raumer

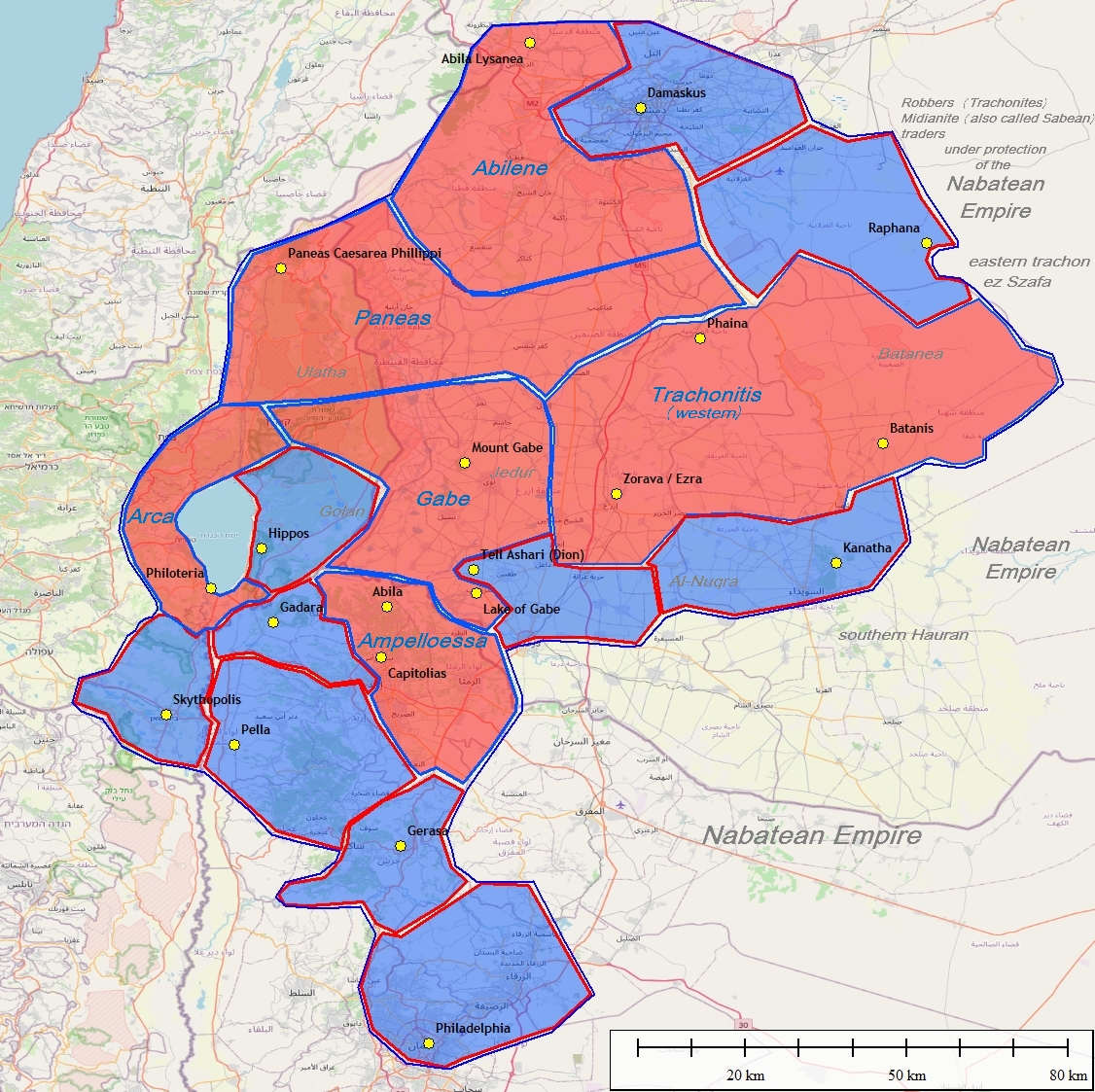
Map with the regions of the Decapolis between the first century BC and the late first century AD

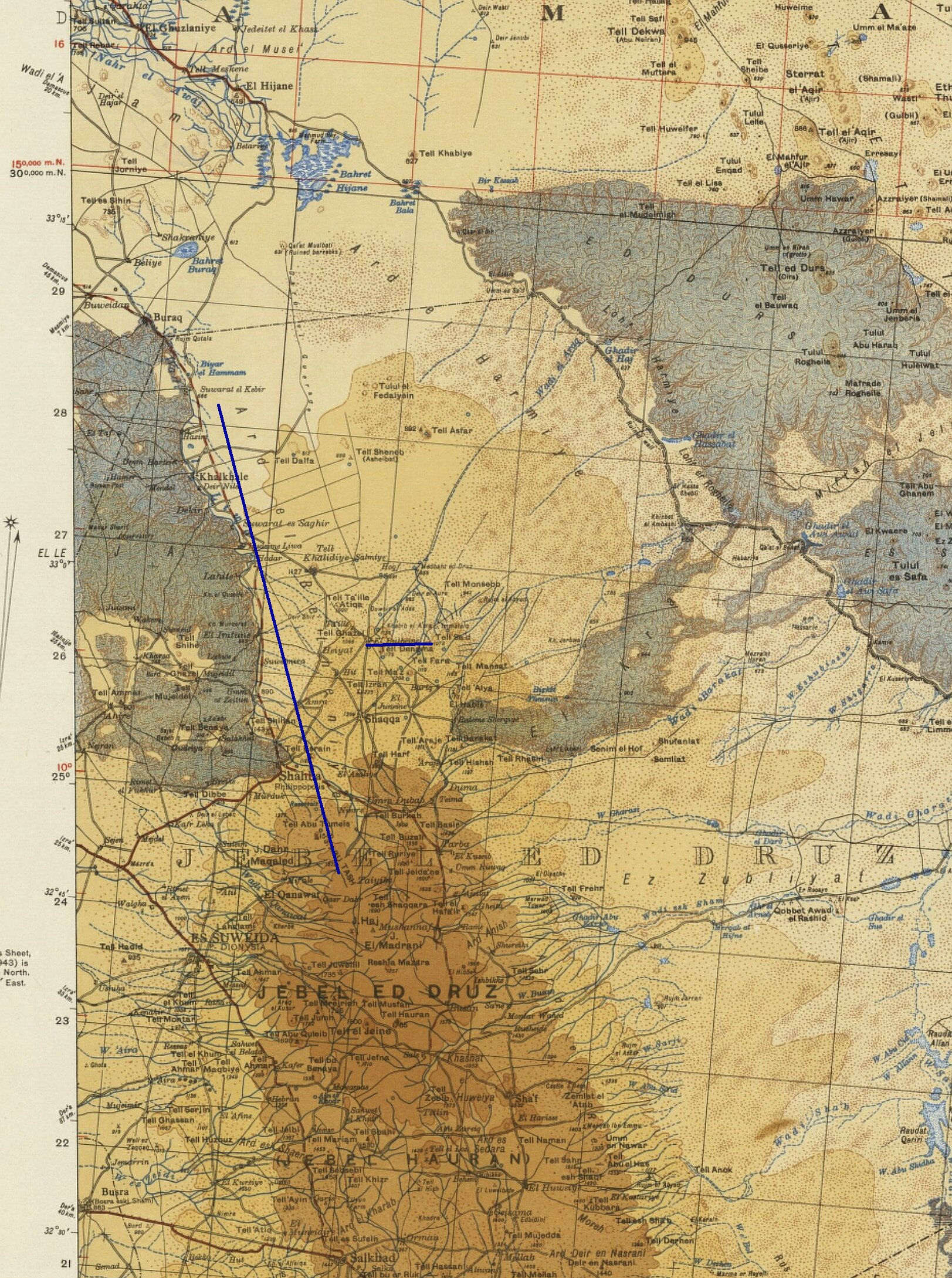
1938 English topographic map (detail)

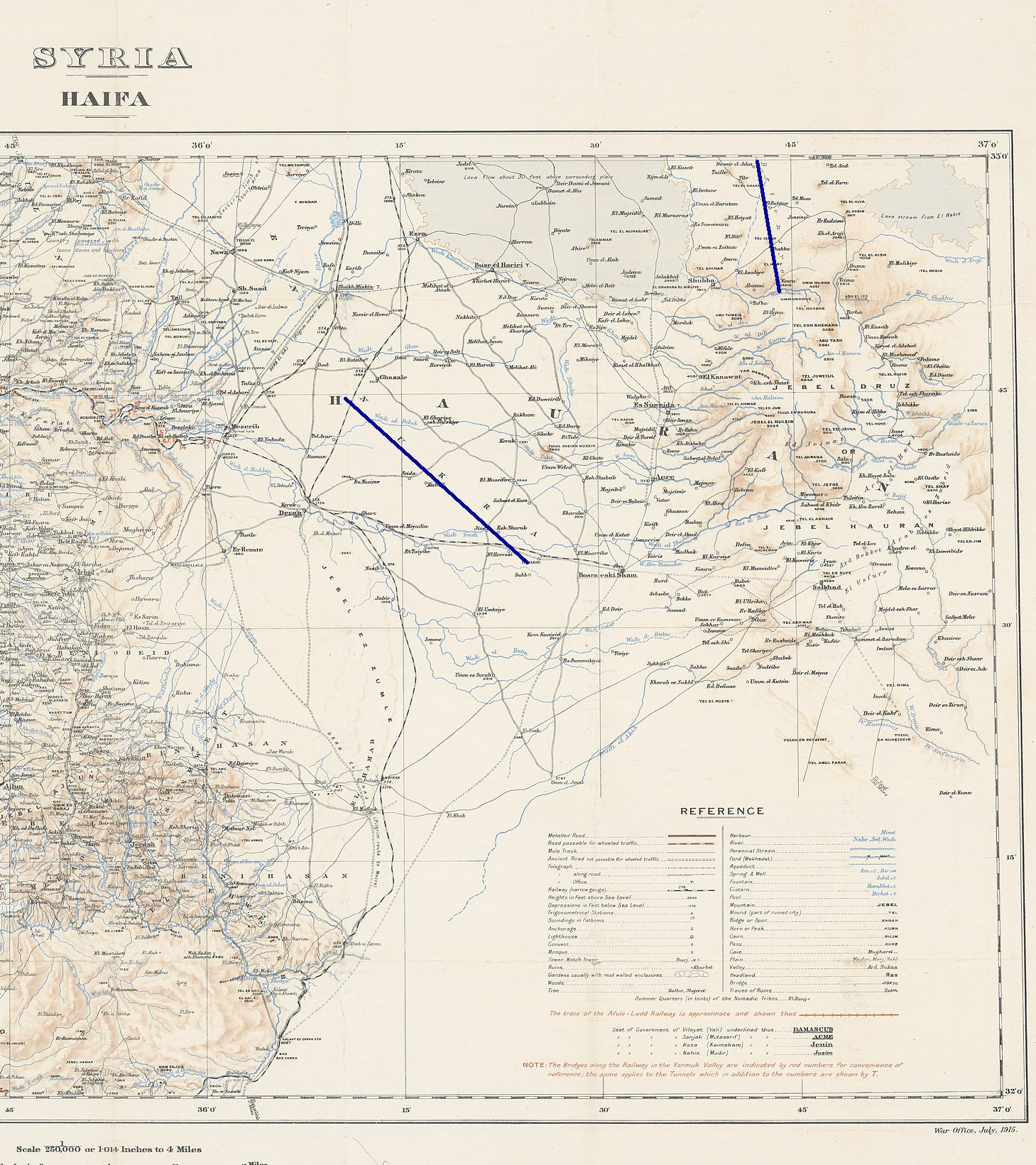
English topographic map with Batanea (Beteniye) and Nukra marked

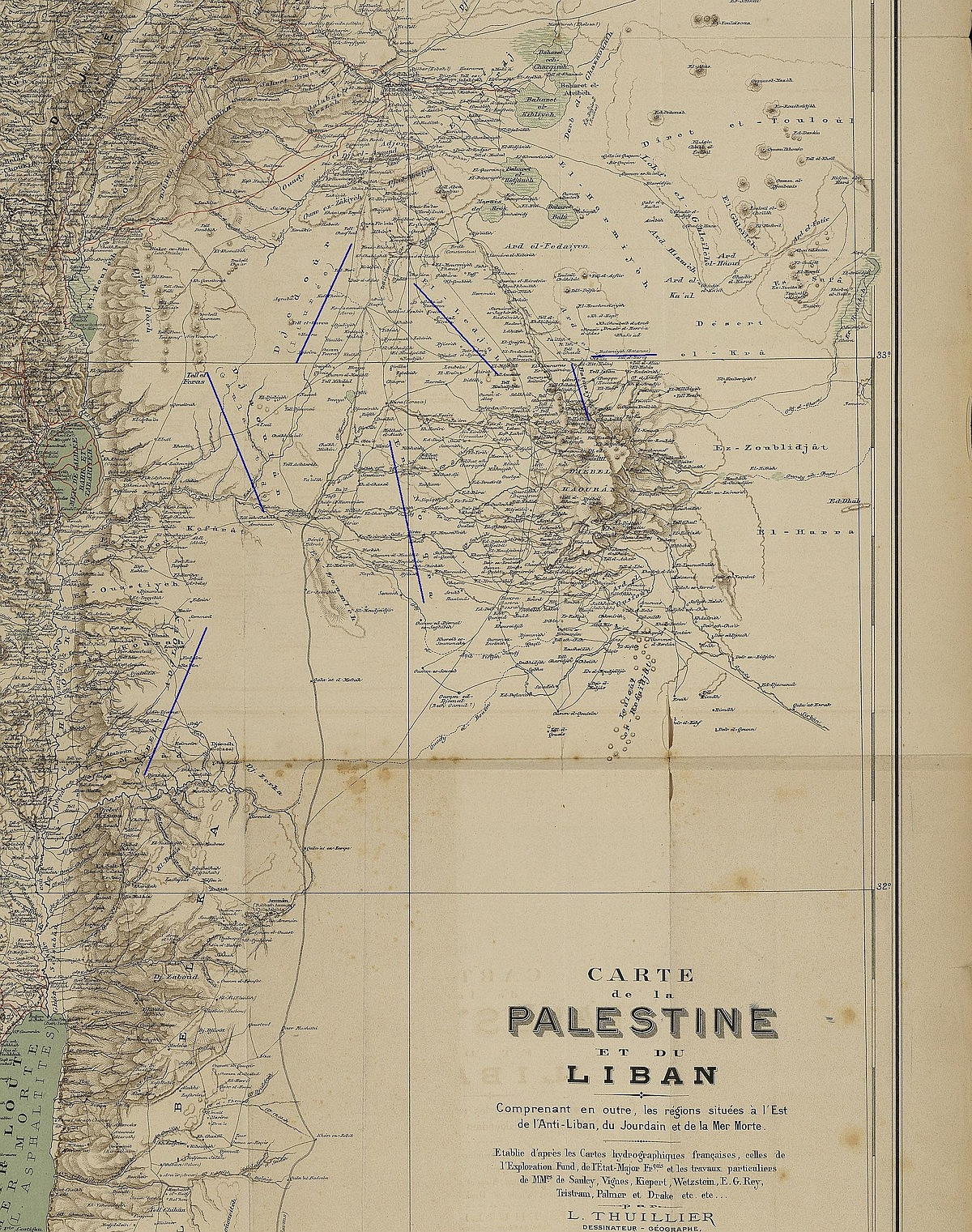

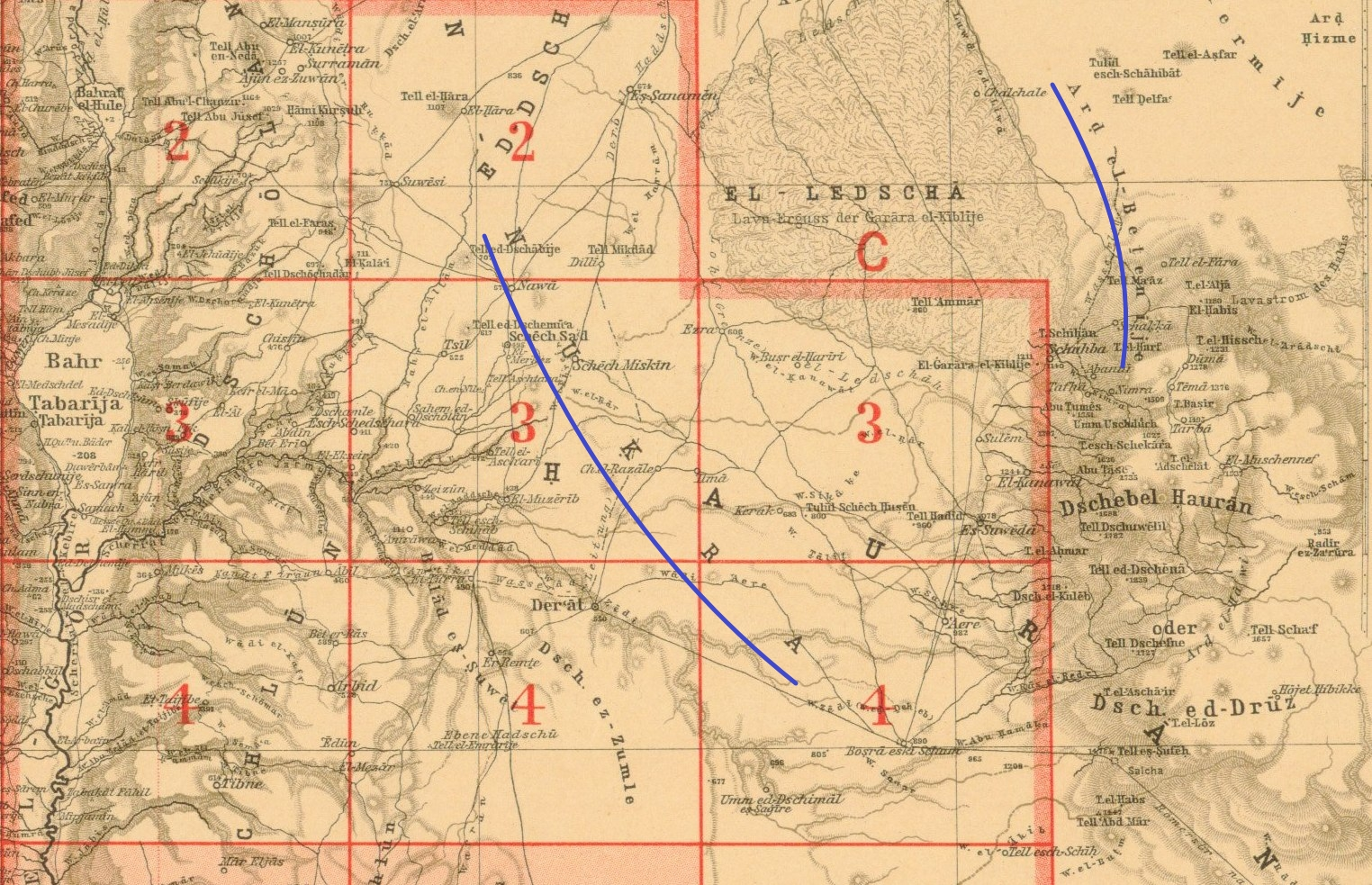
1908 German map (detail)
