= François Blanchetière =

French historian

Academic work
- Discipline: Biblical studies
- Main interests: continuity between Second Temple period Judaism and Jewish Christianity

François Blanchetière is a French New Testament scholar. He is known for his view on continuity between Second Temple period Judaism and Jewish Christianity and considers that Jesus cannot be considered as a "founder" of a religion. Blanchetière considers that "Nazarene" religion was a religious movement of Semitic character within Judaism. His position is often linked to that of Simon Claude Mimouni.
