= Simon Claude Mimouni =

French biblical scholar (born 1949)

- Born: 26 April 1949 (age 76); Bône, French Algeria
- Occupation: Historian
- Known for: Biblical studies

Simon Claude Mimouni (born 26 April 1949) is a French biblical scholar. He published first on Christian legends surrounding the assumption of Mary (1995, 2003), then worked on fragments of Jewish–Christian gospels associated with the 3rd and 4th century judaizing Christian sects (2006). He is known for his theory of continuity between Jewish early Christianity and the later sects of Nazarenes and Ebionites.

== Works ==
- 1995: Dormition et assomption de Marie : Histoire des traditions anciennes, Beauchesne, coll. « Théologie historique » (98), 716 p. ISBN 2-7010-1320-8 * 1998 : Le Judéo-christianisme ancien : Essais historiques, Éditions du Cerf, coll. « Patrimoines », 547 p. ISBN 2-204-05937-4
- 2003: La Tradition grecque de la Dormition et de l'Assomption de Marie, avec Sever Juan Voicu, Éditions du Cerf, coll. « Sagesses chrétiennes », 244 p. ISBN 2-204-06978-7
- 2004: Les Chrétiens d'origine juive dans l'Antiquité, Albin Michel, coll. « Présences du judaïsme poche » (29), 261 p. ISBN 2-226-15441-8
- 2006: Le Christianisme des origines à Constantin, with Pierre Maraval, Presses universitaires de France, series. « Nouvelle Clio », 528 p. ISBN 2-13-052877-5
- 2006: Les fragments évangéliques judéo-chrétiens apocryphisés : Recherches et perspectives, J. Gabalda et Cie, coll. « Cahiers de la revue biblique » (66), 93 p. OCLC 70987533
- 2007: La circoncision dans le monde judéen aux époques grecque et romaine : Histoire d'un conflit interne au judaïsme, Peeters, coll. « Collection de la Revue des études juives » (42), 388 p. ISBN 978-2-87723-995-0
- 2011: Les traditions anciennes sur la Dormition et l’Assomption de Marie. Etudes littéraires, historiques et doctrinales, Brill, coll. « Supplements to Vigiliae Christianae » 104.
- 2012: Early Judaeo-Christianity. Historical Essays, Peeters, coll. Interdisciplinary Studies in Ancient Culture and Religion (13).
- 2012: Le judaïsme ancien du VIe siècle avant notre ère au IIIe siècle de notre ère : des prêtres aux rabbins, Presses universitaires de France, coll. « Nouvelle Clio ».
