= Cypros (wife of Herod Agrippa) =

Wife of Herod Agrippa

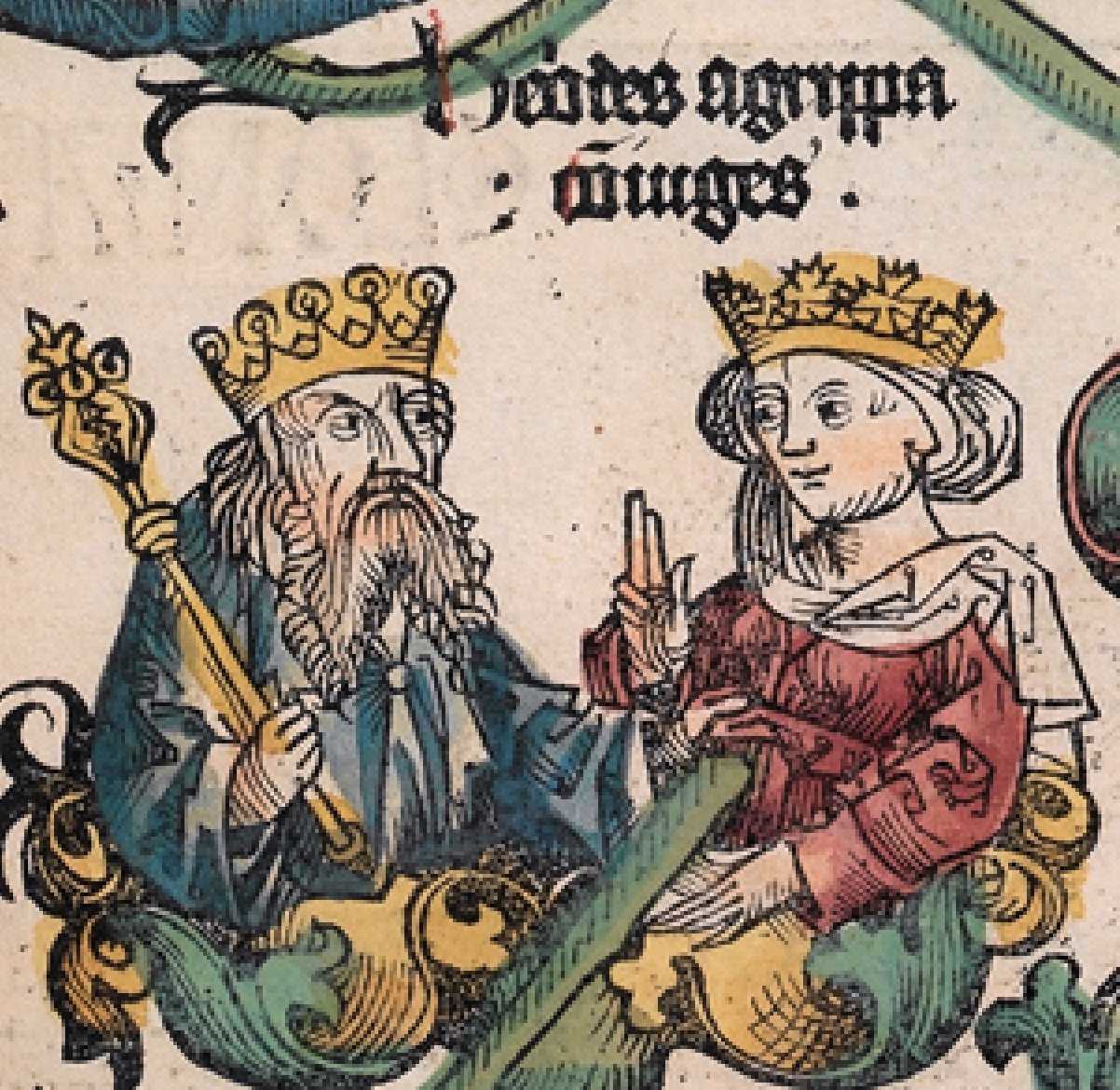
Herod Agrippa I and Cypros, in the 1493 Nuremberg Chronicle

Cypros (circa 10 E.C. - 50 C.E.), also called Cypros II, was a queen consort of Judea. She was married to her cousin king Herod Agrippa of Judea. Queen Cypros II evidently played a public role during the reign of Herodes Agrippa, who had coins minted in her image as well as sculptural portraits made of her. She reported to have acted in favor of her husband's political career on at least two occasions.

== Life ==
Cypros was born to Phasael II and Salampsio in circa 10 C.E. She was thereby the paternal granddaughter of Phasael I, brother of Herod the Great, and belonged to both the Herodian and Hasmonean royal houses. Cypros II was named after Cypros I, the mother of King Herod the Great.

The marriage between the two cousins Cypros and Herod Agrippa took place soon after Herod's return to Idumea from Rome, where he had been raised, in circa 23 C.E.

At the time Herod was in a bad situation, since he had spent most of his fortune in Rome, and needed a lucrative office. His lack of position and finances made Cypros fear that he would commit suicide and she searched for an office for him. With the help of Herodias, in 25 EC she convinced Herod Antipas to appoint Herod Agrippa as governor in Tiberias in Galilee.

In 34 CE, when Agrippa and Antipas became involved in conflict, Agrippa wished to return to Rome. Cypros II accompanied him as far as Alexandria, where she successfully negotiated a loan from the banker Alexander the Alabarch of Alexandria, to finance his exile and a make it possible for him to live in accordance with his rank during his exile in Rome.

In 36 C.E., Herod Agrippa I was made King of Judea by Emperor Caligula. Herod returned to Judea, and Cypros became Queen of Judea. Queen Cypros II evidently played a public role as queen, as was the common custom of the Hellenized world at the time. King Herod Agrippa I is known to have made at least two coins of his wife that bear the inscription, “Cypros” or “Queen Cypros”on them; one of them is showing the bust portrait of the queen, and on the other, she is standing, facing forward.

King Herod Agrippa I died in 44 C.E. Queen Cypros II outlived him, and died circa 50 C.E.

Queen Cypros II is mentioned in an epigram attributed to Phillip of Thessalonica:

“Modeling all with shuttle laboring on the loom, Cypros made a perfect copy of the harvest-bearing earth, all that the land-encircling ocean girdles, obedient to great Caesar, the grey sea too…it was a Queen’s duty to bring gifts so long due to gods.”

== Issue ==
Agrippa and Cypros had five children: Herodes Agrippa II, Drusus (died in infancy), Berenice, Mariamne and Drusilla. Agrippa and Cypros repaid their loan from Alexander Alabarchs by arranging a marriage between their daughter Berenice and the son of Alexander, Marcus Julius Alexander.

- Herod Agrippa II [b. AD 27/28?-d. 93?] became the eighth and final ruler from the Herodian family, but without any control of Judea. He supported Roman Rule and died childless.
- Berenice [b. AD 28-after 81], who first married Marcus Julius Alexander, son of Alexander the Alabarch around AD 41. After Marcus Julius died [AD 44], she married her uncle Herod of Chalcis by whom she had two sons, Berenicianus and Hyrcanus. She later lived with her brother Agrippa II, reputedly in an incestuous relationship. Finally, she married Polemon, king of Cilicia, as alluded to by Juvenal. Berenice also had a common law relationship with the Roman emperor Titus. Similar to her brother Herod Agrippa II, she supported Roman Rule.
- Drusus [b.?-d.?]; According to Josephus, there was also a younger brother called Drusus, who died before his teens.
- Mariamne [b. 34/35-], who married Julius Archelaus, son of Chelcias AD 49/50; they had a daughter Berenice (daughter of Mariamne) [b. AD 50] who lived with her mother in Alexandria, Egypt after her parents' divorce. Around AD 65 Mariamne left her husband and married Demetrius of Alexandria who was its Alabarch and had a son from him named Agrippinus.
- Drusilla [AD 38–79], who married first to Gaius Julius Azizus, King of Emesa and then to Antonius Felix, the procurator of Judaea. Drusilla and her son Marcus Antonius Agrippa died in Pompeii during the eruption of Vesuvius. A daughter, Antonia Clementiana, became a grandmother to a Lucius Anneius Domitius Proculus. Two possible descendants from this marriage are Marcus Antonius Fronto Salvianus (a quaestor) and his son Marcus Antonius Felix Magnus, a high priest in 225.
