= Philo =

Jewish philosopher (c. 20 BCE – c. 50 CE)

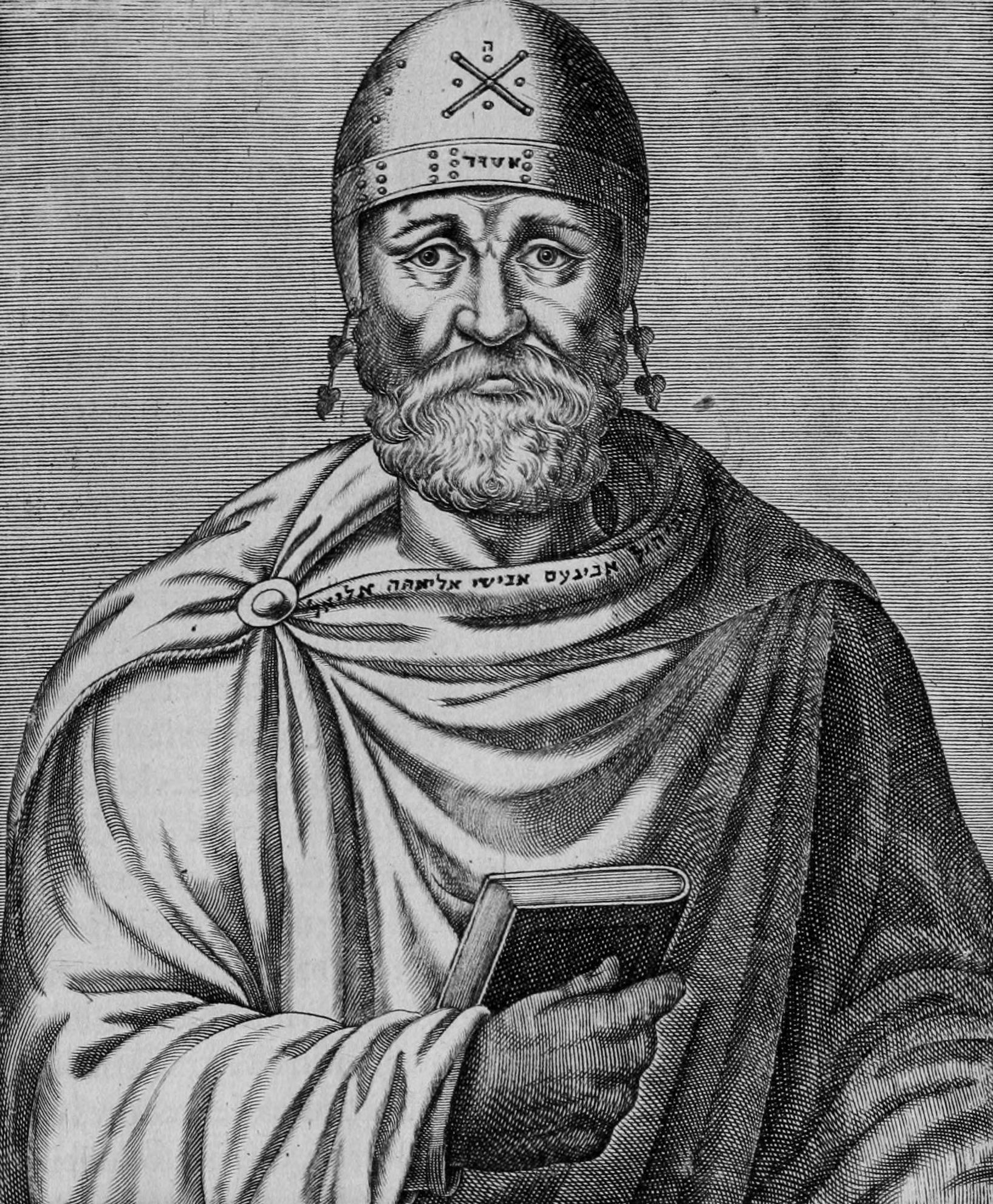
- Imaginative illustration of Philo made in 1584 by the French portrait artist André Thevet
- Born: c. 20 BCE; Alexandria, Roman Egypt, Roman Empire
- Died: c. 50 CE (aged about 70); Alexandria, Roman Egypt, Roman Empire

Philosophical work
- Era: Ancient philosophy
- Region: Roman Egypt
- School: Middle Platonism; Hellenistic Judaism
- Main interests: Cosmology, philosophy of religion
- Notable ideas: Allegorical interpretation of the Torah

Philo of Alexandria (/ˈfaɪloʊ/; Ancient Greek: Φίλων, romanized: Phílōn; Hebrew: יְדִידְיָה, romanized: Yəḏīḏyāh; c. 20 BCE – c. 50 CE), also called Philō Judæus, (Note: "Philo" is the literal Greek translation of the Hebrew name Yəḏīḏyāh 'beloved of God', 'God loves me'; see Jedediah and Yedidia.) was a Hellenistic Jewish philosopher who lived in Alexandria, in the Roman province of Egypt.

The only event in Philo's life that can be decisively dated is his representation of the Alexandrian Jews in a delegation to the Roman emperor Caligula in 40 CE following civil strife between the Jewish and Greek communities of Alexandria.

Philo was a leading writer of the Hellenistic Jewish community in Alexandria, Egypt. He wrote expansively in Koine Greek on philosophy, politics, and religion in his time; specifically, he explored the connections between Greek Platonic philosophy and late Second Temple Judaism. For example, he maintained that the Greek-language Septuagint and the Jewish law still being developed by the rabbis of the period together served as a blueprint for the pursuit of individual enlightenment.

Philo used philosophical allegory to harmonize the Hebrew Bible, mainly the Torah, with Greek philosophy. His method followed the practices of both Jewish exegesis and Stoicism. His allegorical exegesis was important for many Christian Church Fathers, but he had very little reception history within Rabbinic Judaism.. Many critics of Philo assumed his allegorical perspective, in contrast to Biblical Literalism, would lend credibility to the notion of legend over historicity. However, Philo often advocated a literal understanding of the Torah and the historicity of such described events, while at other times favoring allegorical readings.

Some scholars hold that his concept of the Logos as God's creative principle influenced early Christology. Other scholars deny direct influence but say that Philo and Early Christianity borrow from a common source.

== Life ==
Philo's dates of birth and death are unknown but can be judged by Philo's description of himself as "old" when he was part of the delegation to Gaius Caligula in 38 CE. Jewish history professor Daniel R. Schwartz estimates his birth year as sometime between 15 and 10 BCE. Philo's reference to an event under the reign of Emperor Claudius indicates that he died sometime between 45 and 50 CE. Philo also recounts that he visited the Second Temple in Jerusalem at least once in his lifetime.

=== Family ===
Although the names of his parents are unknown, it is known that Philo came from a family which was noble, honourable and wealthy. Either his father or paternal grandfather was granted Roman citizenship by Roman dictator Gaius Julius Caesar. Jerome wrote that Philo came de genere sacerdotum (from a priestly family). His ancestors and family had social ties and connections to the priesthood in Judea, the Hasmonean dynasty, the Herodian dynasty and the Julio-Claudian dynasty in Rome.

Philo had one brother, Alexander Lysimachus, who was the general tax administrator of customs in Alexandria. He accumulated an immense amount of wealth, becoming not only the richest man in that city but also in the entire Hellenistic world. Alexander was so rich that he gave a loan to the wife of king Herod Agrippa, as well as gold and silver to overlay the nine gates of the temple in Jerusalem. Due to his extreme wealth, Alexander was also influential in imperial Roman circles as a friend of emperor Claudius. Through Alexander, Philo had two nephews, Tiberius Julius Alexander and Marcus Julius Alexander. The latter was the first husband of the Herodian princess Berenice. Marcus died in 43 or 44. Some scholars identify Alexander Lysimachus as the Alexander referenced in the Book of Acts, who presided over the Sanhedrin trial of John and Peter.

=== Diplomacy ===
Philo lived in an era of increasing ethnic tension in Alexandria, exacerbated by the new strictures of imperial rule. Some expatriate Hellenes (Greeks) in Alexandria condemned the Jews for a supposed alliance with Rome, even as Rome was seeking to suppress Jewish national and cultural identity in the Roman province of Judaea. In Antiquities of the Jews, Josephus tells of Philo's selection by the Alexandrian Jewish community as their principal representative before the Roman emperor Gaius Caligula. He says that Philo agreed to represent the Alexandrian Jews about the civil disorder that had developed between the Jews and the Greeks. Josephus also tells us that Philo was skilled in philosophy and that he was brother to the alabarch Alexander. According to Josephus, Philo and the larger Jewish community refused to treat the emperor as a god, to erect statues in honour of the emperor, and to build altars and temples to the emperor. Josephus says Philo believed that God actively supported this refusal.

Josephus' complete comments about Philo:

There was now a tumult arisen at Alexandria, between the Jewish inhabitants and the Greeks; and three ambassadors were chosen out of each party that were at variance, who came to Gaius. Now one of these ambassadors from the people of Alexandria was Apion, (29) who uttered many blasphemies against the Jews; and, among other things that he said, he charged them with neglecting the honors that belonged to Caesar; for that while all who were subject to the Roman empire built altars and temples to Gaius, and in other regards universally received him as they received the gods, these Jews alone thought it a dishonorable thing for them to erect statues in honor of him, as well as to swear by his name. Many of these severe things were said by Apion, by which he hoped to provoke Gaius to anger at the Jews, as he was likely to be. But Philo, the principal of the Jewish embassage, a man eminent on all accounts, brother to Alexander the Alabarch, (30) and one not unskillful in philosophy, was ready to betake himself to make his defense against those accusations; but Gaius prohibited him, and bid him begone; he was also in such a rage, that it openly appeared he was about to do them some very great mischief. So Philo being thus affronted, went out, and said to those Jews who were about him, that they should be of good courage, since Gaius's words indeed showed anger at them, but in reality had already set God against himself.

This event is also described in Book 2, Chapter 5 of Eusebius's Historia Ecclesiae.

=== Education ===
Philo along with his brothers received a thorough education. They were educated in the Hellenistic culture of Alexandria and the culture of ancient Rome, to a degree in Ancient Egyptian religion and particularly in the traditions of Judaism, in the study of Jewish traditional literature and in Greek philosophy.

In his works, Philo shows extensive influence not only from philosophers such as Plato and the Stoics, but also poets and orators, especially Homer, Euripides, and Demosthenes. Philo's largest philosophical influence was Plato, drawing heavily from the Timaeus and the Phaedrus, and also from the Phaedo, Theaetetus, Symposium, Republic, and Laws.

The extent of Philo's knowledge of Hebrew, however, is debated. Philo was more fluent in Greek than in Hebrew and read the Jewish Scriptures chiefly from the Septuagint, a Koine Greek translation of Hebraic texts later compiled as the Hebrew Bible and the deuterocanonical books. His numerous etymologies of Hebrew names, which are along the lines of the etymologic midrash to Genesis and of the earlier rabbinism, although not modern Hebrew philology, suggest some familiarity. Philo offers for some names three or four etymologies, sometimes including the correct Hebrew root (e.g., Hebrew: י־ר־ד, romanized: y-r-d, lit. 'descend' as the origin of the name Jordan). However, his works do not display much understanding of Hebrew grammar, and they tend to follow the translation of the Septuagint more closely than the Hebrew version. (Note: The Septuagint translates Hebrew: מַלְאַךְ יְהוָה, romanized: Malakh YHWH, lit. 'Messenger of Yahweh' as Ancient Greek: ἄγγελος Κυρίου, lit. 'angel of the Lord'))

Philo identified the angel of the Lord (in the singular) with the Logos. In the text attributed to Philo, he "consistently uses Κύριος as a designation for God". According to David B. Capes, "the problem for this case, however, is that Christian scholars are responsible for copying and transmitting Philo's words to later generations", and adds,

George Howard surveys evidence and concludes: "Although it is improbable that Philo varied from the custom of writing the Tetragram when quoting from Scripture, it is likely that he used the word Κύριος when making a secondary reference to the divine name in his exposition".

James Royse concludes:

(1) the exegete [Philo] knows and reads biblical manuscripts in which the tetragram is written in palaeo-Hebrew or Aramaic script and not translated by kyrios and that (2) he quotes scriptures in the same way he would have pronounced it, that is, by translating it as kurios."

== Philosophy ==
Philo represents the apex of Jewish-Hellenistic syncretism. His work attempts to combine Plato and Moses into one philosophical system.

=== Allegorical interpretation ===
Philo bases his doctrines on the Hebrew Bible, which he considers the source and standard not only of religious truth but of all truth. (Note: The extent of his canon cannot be exactly determined. He does not quote the Books of Ezekiel, Daniel, Canticles, Ruth, Lamentations, Ecclesiastes, or Esther.) Its pronouncements are the ἱερὸς λόγος, θεῖος λόγος, and ὀρθὸς λόγος (holy word, godly word, righteous word), uttered sometimes directly and sometimes through the mouth of a prophet, and especially through Moses, whom Philo considers the true medium of revelation. However, he distinguishes between the words uttered by God himself, such as the Ten Commandments, and the edicts of Moses (as the special laws).

Philo regards the Bible as the source not only of religious revelation but also of philosophical truth. Philo claims that Moses learned mathematics from the Egyptians, astronomy and astrology from the Chaldeans, and other subjects from the Greeks. He says that Moses advanced beyond his teachers, leading them to learn from him instead. Philo believed the Greeks such as Heraclitus took ideas from Mosaic law. By applying the Stoic mode of allegorical interpretation to the Hebrew Bible, he interpreted the stories of the first five books as elaborate metaphors and symbols to demonstrate that Greek philosophers' ideas had preceded them in the Bible: Heraclitus's concept of binary oppositions, according to Who is the Heir of Divine Things? § 43 [i. 503]; and the conception of the wise man expounded by Zeno of Citium, the founder of Stoicism, in Every Good Man is Free, § 8 [ii. 454]. Philo did not reject the subjective experience of ancient Judaism; yet, he repeatedly explained that the Septuagint cannot be understood as a concrete, objective history.

Philo's allegorical interpretation of scripture allows him to grapple with morally disturbing events and impose a cohesive explanation of stories. Specifically, Philo interprets the characters of the Bible as aspects of the human being and the stories of the Bible as episodes from universal human experience. For example, Adam represents the mind and Eve, the senses. Noah represents tranquility, a stage of "relative"—incomplete but progressing—righteousness. According to Josephus, Philo was inspired mainly in this by Aristobulus of Alexandria and the Alexandrian school.

==== Numerology ====
Philo frequently engaged in Pythagorean-inspired numerology, explaining at length the importance of the first 10 numerals:

1. One is God’s number and the basis for all numbers.
2. Two is the number of schism, that which has been created, and death.
3. Three is the number of the body ("De Allegoriis Legum", i. 2 [i. 44]) or of the Divine Being in connection with its fundamental powers ("De Sacrificiis Abelis et Caini", § 15 [i. 173]).
4. Four is potentially what ten is actually: the perfect number ("De Opificio Mundi", §§ 15, 16 [i. 10, 11], etc.); but in an evil sense, four is the number of the passions, πάθη ("De Congressu Quærendæ Eruditionis Gratia". § 17 [i. 532]).
5. Five is the number of the senses and of sensibility ("De Opificio Mundi", § 20 [i. 14], etc.).
6. Six, the product of the masculine and feminine numbers 3×2 and in its parts equal to 3+3, is the symbol of the movement of organic beings ("De Allegoriis Legum", i. 2 [i. 44]).
7. Seven has the most various attributes ("De Opiticio Mundi", §§ 30-43 [i. 21 et seq.]; comp. I. G. Müller, "Philo und die Weltschöpfung", 1841, p. 211).
8. Eight, the number of the cube, has many of the attributes determined by the Pythagoreans ("Quæstiones in Genesin", iii. 49 [i. 223, Aucher]).
9. Nine is the number of strife, according to Gen. xiv. ("De Congressu Qu. Eruditionis Gratia", § 17 [i. 532]).
10. Ten is the number of perfection ("De Plantatione Noë", § 29 [i. 347]).

Philo also determines the values of the numbers 50, 70, 100, 12, and 120. There is also extensive symbolism of objects. Philo elaborates on the extensive symbolism of proper names, following the example of the Bible and the Midrash, to which he adds many new interpretations.

=== Theology ===
Philo stated his theology both through the negation of opposing ideas and through detailed, positive explanations of the nature of God; he contrasted the nature of God with the nature of the physical world. Philo did not consider God similar to Heaven, the world, or man; he affirmed a transcendent God without physical features or emotional qualities resembling those of human beings. Following Plato, Philo equates matter to nothingness and sees its effect in fallacy, discord, damage, and decay of things. Only God's existence is specific; no appropriate predicates can be conceived. To Philo, God exists beyond time and space and does not make special interventions into the world because God already encompasses the entire cosmos.

Philo also integrated select theology from the rabbinic tradition, including God's transcendence, and humankind's inability to behold an ineffable God. He argued that God has no attributes (ἁπλοῡς)—in consequence, no name (ἅρρητος)—and, therefore, that God cannot be perceived by man (ἀκατάληπτος). Furthermore, he posited that God cannot change (ἅτρεπτος): God is always the same (ἀΐδιος). God needs no other being (χρῄζει γὰρ οὐδενὸς τὸ παράπαν) for self-existence or the creation of material things, and God is self-sufficient (ἑαυτῷ ἱκανός). God can never perish (ἅφθαρτος), is self-existent (ὁ ὤν, τὸ ὄν), and has no relations with any other being (τὸ γὰρ ὄν, ᾗ ὄν ἐστιν, οὐχὶ τῶν πρός τι).

==== Anthropomorphism ====
Philo considered the anthropomorphism of the Bible to be an impiety that was incompatible with the Platonic conception of "God in opposition to matter", instead interpreting the ascription to God of hands and feet, eyes and ears, tongue and windpipe, as allegories. In Philo's interpretation, Hebrew scripture adapts itself to human conceptions, and so God is occasionally represented as a man for pedagogic reasons. The same holds true for God's anthropopathic attributes. God, as such, is untouched by unreasonable emotions, as appears in Exodus 32:12, wherein Moses, torn by his feelings, perceives God alone to be calm. He is free from sorrow, pain, and other affections. But God is frequently represented as endowed with human emotions, and this serves to explain expressions referring to human repentance in the ancient Jewish context.

Similarly, God cannot exist or change in space. He has no "where" (πού, obtained by changing the accent in Genesis 3:9: "Adam, where [ποῡ] art thou?"), is not in any place. He is Himself the place; the dwelling-place of God means the same as God Himself, as in the Mishnah = "God is" (comp. Freudenthal, "Hellenistische Studien", p. 73), corresponding to the tenet of Greek philosophy that the existence of all things is summed up in God. God as such is motionless, as the Bible indicates by the phrase "God stands".

==== Divine attributes ====
Philo endeavored to find the Divine Being active and acting in the world, in agreement with Stoicism, yet his Platonic conception of Matter as evil required that he place God outside of the world in order to prevent God from having any contact with evil. Hence, he was obliged to separate from the Divine Being the activity displayed in the world and to transfer it to the divine powers, which accordingly were sometimes inherent in God and at other times exterior to God. In order to balance these Platonic and Stoic conceptions, Philo conceived of these divine attributes as types or patterns of actual things ("archetypal ideas") in keeping with Plato, but also regarded them as the efficient causes that not only represent the types of things, but also produce and maintain them. Philo endeavored to harmonize this conception with the Bible by designating these powers as angels. Philo conceives the powers both as independent hypostases and as immanent attributes of a Divine Being.

In the same way, Philo contrasts the two divine attributes of goodness and power (ἄγαθότης and ἀρχή, δίναμις χαριστική and συγκολαστική) as expressed in the names of God; designating "Yhwh" as Goodness, Philo interpreted "Elohim" (LXX. Θεός) as designating the "cosmic power"; and as he considered the Creation the most important proof of divine goodness, he found the idea of goodness especially in Θεός. (Note: On the parallel activity of the two powers and the symbols used therefor in Scripture, as well as on their emanation from God and their further development into new powers, their relation to God and the world, their part in the Creation, their tasks toward man, etc., see Siegfried, "Philo", pp. 214–218.)

==== Logos ====
Philo also treats the divine powers of God as a single independent being, or demiurge, which he designates "Logos". Philo's conception of the Logos is influenced by Heraclitus' conception of the "dividing Logos" (λόγος τομεύς), which calls the various objects into existence by the combination of contrasts ("Quis Rerum Divinarum Heres Sit", § 43 [i. 503]), as well as the Stoic characterization of the Logos as the active and vivifying power.

But Philo followed the Platonic distinction between imperfect matter and perfect Form, and Philo's conception of the Logos is directly related to the Middle Platonic view of God as unmoved and utterly transcendent; therefore, intermediary beings were necessary to bridge the enormous gap between God and the material world. The Logos was the highest of these intermediary beings and was called by Philo "the first-born of God."

Philo also adapted Platonic elements in designating the Logos as the "idea of ideas" and the "archetypal idea". Philo identified Plato's Ideas with the demiurge's thoughts. These thoughts make the contents of Logos; they were the seals for making sensual things during world creation. Logos resembles a book with creature paradigms. An Architect's design before the construction of a city serves to Philo as another simile of Logos. Since creation, Logos binds things together. As the receptacle and holder of ideas, Logos is distinct from the material world. At the same time, Logos pervades the world, supporting it. This image of God is the type for all other things (the "Archetypal Idea" of Plato), a seal impressed upon things. The Logos is a kind of shadow cast by God, having the outlines but not the blinding light of the Divine Being. He calls the Logos "second god [deuteros theos]" the "name of God,"

There are, in addition, Biblical elements: Philo connects his doctrine of the Logos with Scripture, first of all, based on Genesis 1:27, the relation of the Logos to God. He translates this passage as follows: "He made man after the image of God," concluding from that place that an image of God existed. The Logos is also designated as "high priest" in reference to the exalted position that the high priest occupied after the Exile as the physical center of the Jews' relationship with God. The Logos, like the high priest, is the expiator of the Jews' sins and the mediator and advocate for humankind before, and envoy to, God: ἱκέτης, and παράκλητος. He puts human minds in order. The right reason is an infallible law, the source of any other laws. The angel blocking Balaam's way in Numbers 22:22–35 is interpreted by Philo as a manifestation of the Logos, which acts as Balaam's—or humankind's—conscience. As such, the Logos becomes the aspect of the divine that operates in the world through whom the world is created and sustained.

Peter Schäfer argues that Philo's Logos was derived from his understanding of the "postbiblical Wisdom literature, in particular the Book of Wisdom". The Book of Wisdom is a Jewish work composed in Alexandria, Egypt, around the 1st century BCE, to bolster the faith of the Jewish community in a hostile Greek world. It is one of the seven Sapiential or Wisdom books included in the Septuagint.

=== Soul ===
The Logos has a special relation to humankind. Philo seems to look at humans as a trichotomy of nous (mind), psyche (soul), and soma (body), which was common to the Hellenistic view of the mind-body relationship. In Philo's writings, however, mind and spirit are used interchangeably. The soul is the type; man is the copy. The similarity is found in the mind (νοῦς) of humans. For the shaping of the nous, the individual has the Logos for a pattern to follow. The latter officiates here also as "the divider" (τομεύς), separating and uniting. The Logos, as "interpreter," announces God's designs to humankind, acting in this respect as prophet and priest. As the latter, the Logos softens punishments by making God's merciful power stronger than the punitive. The Logos has a special mystic influence upon the human soul, illuminating it and nourishing it with higher spiritual food, like the manna, of which the most diminutive piece has the same vitality as the whole.

=== Ethics and politics ===
Philo's ethics were strongly influenced by Pythagoreanism and Stoicism, preferring a morality of virtues without passions, such as lust/desire and anger, but with a "common human sympathy". Commentators can also infer from his mission to Caligula that Philo was involved in politics. However, the nature of his political beliefs, especially his viewpoint on the Roman Empire, is a matter of debate.

Philo did suggest in his writings that a prudent man should withhold his genuine opinion about tyrants:

he will of necessity take up caution as a shield, as a protection to prevent his suffering any sudden and unexpected evil; for as I imagine what a wall is to a city, that caution is to an individual. Do not these men then talk foolishly, are they not mad, who desire to display their inexperience and freedom of speech to kings and tyrants, at times daring to speak and to do things in opposition to their will? Do they not perceive that they have not only put their necks under the yoke like brute beasts, but that they have also surrendered and betrayed their whole bodies and souls likewise, and their wives and their children, and their parents, and all the rest of the numerous kindred and community of their other relations? ... when an opportunity offers, it is a good thing to attack our enemies and put down their power; but when we have no such opportunity, it is better to be quiet

== Works ==
The works of Philo are mostly allegorical interpretations of the Torah (known in the Hellenic world as the Pentateuch) but also include histories and comments on philosophy. Most of these were preserved in Greek by the Church Fathers; some survive only through an Armenian translation, and a smaller number survive in a Latin translation. The exact dates of writing and original organization plans are unknown for many of the texts attributed to Philo.

=== Commentaries on the Pentateuch ===
Most of Philo's surviving work deals with the Torah (the first five books of the Bible). Within this corpus are three categories:

- Quaestiones ("Inquiries") – short verse-by-verse exposition: four books on the Book of Genesis and two on the Book of Exodus. All six books are preserved through an Armenian translation published by Jean-Baptiste Aucher in 1826. A comparison with surviving Greek and Latin fragments recommends the translation as literal and accurate as it goes, but it suggests that some original content is missing. There are thought to be twelve original books, six of which are about Genesis and six of which are about Exodus.
- Allegorical Commentary – a longer exegesis explaining esoteric meanings; the surviving text deals only with the Book of Genesis, with the notable omission of Genesis 1.
- "Exposition of the Law" – a more straightforward synthesis of topics in the Pentateuch, probably written for Gentiles as well as Jews.

Philo's commentary on the Pentateuch is usually classified into three genres.

==== Quaestiones ====
The Quaestiones explain the Pentateuch catechetically, in the form of questions and answers ("Zητήματα καὶ Λύσεις, Quæstiones et Solutiones"). Only the following fragments have been preserved: abundant passages in Armenian – possibly the complete work – in explanation of Genesis and Exodus, an old Latin translation of a part of the "Genesis", and fragments from the Greek text in Eusebius, in the "Sacra Parallela", in the "Catena", and also in Ambrosius. The explanation is confined chiefly to determining the literal sense, although Philo frequently refers to the allegorical sense as the higher.

==== Allegorical commentary of the Torah ====
Νόμων Ἱερῶν Ἀλληγορίαι, or "Legum Allegoriæ", deals, so far as it has been preserved, with selected passages from Genesis. According to Philo's original idea, the history of primal humanity is here considered a symbol of the religious and moral development of the human soul. This commentary included the following treatises:

1. "Legum allegoriae", books i.–iii., on Gen. ii. 1–iii. 1a, 8b–19 (on the original extent and contents of these three books and the probably more correct combination of i. and ii.)
2. "De cherubim", on Gen. iii. 24, iv. 1;
3. "De sacrificiis Abelis et Caini", on Gen. iv. 2–4;
4. "De eo quod deterius potiori insidiatur";
5. "De posteritate Caini", on Gen. iv. 16-25
6. "De gigantibus", on Gen. vi. 1–4;
7. "Quod Deus sit immutabilis", on Gen. vi. 4–12
8. "De Agricultura Noë", on Gen. ix. 20;
9. "De Plantatione", on Gen. ix. 20b;
10. "De Ebrietate", on Gen. ix. 21
11. "Resipuit; Noë, seu De Sobrietate", on Gen. ix. 24–27;
12. "De Confusione Linguarum", on Gen. xi. 1–9;
13. "De Migratione Abrahami", on Gen. xii. 1–6;
14. "Quis Rerum Divinarum Heres Sit", on Gen. xv. 2–18;
15. "De Congressu Quærendæ Eruditionis Gratia", on Gen. xvi. 1–6;
16. "De Profugis", on Gen. xvi. 6–14;
17. "De Mutatione Nominum", on Gen. xvii, 1–22;
18. "De Somniis", book i., on Gen. xxviii. 12 et seq., xxxi. 11 et seq. (Jacob's dreams); "De Somniis", book ii., on Gen. xxxvii. 40 et seq. (the dreams of Joseph, of the cupbearer, the baker, and Pharaoh). Philo's three other books on dreams have been lost. The first of these (on the dreams of Abimelech and Laban) preceded the present book i., and discussed the dreams in which God Himself spoke with the dreamers, this fitting in very well with Gen. xx. 3.

==== Exposition of the Law ====
Philo wrote a systematic work on Moses and his laws, which is usually prefaced by the treatise "De Opificio Mundi". The Creation is, according to Philo, the basis for the Mosaic legislation, which is in complete harmony with nature ("De Opificio Mundi", § 1 [i. 1]). The exposition of the Law then follows in two sections. First come the biographies of the men who antedated the several written laws of the Torah, as Enos, Enoch, Noah, Abraham, Isaac, and Jacob. These were the Patriarchs, who were the living impersonations of the active law of virtue before there were any written laws.

Then, the laws are discussed in detail: first, the chief ten commandments (the Decalogue), and then the precepts in amplification of each law. The work is divided into the following treatises:

1. "De Opificio Mundi" (comp. Siegfried in "Zeitschrift für Wissenschaftliche Theologie", 1874, pp. 562–565; L Cohn's important separate edition of this treatise, Breslau, 1889, preceded the edition of the same in "Philonis Alexandrini", etc., 1896, i.).
2. "De Abrahamo", on Abraham, the representative of the virtue acquired by learning. The lives of Isaac and Jacob have been lost. The three patriarchs were intended as types of the ideal cosmopolitan condition of the world.
3. "De Josepho", the life of Joseph, intended to show how the wise man must act in the actually existing state.
4. "De Vita Mosis", books i.-iii.; Schürer, l.c. p. 523, combines the three books into two; but, as Massebieau shows (l.c. pp. 42 et seq.), a passage, though hardly an entire book, is missing at the end of the present second book (Wendland, in "Hermes", xxxi. 440). Schürer (l.c. pp. 515, 524) excludes this work here, although he admits that from a literary point of view, it fits into this group, but he considers it foreign to the work in general, since Moses, unlike the Patriarchs, can not be conceived as a universally valid type of moral action, and can not be described as such. The latter point may be admitted. However, the question remains whether it is necessary to consider the matter in this light. It seems most natural to preface the discussion of the law with the biography of the legislator. In contrast, the transition from Joseph to the legislation, from the statesman who has nothing to do with the divine laws to the discussion of these laws themselves, is forced and abrupt. As the perfect man, Moses unites in himself, in a way, all the faculties of the patriarchal types. His is the "most pure mind" ("De Mutatione Nominum", 37 [i. 610]), he is the "lover of virtue", who has been purified from all passions ("De Allegoriis Legum", iii. 45, 48 [i. 113, 115]). As the person awaiting the divine revelation, he is also specially fitted to announce it to others after receiving it in the form of the Commandments (ib. iii. 4 [i. 89 et seq.]).
5. "De Decalogo", the introductory treatise to the chief ten commandments of the Law.
6. "De Specialibus Legibus", in which treatise Philo attempts to systematize the several laws of the Torah and to arrange them in conformity with the Ten Commandments. To the first and second commandments he adds the laws relating to priests and sacrifices; to the third (misuse of the name of God), the laws on oaths, vows, etc.; to the fourth (on the Sabbath), the laws on festivals; to the fifth (to honor father and mother), the laws on respect for parents, old age, etc.; to the sixth, the marriage laws; to the seventh, the civil and criminal laws; to the eighth, the laws on theft; to the ninth, the laws on truthful testifying; and to the tenth, the laws on lust. The first book includes the following treatises of the current editions: "De Circumcisione"; "De Monarchia", books i. and ii.; "De Sacerdotum Honoribus"; "De Victimis". On the division of the book into these sections, the titles of the latter, and newly found sections of the text, see Schürer, l.c. p. 517; Wendland, l.c. pp. 136 et seq. The second book includes in the editions a section also entitled "De Specialibus Legibus" (ii. 270–277), to which is added the treatise "De Septenario", which is, however, incomplete in Mangey. The greater part of the missing portion was supplied under the title "De Cophini Festo et de Colendis Parentibus" by Mai (1818) and was printed in Richter's edition, v. 48–50, Leipsic, 1828. The complete text of the second book was published by Tischendorf in his "Philonea" (pp. 1–83). The third book is included under the title "De Specialibus Legibus" in ed. Mangey, ii. 299–334. The fourth book also is entitled "De Specialibus Legibus"; to it, the last sections are added under the titles "De Judice" and "De Concupiscentia" in the usual editions, and they include, also, as an appendix, the sections "De Justitia" and "De Creatione Principum".
7. The treatises "De Fortitudine", "De Caritate", and "De Pœnitentia" are a kind of appendix to "De Specialibus Legibus". combines them into a special book, which, he thinks, was composed by Philo.
8. "De Præmiis et Pœnis" and "De Execratione". On the connection of both This is the conclusion of the exposition of the Mosaic law.

This exposition is more exoteric than allegorical and might have been intended for gentile audiences.

=== Independent works ===
Philo is also credited with writing:

- Apologies for Judaism, including On the Life of Moses, On the Jews, and On the Contemplative Life.
- Historical works (describing current events in Alexandria and the Roman Empire), including Ad Flaccum and De legatione ad Gaium
- Philosophical works including Every Good Man Is Free, On the Eternity of the World, On Animals, and On Providence, the latter two surviving only through Armenian translation.
- Works now lost, but mentioned by Eusebius of Caesarea.
1. "On Providence", preserved only in Armenian, and printed from Aucher's Latin translation in the editions of Richter and others (on Greek fragments of the work see Schürer, l.c. pp. 531 et seq.).
2. "De Animalibus" (on the title, see Schürer, l.c. p. 532; in Richter's ed. viii. 101–144).
3. ϓποθετικά ("Counsels"), a work known only through fragments in Eusebius, Præparatio Evangelica, viii. 6, 7. The meaning of the title is open to discussion; it may be identical with the following
4. Περὶ Ἰουδαίων an apology for the Jews (Schürer, l.c. pp. 532 et seq.).

==== That all good men are free ====
This is the second half of a work on the freedom of the just according to Stoic principles. The genuineness of this work has been disputed by Frankel (in "Monatsschrift", ii. 30 et seq., 61 et seq.), by Grätz ("Gesch". iii. 464 et seq.), and more recently by Ansfeld (1887), Hilgenfeld (in "Zeitschrift für Wissenschaftliche Theologie", 1888, pp. 49–71), and others. Now Wendland, Ohle, Schürer, Massebieau, and Krell consider it genuine, except the partly interpolated passages on the Essenes.

==== Embassy to Gaius ====
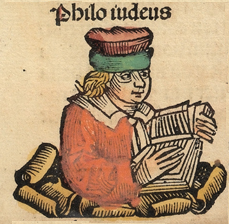
Woodcut from Die Schedelsche Weltchronik (Nuremberg Chronicle)

In Legatio ad Gaium (Embassy to Gaius), Philo describes his diplomatic mission to Gaius Caligula, one of the few events in his life which is explicitly known. He relates that he was carrying a petition describing the sufferings of the Alexandrian Jews and asking the emperor to secure their rights.

==== Against Flaccus ====
In Against Flaccus, Philo describes the situation of the Jews in Egypt, writing that they numbered not less than a million and inhabited two of the five districts in Alexandria. He recounts the abuses of the prefect Aulus Avilius Flaccus, who he says retaliated against the Jews when they refused to worship Caligula as a god. Daniel Schwartz surmises that given this tense background, it may have been politically convenient for Philo to favor abstract monotheism instead of overt pro-Judeanism.

Philo considers Caligula's plan to erect a statue of himself in the Second Temple to be a provocation, asking, "Are you making war upon us, because you anticipate that we will not endure such indignity, but that we will fight on behalf of our laws, and die in defence of our national customs? For you cannot possibly have been ignorant of what was likely to result from your attempt to introduce these innovations respecting our temple." In his entire presentation, he implicitly supports the Jewish commitment to rebel against the emperor rather than allow such sacrilege to take place.

This account, consisting initially of five books, has been preserved in fragments only (see Schürer, l.c. pp. 525 et seq.). Philo intended to show the fearful punishment meted out by God to the persecutors of the Jews (on Philo's predilection for similar discussions see Siegfried, "Philo von Alexandria", p. 157). Philo says he was regarded by his people as having unusual prudence due to his age, education, and knowledge. This indicates that he was already an older man at this time (40 CE).

==== On the Contemplative Life ====
This work describes the mode of life and the religious festivals of a society of Jewish ascetics, who, according to the author, are widely scattered over the earth and are found predominantly in every nome in Egypt. The writer, however, confines himself to describing the Therapeutae, a colony of hermits settled on Lake Mareotis in Egypt, where each lives separately in his own dwelling. Six days of the week they spend in pious contemplation, chiefly in connection with Scripture. On the seventh day, both men and women assemble together in a hall, and the leader delivers a discourse consisting of an allegorical interpretation of a scriptural passage. The feast of the fiftieth day is the most celebrated. The ceremony begins with a frugal meal consisting of bread, salted vegetables, and water, during which a passage of Scripture is interpreted. After the meal, the members of the society, in turn, sing religious songs of various kinds, to which the assembly answers with a refrain. The ceremony ends with a choral representation of the triumphal festival Moses and Miriam arranged after the passage through the Red Sea, the voices of the men and the women uniting in a choral symphony until the sun rises. After a common morning prayer, each goes home to resume contemplation. Such is the contemplative life (βίος θεωρητικός) led by these Θεραπευταί ("servants of Yhwh").

The ancient Christian Church regarded these Therapeutæ as disguised Christian monks. This view has found advocates even recently P. E. Lucius's opinion, particularly that the Christian monastery of the third century was here glorified in a Jewish disguise, was widely accepted ("Die Therapeuten", 1879).

Massebieau ("Revue de l'Histoire des Religions", 1887, xvi. 170 et seq., 284 et seq.), Conybeare ("Philo About the Contemplative Life", Oxford, 1895), and Wendland ("Die Therapeuten", etc., Leipsig, 1896) ascribe the entire work to Philo, basing their argument wholly on linguistic reasons, which seem sufficiently conclusive. However, there are significant dissimilarities between the fundamental conceptions of the author of the "De Vita Contemplativa" and those of Philo. The latter looks upon Greek culture and philosophy as allies, and the former is hostile to Greek philosophy (see Siegfried in "Protestantische Kirchenzeitung", 1896, No.42). He repudiates a science that numbered among Its followers the sacred band of the Pythagoreans, inspired men like Parmenides, Empedocles, Zeno, Cleanthes, Heraclitus, and Plato, whom Philo prized ("Quod Omnis Probus", i., ii.; "Quis Rerum Divinarum Heres Sit", 43; "De Providentia", ii. 42, 48, etc.). He considers the symposium a detestable, common drinking bout. This can not be explained as a Stoic diatribe, for Philo would not have repeated it in this case. And Philo would have been the last to interpret the Platonic Eros in the vulgar way in which it is explained in the "De Vita Contemplativa", 7 (ii. 480), as he repeatedly uses the myth of double man allegorically in his interpretation of Scripture ("De Opificio Mundi", 24; "De Allegoriis Legum", ii. 24). It must furthermore be remembered that Philo in none of his other works mentions these colonies of allegorizing ascetics, in which he would have been highly interested had he known of them. However, pupils of Philo may subsequently have founded similar colonies near Alexandria that endeavored to realize his ideal of a pure life triumphing over the senses and passions, and they might also have been responsible for the one-sided development of certain of the master's principles. While Philo desired to renounce the lusts of this world, he held fast to the scientific culture of Hellenism, which the author of this book denounces. Although Philo liked to withdraw from the world to give himself up entirely to contemplation and bitterly regretted the lack of such repose ("De Specialibus Legibus", 1 [ii. 299]), he did not abandon the work that was required of him by the welfare of his people.

=== Other works ascribed to Philo ===
- "De Mundo", a collection of extracts from Philo, especially from the preceding work
- "De Sampsone" and "De Jona", in Armenian, published with Latin translation by Jean-Baptiste Aucher.
- "Interpretatio Hebraicorum Nominum", a collection, by an anonymous Jew, of the Hebrew names occurring in Philo. Origen enlarged it by adding New Testament names, and Jerome revised it. See below for the etymology of names occurring in Philo's exegetical works.
- A "Liber Antiquitatum Biblicarum", which was printed in the sixteenth century and then disappeared, has been discussed by Cohn in "J. Q. R." 1898, x. 277–332. It narrates Biblical history from Adam to Saul
- The pseudo-Philonic "Breviarium Temporum", published by Annius of Viterbo

For a list of Philo's lost works, see Schürer, l.c. p. 534.

- "De Incorruptibilitate Mundi". Jakob Bernays has argued convincingly that this work is spurious. Its peripatetic basic idea that the world is eternal and indestructible contradicts all those Jewish teachings that were, for Philo, an indisputable presupposition. Bernays has proved simultaneously that the text has been confused through wrong pagination, and he has cleverly restored it.

== Legacy ==
=== Christianity ===
Although Philo was a Jewish Middle Platonist, his influence on both Platonism and Judaism was limited compared to his adaptation by the early Christian Church fathers. His impact on Platonism was mainly restricted to Christian Middle Platonists such as Clement of Alexandria and Origen, and even potential connections to Numenius of Apamea, a 2nd-century CE Middle Platonist who also wrote on Judaism and was influenced by Pythagoreanism, cannot be definitively proven.

Philo's work was used by Clement, Origen, and Pantaenus in Alexandria to connect the bible with philosophical ideas. His work was seen positively by later Alexandrians Didymus and Isidore, as well as Gregory of Nyssa, and cited extensively by Eusebius of Caesarea, Jerome, and Ambrose. Early Christian writers were especially interested in his paraphrasings of the Bible for their historical apologetics, and his allegorical and Platonic style of exegesis. They continued in Philo's ideas of God as unknowable and unchangeable, man's being made in the image of God endowing him with reason, and his conversion of the ideas of virtue from Greek philosophy to Biblical virtues.

In the fourth century the work of Philo became unpopular due to his ideas becoming associated with Origenism and Arianism, schools of thought seen to be heretical. During this time he was especially unpopular among the Antiochene school of interpretation, most notably by Theodore of Mopsuestia. Direct citations to Philo decreased, but the themes of his work continued to later Christian writers indirectly through the earlier writers inspired by him.

=== Judaism ===
Though never properly attributed, Philo's marriage of Jewish exegesis with Stoicism and Platonism provided a formula later picked up by other Midrash content from the 3rd and 4th centuries. Philo's ideas were further developed by later Judaism in the doctrines of the Divine Word creating the world, the divine throne-chariot and its cherub, the divine splendor and its Shekhinah, the name of God, as well as the names of the angels.

Some claimed this lack of credit or affinity for Philo by the Rabbinic leadership at the time was due to his adoption of allegorical instead of literal interpretations of the Hebrew Bible.

For a long time, Philo was read and analyzed chiefly by Christian authors. Azariah dei Rossi's Me'or Enayim: Imre Binah (1575), one of the first Jewish commentaries on Philo, describes four "serious defects" of Philo: reading the Torah in Greek, not Hebrew; belief in primordial matter rather than creatio ex nihilo; unbelief in the Lord as evidenced by excessively allegorical interpretation of scripture; and neglect of the Jewish oral tradition. Dei Rossi later gives a possible defense of Philo and writes that he can neither absolve nor convict him.

== List of extant works ==
Some 50 works by Philo have survived, and he is known to have written some 20 to 25 further works which have been lost. The following list gives conventional Latin and English titles and abbreviations commonly used in reference works.

Latin title	English title	RGG	Kittel	Stud. Philonica
Apologia pro Judaeis	Hypothetica: Apology for the Jews	apol.	?	Hypoth.
De Abrahamo	On Abraham	Abr.	Abr	Abr.
De aeternitate mundi	On the Eternity of the World	aet.	Aet Mund	Aet.
De agricultura	On Husbandry	agr.	Agric	Agr.
De animalibus	On Animals	anim.	?	Anim.
De Cherubim	On the Cherubim	Cher.	Cher	Cher.
De confusione linguarum	On the Confusion of Tongues	conf.	Conf Ling	Conf.
De congressu eruditionis gratia	On Mating with the Preliminary Studies	congr.	Congr	Congr.
De decalogo	The Decalogue	decal.	Decal	Decal.
De ebrietate	On Drunkenness	ebr.	Ebr	Ebr.
De fuga et inventione	On Flight and Finding	?	Fug	Fug.
De gigantibus	On the Giants	gig.	Gig	Gig.
De Josepho	On Joseph	Jos.	Jos	Ios.
De migratione Abrahami	On the Migration of Abraham	migr.	Migr Abr	Migr.
De mutatione nominum	On the Change of Names	mut.	Mut Nom	Mut.
De opificio mundi	On the creation	opif.	Op Mund	Opif.
De plantatione	Concerning Noah's Work as a Planter	plant.	Plant	Plant.
De posteritate Caini	On the Posterity of Cain and His Exile	post.	Poster C	Post.
De praemiis et poenis	On Rewards and Punishments	praem.	Praem Poen	Praem.
De providentia	On Providence I II	prov.	?	Prov.
De sacrificiis Abelis et Caini	On the Birth of Abel	sacr.	Sacr AC	Sacr.
De sobrietate	On Sobriety	sobr.	Sobr	Sobr.
De somniis	On Dreams I-II	somn.	Som	Somn.
De specialibus legibus	The Special Laws I II III IV	spec.	Spec Leg	Spec.
De virtutibus	On the Virtues	virt.	Virt	Virt.
De vita contemplativa	On the Contemplative Life	cont.	Vit Cont	Contempl.
De vita Mosis	On the Life of Moses I II	Mos.	Vit Mos	Mos.
In Flaccum	Flaccus	Flacc.	Flacc	Flacc.
Legatio ad Gajum	On the Embassy to Gaius	legat.	Leg Gaj	Legat.
Legum allegoriae	Allegorical Interpretation I II III	LA	Leg All	Leg.
Quaestiones in Exodum	Questions and Answers on Exodus	QE	Quaest in Ex	QE
Quaestiones in Genesim	Questions and Answers on Genesis I II III	QG	Quaest in Gn	QG
Quis rerum divinarum heres sit	Who is the Heir of Divine Things	her.	Rer Div Her	Her.
Quod deterius potiori insidiari soleat	Worse is Wont to Attack Better	det.	Det Pot Ins	Det.
Quod Deus sit immutabilis	On the Unchangeableness of God	Deus	Deus Imm	Deus
Quod omnis probus liber sit	Every Good Man is Free	prob.	Omn Prob Lib	Prob.

== Editions and translations ==
- The Works of Philo: Complete and Unabridged. Translated by Charles Duke Yonge. 1854–1855.
- Cohn, Leopold & Paul Wendland, Philonis Alexandrini Opera quæ supersunt (The Surviving Works of Philo of Alexandria) [Greek and Latin]. Berlin: George Reimer.
  - Volumes 1–3 (1896, 1897, 1898)
  - Volumes 4–6 (1902, 1906, 1915)
  - Volume 7 (1926; indexed by Hans Leisegang)
- "Index of Philosophical Writings" (PDF). Documenta Catholica Omnia (in Greek). [Online Greek text of Volumes 1-7 above. Under "Graecum - Greco - Greek" section]
- Philo of Alexandria: An Exegete for His Time. by Peder Borgen. Leiden: Brill. 1997. ISBN 9004103880.
- Philo with an English Translation. Vol. 1–10. Translated by F.H. Colson & G.H. Whitaker. Cambridge, Mass.: Harvard University Press. 1929–62.
- Terian, Abraham, ed. (1981). Philonis Alexandrini de animalibus: The Armenian Text with an Introduction, Translation, and Commentary. Chico, CA: Scholars Press. ISBN 9780891304722.

== See also ==
- Land of Onias
- Cairo Geniza
- Elephantine papyri and ostraca
