= Biblical antiquities =

Biblical antiquities may refer to:

- Biblical archaeology
- Biblical Antiquities of Pseudo-Philo
