= Pseudo-Philo =

Author of Liber Antiquitatum Biblicarum

Pseudo-Philo is the name commonly used for the unknown, anonymous author of the Biblical Antiquities. This text is also commonly known today under the Latin title Liber Antiquitatum Biblicarum (Book of Biblical Antiquities), a title that is not found in the Latin manuscripts. Although probably originally written in Hebrew, it is preserved today only through a Latin translation found in 18 complete and 3 fragmentary manuscripts that date between the eleventh and fifteenth centuries CE. In addition, material paralleling that in the Biblical Antiquities is also found in the Chronicles of Jerahmeel, a 14th-century Hebrew composition. The Latin text of the Biblical Antiquities circulated alongside Latin translations of the authentic writings of Philo of Alexandria. Scholars have long asserted the pseudonymous character of the text now known as the Biblical Antiquities. Primary in this regard is a vastly differing approach to and use of the Jewish scriptures. For the sake of convenience, scholars continue to follow the lead of Leopold Cohn in calling the unknown author "Pseudo-Philo".

== Estimated date of work ==
Most scholars contend that Pseudo-Philo's Biblical Antiquities was written sometime between the mid-first century CE and the mid-second century CE. Some scholars propose that the Biblical Antiquities was written shortly preceding the destruction of Jerusalem and its temple in 70 CE while other scholars suggest that it was written post-70 CE, possibly as late as shortly following the Bar Kokhba revolt (132-136 CE). A very small minority of scholars suggest dates outside these bounds. Examples include Abram Spiro who suggests that it was composed in the second century BCE, J. R. Porter who dates Pseudo-Philo to 25 CE, and Alexander Zeron who posits that it was composed sometime in the third or fourth centuries CE. Among the evidence cited by scholars in support of a pre-70 CE date of composition is the depiction of the temple in Jerusalem as still standing and in use for sacrifices (e.g., LAB 22:8). Further, Daniel J. Harrington writes: 'A date prior to AD 70 is suggested by the kind of Old Testament text used in the book, the free attitude towards the text, the interest in the sacrifices and other things pertaining to cult, and the silence about the destruction of the temple'. Howard Jacobson, for example, treats this view dismissively, stating that "Simply put, there are no particularly cogent arguments in support of a pre-70 date." Among the evidence cited in support of a post-70 CE date of composition are thematic parallels with 2 Baruch and 4 Ezra, Jewish texts composed post-70 CE and references to the destruction of the temple (e.g., LAB 19:7).

== Original language and translational history ==
The scholarly consensus is that Pseudo-Philo's Biblical Antiquities was not composed in Latin but, rather that it was composed in Hebrew and translated into Greek before being translated into Latin by the fourth century CE. The primary evidence for this are the many difficult readings that are best explained by the existence of Hebrew and Greek antecedents.

== Short description of content ==
Pseudo-Philo's Biblical Antiquities is a selective rewriting of Jewish scriptural texts and traditions. Following a basic narrative outline derived from the Jewish Scriptures, the work opens with the creation of the world (LAB 1) and concludes with the death of King Saul (LAB 65). As Leopold Cohn observes, it “passes rapidly over” or “omits” certain aspects of the scriptural narrative while elaborating on others, even supplying “many quite novel additions” not present in the Jewish Scriptures. Many of its additions have parallels in other Jewish traditions.

Some scholars have reasoned that the work's ending with the death of Saul implies there were further parts of the text which are now missing; others believe that the extant text is complete.

=== The work as source of legends ===
It is probably the earliest reference for many later legendary accretions to the Biblical text, such as the casting of Abraham into the fire, Dinah's marriage to Job, and Moses born circumcised. It also contains several other embellishments which deviate quite substantially from the norm, such as Abraham leading a rebellion against the builders of the Tower of Babel (the reason for him being cast into the fire).

It includes a lament about the human sacrifice of Jephthah's daughter, with the daughter being the singer. Commentators have noted that the characterisation of the daughter is (like other female characterisations in Pseudo-Philo) much stronger and more positive than that of her biblical counterpart. She has a name (Seila), and her role is as a wise and willing—rather than passive and reluctant—participant. One commentator has observed that "the author has done his utmost to put this woman on the same level as the patriarchs, in this case especially Isaac".

=== Differences from Philo of Alexandria ===
According to James H. Charlesworth and Daniel J. Harrington, the attribution of Pseudo-Philo to Philo of Alexandria cannot be sustained for four main differences: Philo of Alexandria wrote in Greek, whereas the Pseudo-Philo apparently wrote in Hebrew; "1,652 years from Adam to the Flood (3:6) against Philo's 2,242; the favorable or at least neutral portrayal of Balaam (16) against Philo's negative description; Moses' burial by God (19:16), not by the angels."

== See also ==
- Antiquities of the Jews
- Cairo Geniza
- Elephantine papyri
- Jewish temple at Elephantine
- Land of Onias
- Moses in rabbinic literature

== Bibliography ==
- Pseudo-Philo, P.-M. Bogaert, C. Perrot, J. Cazeaux, and D. J. Harrington. Les Antiquités Bibliques. 2 vols. Sources Chrétiennes 229–230. Paris: Éditions du Cerf, 1976. (Critical text and French translation.) ISBN 2-204-01050-2
- M. R. James. The Biblical Antiquities of Philo. Prolegomenon by L. Feldman. Library of Biblical Studies. New York: Ktav Pub. House, 1971. (English translation.)
- "Pseudo-Philo (First Century A.D.)", translated by D. J. Harrington in The Old Testament Pseudepigrapha, edited by James H. Charlesworth, vol. 2, New York, 1985, 297–377. ISBN 0-385-19491-9
