= Leopold Cohn =

Leopold Cohn may refer to:

- Leopold Cohn (author) (1856–1915), German author and philologist
- Leopold Cohn (Christian clergyman) (1862–1937), founder of the Brownsville Mission to the Jews
