= Louis Massebieau =

- Born: Jean Adolphe Massebieau; 12 June 1840; Nîmes, France
- Died: 22 September 1904 (aged 64); Charenton, France
- Occupation: Historian

Jean Adolphe Massebieau (12 June 1840 – 22 September 1904), known as Louis, was a French Protestant historian and theologian.

In 1877 he became maître de conférences at the Faculté de théologie protestante de Paris. In 1880 he was named maître de conférences at the École pratique des hautes études (section of religious sciences). His daughter, Louise Compain, was a feminist author and co-founder of the feminist movement in France in the late 19th and early 20th centuries.

== Principal works ==
- 1888: Le Traité de la vie contemplative et la question des thérapeutes – Treatise on the contemplative life and the question of therapists.
- 1895: L'Épître de Jacques est-elle l'œuvre d'un chrétien ? – The Epistle of James, is it the work of a Christian?.
- 1878: Les Colloques scolaires du seizième siècle et leurs auteurs : 1480–1570 (reprint 1973) – School conferences of the sixteenth century and their authors (1480–1570).
- 1906: Essai sur la chronologie de la vie et des œuvres de Philon (with Émile Bréhier) – Essay on the chronology of the life and works of Philo.
