= Paul Wendland =

German classical philologist (1864-1915)

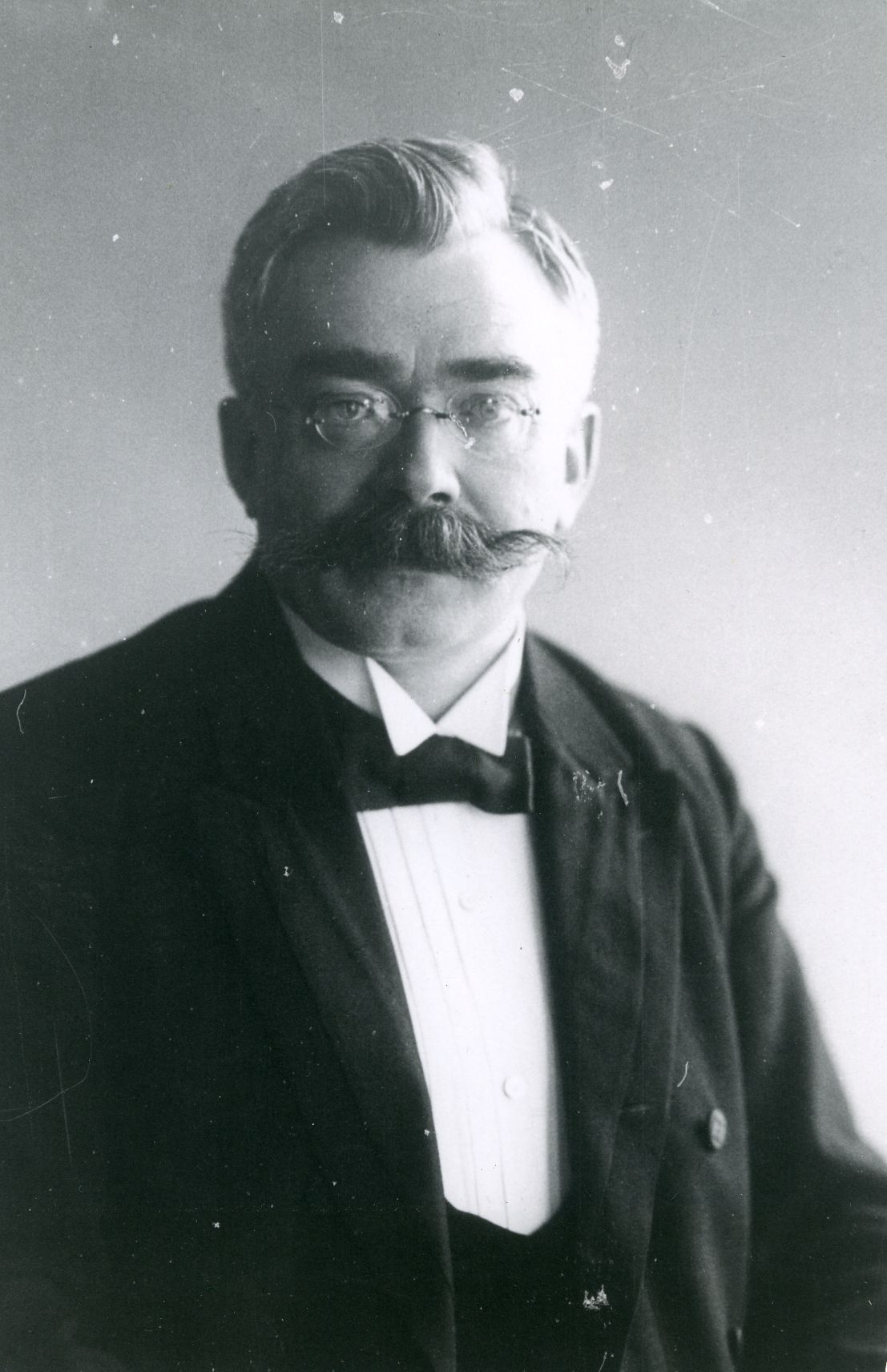
Paul Wendland (1911)

(Johann Theodor) Paul Wendland (August 17, 1864 – September 10, 1915) was a German classical philologist.

Born in Hohenstein, Province of Prussia, he taught as a professor at the Kiel University (from 1902), Breslau University (from 1906), Göttingen University (from 1909).

He was co-author of an edition on Philo of Alexandria, "Philonis Alexandrini opera quae supersunt" (6 volumes, 1896–1915). With Otto Kern, he published "Beiträge zur Geschichte der griechischen Philosophie und Religion" (1895).

He died in Göttingen.

== Literary works ==
- Philosophische Schrift über die Vorsehung, 1892 – Philosophical writings on divine providence.
- Beiträge zur Geschichte der grieschischen Philosophie, 1895 (with Otto Kern) – Contribution to the history of Greek philosophy.
- Anaximenes von Lampsakos, 1905 – Anaximenes of Lampsacus.
- Die hellenistisch-römische Kultur in ihren Beziehungen zu Judentum und Christentum, 1907 – Greco-Roman culture in its relations with Judaism and Christianity.
- Die urchristlichen Literaturformen, 1912 – Early Christian literature forms.
- Die griechische Prosa und die römisch-christliche Literatur, 1912 – Greek prose and Roman-Christian literature.
- Philonis Alexandrini opera quae supersunt, 6 volumes, (with Leopold Cohn), 1896–1915.
