= Jephthah's daughter =

Biblical figure

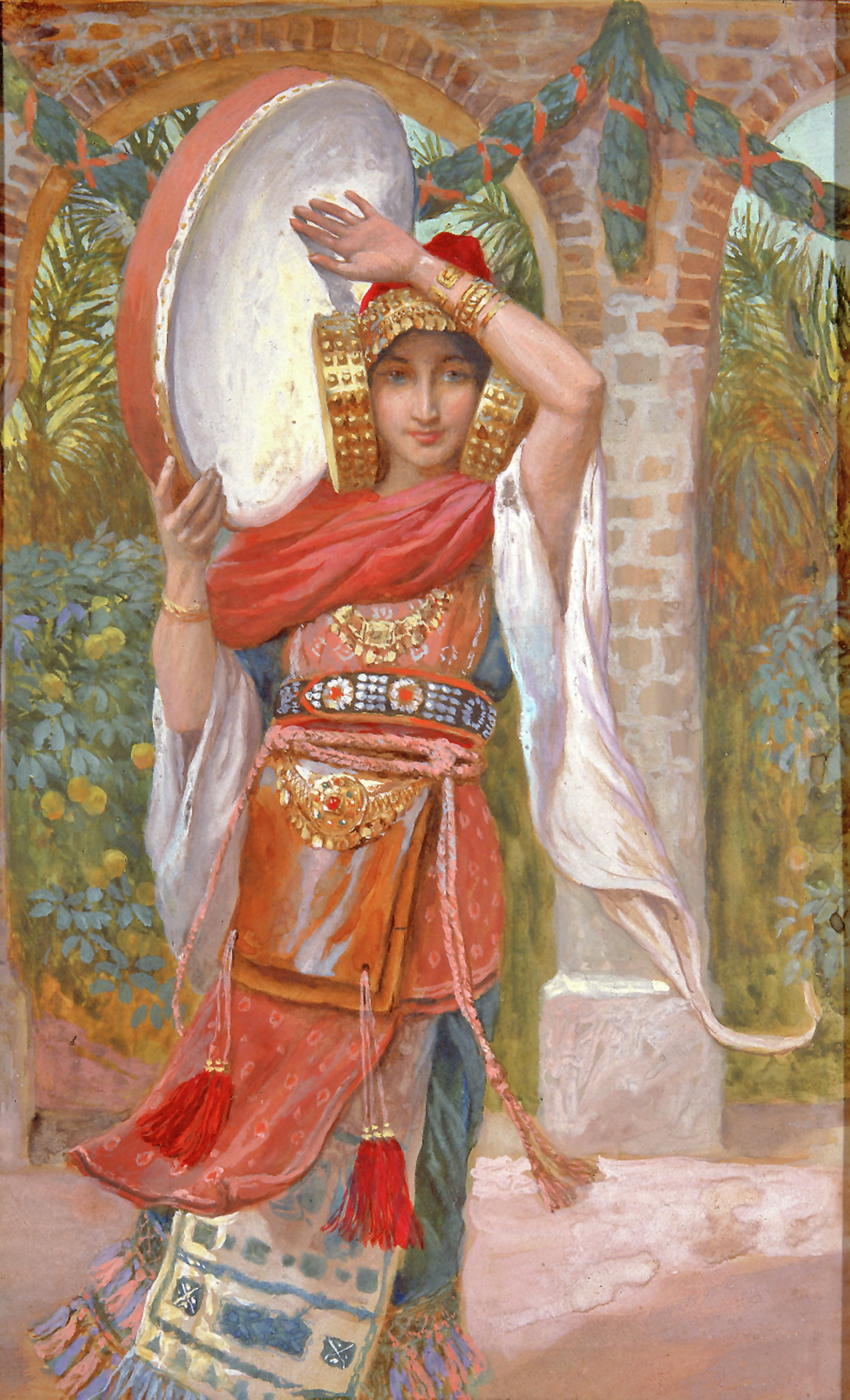
James Tissot, Jephthah's Daughter, c. 1896–1902.

Jephthah's daughter, sometimes later referred to as Seila or Iphis, is a figure in the Hebrew Bible, whose story is recounted in Judges 11. The Israelite judge Jephthah had just won a battle over the Ammonites, and vowed he would give the first thing that came out of his house as a burnt offering to God. However, his only child, an unnamed daughter, came out to meet him dancing and playing a tambourine (Judges 11:34). She encourages Jephthah to fulfill his vow (Judges 11:36) but asks for two months to weep for her virginity (Judges 11:38). After this period of time, Jephthah fulfilled his vow and offered up his daughter.

== Disputed human sacrifice ==
Historically amongst Bible commentators it was held that after she mourned for her virginity in light of the Biblical commandment to "be fruitful and multiply", which she would now no longer be able to fulfill, Jephthah killed his daughter in an act of human sacrifice. This view of a literal burnt sacrifice was held by early interpreters and commentators such as Josephus, Pseudo-Philo, John Chrysostom, Augustine, Ambrose, Jerome, and Rabbinic literature in the Talmud and Midrash.

Later as well by Aquinas and Cornelius a Lapide, while commentators disagreeing with this view included David Kimhi and Levi ben Gershon who argued she remained celibate and isolated living in dedication to God.

In more contemporary scholarship, George F. Moore, Walter C. Kaiser Jr, Daniel I. Block, Barry G. Webb, and John J. Collins believe that in the context the sacrificial view of a human offering is evident, especially with regard to the initial vow. However, there is an opposing opinion that Jephthah's daughter was "offered to the LORD" in the same way Samuel was offered after birth, and spent the rest of her life in seclusion. This is based on considerations arising from the narrative, such as that weeping for her virginity would make no sense if she were about to die. Scholars who support this interpretation include Adam Clarke, E. W. Bullinger, Carl Friedrich Keil and Franz Delitzsch, Gleason Archer, David Marcus and James B. Jordan.

== Later influence ==
Jephthah's daughter was not given a central role in many pre-medieval texts: the major exception was the first-century Liber Antiquitatum Biblicarum of "Pseudo-Philo", which devoted an entire chapter to her (and gave her the name of "Seila"). The French scholar Peter Abelard (d. 1142) praised Seila in his lament Planctus virginum Israel super filia Jephte. In a letter to his lover Héloïse d'Argenteuil, Abelard also portrayed Seila as a model for monastic women who devote their whole lives to God. In other medieval Christian texts, Jephthah's daughter was portrayed as a type of Virgin Mary and her death was likened to the Purification of the Virgin.

In the medieval period, some Jewish communities refrained from drinking water from wells and rivers for a few hours at four key times of the year, a custom called the tekufah. In the twelfth century Rabbi Judah the Pious wrote that the tekufah that fell during the month of Tishre was observed because of Jephthah's daughter.

Jephthah's daughter is called "Adah" by the Order of the Eastern Star and is one of its five heroines, representing obedience to duty.

In the field of Jewish exegesis, the work titled Dirshuni: Contemporary Women's Midrash names Jephthah's daughter as "Tannot" (or "Tanot") and appears in various chapters. The name is derived from the verse in Judges 11:40 "for the maidens of Israel to go every year, for four days in the year, and chant dirges ("tannot") for the daughter of Jephthah the Gileadite."

The story of Jephthah and his daughter was the inspiration for one of the canons of the classical saxophone repertoire: “Jephthah: Invocation & Dance for Soprano and Alto Saxophones and Piano, which was composed by Carl Anton Wirth for the father / daughter Raschèr Duo. Sigurd and Carina Raschèr premiered the work at New York City's Town Hall on November 9, 1958. See: Rascher Duo Project.

In Feminist literature and discourse, Phyllis Trible viewed the account of the unnamed daughter as one of the prime examples of patriarchal violence. She highlights too that in ancient Israelite society, a woman’s identity was centred on marriage and childbearing. The lament in the mountains is a grief ritual of an unfulfilled life, dying before attaining womanhood. J. Cheryl Exum argued that the tragedy was that the daughter actively submits to paternal authority and loses her life.

== See also ==
- Child sacrifice
- Binding of Issac
- Idomeneus
- Iphigenia
- Jephtha (Handel)
- List of names for the biblical nameless
- Polyxena
