= Évelyne Sullerot =

French feminist

- Born: Évelyne Hammel; 10 October 1924; Montrouge, France
- Died: 31 March 2017 (aged 92)

Évelyne Sullerot, née Hammel (French: [evlin sylʁo]; 10 October 1924 – 31 March 2017) was a French feminist. She was the author of many feminist books.

== Early life ==
Évelyne Sullerot was born on 10 October 1924 in Montrouge, France. She was raised in a Protestant family. She was the daughter of André Hammel and Georgette Roustain. Her father, a doctor, made one of the first psychiatric clinics in France. He was Chevalier de la Légion d'honneur. Her mother died of hunger and cold at Valence station in 1943. Both, very religiously committed to Protestantism socially and politically, were given the posthumous title of Righteous Among the Nations, for having saved eleven Jews during the German occupation. She also was the cousin of the resistant Elisabeth Rioux-Quintenelle and the great niece of one of the initiators of the feminist movement in France, Louise Massebiau-Compain.

Hammel, during her year of philosophy, was arrested then judged in Nîmes by the Vichy police force for "antinational propaganda and hostile remarks about the Head of the State" (Pétain). Returning to the German zone of occupation, she entered the French Resistance, and joined the OCMJ (Military and Civilian Organization of Young People).

== Career ==
In 1955, with the gynaecologist Marie-Andrée Weill-Halle, she co-founded Maternité Heureuse, an organisation to promote birth control. In 1967, at Paris Nanterre University, she created the first course in the world based on studies devoted to women: the place of women in political life, while passing by Sociology and Women in the Workplace.

Sullerot was the author of many feminist books. She was awarded Commandeur de la Légion d'honneur and Grand-Officier de l'ordre national du Mérite for her feminism.

== Personal life and death ==
Sullerot had four children with her husband, François Sullerot.

Sullerot died of cancer on 31 March 2017.
