= Louise Compain =

Louise Compain (also known as Louise Massebiau-Compain; 23 April 1869 – 7 December 1941) was a French novelist, journalist, freelance writer, feminist political activist, social reformer, and suffragist. She was the co-initiator of the feminist movement in France in the late nineteenth and early twentieth centuries.

== Biography ==
Mélanie Louise Massebiau was born in Vierzon, France, on 23 April 1869. She was the daughter of Jean Louis Adolphe Massebieau, professor at the Faculty of Protestant Theology in Paris, and Louise Françoise Marie Boissier.

Compain was a member of the French Union for Women's Suffrage. A writer and journalist, she became known at the beginning of the feminist movement by writing successful feminist novels. Compain was a social reformer who supported causes related to women's suffrage, women's unions, and women's labor struggles. According to Charity Organisation Society (London, England, 1899):—

" Compain observes that the humanitarian tendencies of to-day can only attain their end of drawing closer the social bond by really raising the mass of humanity to a higher standard, and that many difficulties would be smoothed away if employers and their dependents stood at a common moral level."

In Paris, October 1888, she married Luc Compain (1864-1889), Associate Professor at the Lycée de Chaumont who died accidentally on 17 November 1889 while preparing a thesis on the history of Geoffrey of Vendôme, published posthumously in 1891.

Compain was the aunt of Georgette Hammel (née Roustain; Righteous Among the Nations), the great-aunt of the feminist sociologist and writer Évelyne Sullerot, and the resistance activist, Élisabeth Quintenelle.

Compain died in December 1941 in Paris.

== Awards ==
- Academy prize for L'un vers l'autre (1903)

== Works ==
- La Femme dans les organisations ouvrières, 1910
- La Vie tragique de Geneviève,1912
- L'Amour de Claire, 1915
- La Grand' Pitié des Campagnes de France, 1917
- Les Portes de la vie spirituelle, 1927
- La Robe déchirée, 1929
- Calendrier de la vie spirituelle ou les étapes de l'âme, 1938
