= Yedidia =

Yedidia, Yedidya, Yedidiah, etc. (Hebrew: יְדִידְיָה, romanized: Yəḏīḏyāh) is both a given name and a surname, the original Hebrew of Jedediah.

- The Hebrew name of the Hellenistic Jewish philosopher Philo of Alexandria
- Yedidia Be'eri (1931–2004), Israeli politician
- Yedidia Shofet (1908–2005), Iranian rabbi
- Yedidya Ya'ari (born 1947), former commander of the Israeli Navy
- Yedidya Eisenshtat, Israeli architect, author of the Anzac Memorial, Israel
- Yedidia Stern (born 1955), Israeli jurist and legal scholar

== See also ==
- Kfar Yedidia, a moshav named after Philo of Alexandria
