= Alexander the Alabarch =

1st century AD Alexandrian Jewish aristocrat and Roman citizen

Alexander Lysimachus the Alabarch (Greek: Άλέξανδρος ό Αλάβαρχος; c. 10 BC – after 41 AD) was an Alexandrian Jewish aristocrat. His brother was the exegete and philosopher Philo of Alexandria.

== Ancestry and family ==
Alexander's family lived in Alexandria, Egypt. Although nothing is known about Alexander's parents, they must have been noble and wealthy, because Josephus reports that Alexander "surpassed all his fellow citizens both in ancestry and in wealth." (Antiquities 20.100). Philo was Alexander's older brother.

Alexander had two sons, Tiberius Julius Alexander and Marcus Julius Alexander. After 41 AD, Alexander and Agrippa I arranged for their children to be married. Alexander's second son Marcus Julius was wed to princess Berenice. Marcus Julius died prematurely without producing any children with Berenice. Tiberius Julius was the Procurator of Judea from 46 to 48 and the Prefect of Egypt from 66 to 69. In 70, he participated in the Siege of Jerusalem as Titus' second-in-command.

It is possible that either Alexander's father or paternal grandfather was granted Roman citizenship by the Roman dictator Julius Caesar. His ancestors and family had social ties and connections to the priesthood in Judea, the Hasmonean dynasty, the Herodian Dynasty, and the Julio-Claudian dynasty in Rome.

== Life ==
Contemporary evidence of Alexander's life only comes from the historian Josephus. There is one reference in The Jewish War and four in Antiquities of the Jews. Alexander's brother Philo only refers to him indirectly in On Animals.

At some unknown date, Alexander was appointed Alabarch of Alexandria. The alabarch was a magistrate responsible for customs in Alexandria. Later Alexander became an administrator for the extensive land estates in Egypt, owned by Antonia Minor. Antonia Minor was a Roman noblewoman, who was the niece of Emperor Augustus and the youngest daughter of the triumvir Mark Antony. Alexander had been a long-time friend of Antonia Minor's youngest child, the future Emperor Claudius.

As an indication of Alexander's great wealth, he had nine gates at the Second Temple in Jerusalem "overlaid with massive plates of silver and gold." (War, 5.205)

In around 32-35 AD, the Herodian Agrippa I was indebted to Rome for 300,000 pieces of silver. (Evans, pp. 578–9) Agrippa escaped Judea and sailed to Alexandria to beg Alexander to loan him 200,000 drachmas. Alexander refused to give the money directly to Agrippa, but agreed to loan Agrippa's wife Cypros the money because Alexander "marvelled at her love of her husband and all her other good qualities." (Antiquities, 18.159-160)

Sometime between 37 and 41 AD, the Emperor Caligula ordered Alexander to be imprisoned in Rome for an unknown reason. This could be connected to Philo's embassy to Caligula in Rome in 39/40. After the death of Caligula in 41, his paternal uncle Claudius became Emperor and he immediately released Alexander from prison. Josephus wrote that Alexander was "an old friend of [Claudius], who had acted as guardian for his mother Antonia." (Antiquities, 19.276)

== Sources ==
=== Josephus ===
- Flavius Josephus. "The Judean War 5.205".
- Flavius Josephus. "The Judean Antiquities 18.159-160".
- Flavius Josephus. "The Judean Antiquities 18.257-260".
- Flavius Josephus. "The Judean Antiquities 19.274-277".
- Flavius Josephus. "The Judean Antiquities 20.100".

=== Other ===
- Singer, Isidore; et al., eds. (1901–1906). "Alexander Lysimachus". The Jewish Encyclopedia. New York: Funk & Wagnalls.
- Evans, Katherine G. (1995). Eugene H. Lovering, Jr. (ed.). "Alexander the Alabarch: Roman and Jew" (PDF). 1995 Seminar Papers. Society of Biblical Literature: 576–594. found at Alexander the Alabarch: Roman and Jew
- Schwartz, Daniel R. (2009). "Philo, His Family, and His Times", in Adam Kamesar, ed, The Cambridge Companion to Philo. Cambridge University Press, 2009. ISBN 978-0-521-86090-1
