= Marcus Julius Alexander =

Alexandrian Jewish merchant (16–44 CE)

Marcus Julius Alexander (16–44 CE), the son of Alexander the Alabarch and brother of Tiberius Julius Alexander, was a distinguished and wealthy Alexandrian Jewish merchant. He was betrothed to Berenice, daughter of Herodian King Agrippa I, but died shortly afterwards and had no children with her.

== Ancestry and family ==
Marcus was born and raised in Alexandria, Egypt. Marcus was born as the second son to Alexander the Alabarch, a wealthy Jewish aristocrat. His older brother was Tiberius Julius Alexander. His paternal uncle was the exegete and philosopher Philo.

He came from an aristocratic family who lived in Alexandria for generations. His ancestors and family were contemporaries to the rule of the Ptolemaic dynasty and the rule of the Seleucid Empire. Marcus came from a family who were noble, honourable and wealthy. It was either his paternal grandfather or paternal great grandfather who was granted Roman citizenship from Roman dictator Gaius Julius Caesar. His ancestors and family had social ties and connections to the Priesthood in Judea; Hasmonean Dynasty; Herodian Dynasty and Julio-Claudian dynasty in Rome.
