= Jedediah =

- Gender: male

Origin
- Origin: Hebrew
- Meaning: beloved of the Lord, friend of God

Other names
- Related names: Jed, Jedd, Jeddy, Jededish, Jedi, Jedidias, Jehdai

Jedediah, or Jedidiah (Hebrew: יְדִידְיָה, romanized: Yəḏīḏyāh) is a Hebrew male given name. Its Hebrew form is Yedidia, meaning "beloved of Jah". In the Hebrew Bible, Jedidiah (Jeddedi in Brenton's Septuagint Translation) was the second or blessing name given by God through the prophet Nathan in infancy to Solomon, second son of King David and Bathsheba.

== People ==
- Jedediah Berry (born 1977), American writer
- Jedediah Bila (born 1979), American writer and commentator
- Jedediah Buxton (1707–1772), English mathematician
- Jedediah Slason Carvell (1832–1894), Canadian businessman and politician
- Jedediah Dupree (born 1979), American fencer and fencing coach
- Jedediah Foster (1726–1779), American judge
- Jedediah M. Grant (1816–1856), American religious leader
- Jedediah Herrick (1780–1847), American general
- Jedediah Hinkle, American politician
- Jedediah Hotchkiss (1828–1899), American educator and topographer
- Jedediah Huntington (1743–1818), American general
- Jedediah Vincent Huntington (1815–1862), American clergyman and novelist
- Jedidiah Morse (1761–1826), American geographer
- Jedidiah Norzi (1560–1626), Italian rabbi
- Jedediah Peck (1748–1821), American politician
- Jedediah Purdy (born 1974), American law professor and writer
- Jedediah Sanger (1751-1829), American politician
- Jedediah Smith (1799–1831), American trader and explorer
- Jedediah K. Smith (1770–1828), American politician
- Jedidiah Strutt (1726–1797), English inventor

== Fictional characters ==
- Jedediah, played by Owen Wilson in the film Night at the Museum
- Jedediah, in the film Mad Max Beyond Thunderdome
- Jebediah Brown, in the Call of Duty franchise in the Zombies storyline of certain games
- Jedediah Cooper, main character in the film Hang 'Em High
- Jebediah Kerman, one of the default astronauts in the spaceflight simulator game Kerbal Space Program
- Jedediah Leland, played by Joseph Cotten in the film Citizen Kane
- Jedidiah Sawyer, a character known as Leatherface in The Texas Chainsaw Massacre film franchise
- Jedediah Shine, a police officer in UK TV series Ripper Street
- Jebediah Springfield, the founder of the eponymous city where The Simpsons is set

== See also ==
- Jedaiah, a 10th century BC priest of ancient Israel
- Jedaiah ben Abraham Bedersi (c. 1270–c. 1340), Jewish poet, physician and philosopher
- Yedidia, a variant
