= Alabarch =

An alabarch was a traditionally Jewish official in Alexandria during the Hellenistic and Roman periods, seemingly responsible for taxation and especially customs at the harbor.

== History ==
The following alabarchs are known by name:

- Alexander the Alabarch
- Tiberius Julius Alexander, son of the preceding
- Demetrius

== Function and etymology ==
"Alabarch" is a Latinization of a Greek title, Ἀλαβάρχης, often described as a corruption of Arabarch (Ἀραβάρχης), meaning "Arab leader".

Professor Samuel Krauss in the 1906 Jewish Encyclopedia suggests that the alabarch was the leader of the Jews in Alexandria, and would have been called "ethnarch" by gentiles including Strabo.

The title of an official who stood at the head of the Jewish population of Alexandria during the Grecian period. [...] Strabo (quoted by Josephus, "Ant." xiv. 7, § 2), who was in Egypt about 24 B.C., calls the governor of the Jews "ethnarch" (ἐθνάρχης), and remarks that he ruled over the Jews as over an autonomous community (Ως ἄν πōλιτείας ἄρχων αὐτōτελōῦς). If the term as used by Strabo is correct, then the Alabarch must have been known among the heathen as ethnarch; so that one would surmise that the term ἀλαβάρχης was used only by the Jews. Strabo's ethnarch is usually identified with the Alabarch, without further question; but Franz is of the opinion ("C. I. G." iii. 291a) that the Alabarch was only a subordinate functionary of the ethnarch. Grätz ("Monatsschrift," xxx. 206) considers the alabarchs to be descendants of the priest Onias, who emigrated to Egypt; and he includes the generals Hilkias and Ananias among the alabarchs, though authority for this is lacking.

He considers the "Arab" etymology unlikely for a term applying to a leader of only the Jewish community and proposes the alternative "alaba" referring to ink from tax records:

The trend of modern opinion is to connect it with the Greek term for ink, ἄλαβα (alaba), taking ink in the sense of writing (scriptura), which, in those days, was a token for tax (vectigal). Such a derivation would imply that the Alabarch was a farmer of taxes, certainly from the time of the Ptolemies; and, judging by inscriptions which give a similar title to an office of the Thebaid in Egypt, he must also have collected the toll on animals passing through the country.

Krauss also mentions an older etymology using ἄλς (hals = sea).

Professor Emil Schürer, however, holds in the 1912 Dictionary of the Bible:

The view that the alabarch was the head of the Jewish community is certainly wrong. He is in all probability identical with the ἀραβάρχης, whose office was that of chief superintendent of customs on the Arabian frontier, i.e. on the east side of the Nile. A 'vectigal Arabarchiæ per Ægyptum atque Augustamnicam constitutum' is mentioned in the Codex Justin. IV. lxi. 9; an inscription found at Koptos contains a tariff fixing 'how much is to be raised by those who farm the ἀποστόλιον [?] at Koptos under the arabarchy'; see the text of this inscription in Bulletin de corresp. hellénique, xx. [1896] 174–176; on the office of the alabarch in general, see the Literature in Schürer, GJV iii. 88 f., and add Wilcken, Greichische Ostraka, i. [1899] 347–351). Perhaps it is the office of the alabarch that is in view when Josephus says that the Romans 'continued (to the Jews of Alexandria) the position of trust given them by the kings, namely, the watching of the river' (c. Apion. ii. 5 fin.: 'maximam vero eis fidem olim a regibus datam conservaverunt, id est fluminis custodiam totiusque custodiæ' [the last word is certainly corrupt]). The 'watching of the river' refers to watching it in the interests of levying customs. In any case the alabarch was not an official of the Jewish community, but a man who held a prominent place in civil life.—Tiberius Alexander, a son of the alabarch Alexander, even reached the highest grades of a Roman military career, although at the expense of renouncing his ancestral religion.

== Examples of usage ==
Philo's brother Alexander was alabarch (customs official) in the 30s A.D., and another Jew, Demetrius (otherwise unknown) held the same post late in Claudius' principate; neither case excites comment from Josephus as unusual. in Smallwood, E. Mary (1976). The Jews Under Roman Rule Leiden. p. 227.

Alexander the Alabarch was inspector-in-chief of customs (alabarch) and not a banker, even if he did occasionally lend sums of money, for instance to his eternally indebted friend, Agrippa I King of Judea. in Modrzejewski, Joseph M (1995) The Jews of Egypt: From Rameses II to Emperor Hadrian Jewish Publication Society. p. 135.
