= Leopold Cohn (author) =

German classical philologist and librarian (1856–1915)

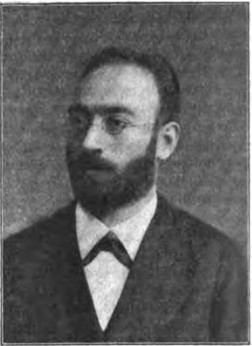
Cohn in 1904.

Leopold Cohn (January 14, 1856 in Zempelburg – November 18, 1915 in Breslau) was a German author and philologist.

He received his education at the gymnasium at Culm, West Prussia, and at the University of Breslau, whence he graduated as doctor of philosophy in 1878.

In 1884, he became privatdozent at the Breslau University.

In 1889, he was appointed librarian, and in 1897 he received the title of professor.

== Works ==
On Greek literature:

- De Aristophane Byzantio et Suetonio Tranquillo Eustathi Auctoribus, Leipzig, 1881
- Untersuchungen über die Quellen der Plato-Scholien, Leipzig, 1884
- De Heraclide Milesio Grammatico, Berlin, 1884
- Zu den Paroemiographen, Breslau, 1887
- Zur Handschriftlichen Ueberlieferung, Kritik und Quellenkunde der Paroemiographen, Leipzig, 1892.

On Jewish literature:

- Philonis Alexandrini Libellus de Opificio Mundi, Breslau, 1889
- Philonis Alexandrini Opera quæ Supersunt (with Paul Wendland), vol. i, Berlin, 1896; vol. ii, ib. 1897; vol. iii, ib. 1898; vol. iv, ib. 1902.

He contributed to The Jewish Quarterly Review (Oct., 1892) "The Latest Researches on Philo of Alexandria," and (ib. 1898) "An Apocryphal Work Ascribed to Philo of Alexandria"; to the "Neue Jahrbücher für Classisches Altertum" (1898, pp. 514–540) "Philo von Alexandria"; and to "Philologus" (1899, Supplement vii, pp. 387–436) "Einteilung und Chronologie der Schriften Philos."

Cohn was the author of the essay on "Griechische Lexikographie," in Handbuch der Klassischen Altertumswissenschaft, 3d ed., ii, part i, Munich, 1900. He also contributed articles on Greek grammarians to Pauly-Wissowa's Real-Encyclopädie der Classischen Altertumswissenschaft.
