= Jerusalem during the Second Temple period =

History of Jerusalem c. 538 BC – 70 CE

- c. 538 BCE – 70 CE
Jerusalem in the Iron Age	Aelia Capitolina
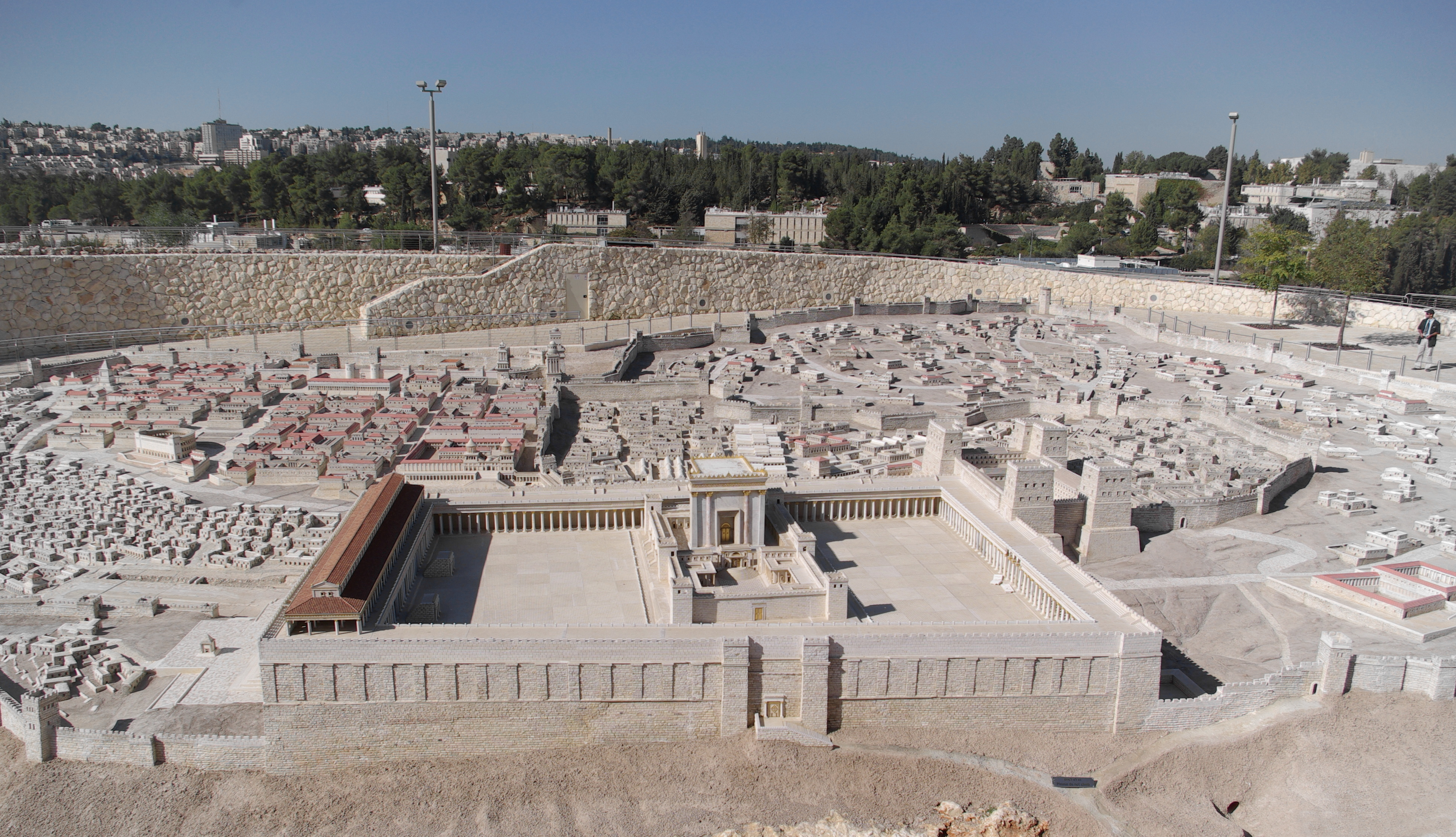
- Holyland Model of Jerusalem showing the city during the first century CE, Israel Museum
- Duration: c. 6 centuries
- Location: Jerusalem, Judea
- Leaders: High priests (autonomous imperial rule); Hasmonean dynasty; Herodian dynasty; Roman governors
- Key events: Return to Zion; Maccabean Revolt; Hasmonean Civil War; Siege of Jerusalem (63 BC); Siege of Jerusalem (37 BC); Construction of Herod's Temple; Crucifixion of Jesus; Zealot coup in Jerusalem; Siege of Jerusalem (70 CE)

Jerusalem during the Second Temple period describes the history of the city during the existence there of the Second Temple, from the return to Zion under Cyrus the Great (c. 538 BCE) to the siege and destruction of the city by Titus during the First Jewish–Roman War in 70 CE. During this period, which saw the region and city change hands several times, Jerusalem was the center of religious life for all Jews; even those who lived in the diaspora prayed towards Jerusalem on a daily basis and went there on pilgrimage during three annual religious festivals. Under Hasmonean and Herodian rule, Jerusalem served as a royal capital and the seat of all major national institutions. In Jerusalem, the Pharisees of Second Temple Judaism developed into the Tannaim and Judaism's post-Exilic religious identity as it continues today, and the Hebrew Bible was perhaps canonized, although exactly when this occurred remains disputed. It was also in Jerusalem during the later stages of this period that Christianity was born.

The 600 years of the Second Temple period can be divided into several periods, each with its own distinct political and social characteristics. The physical development of the city was greatly affected by the changing characteristics of each era, while at the same time influencing these periods themselves. The city's population was characterized by social stratification, both economic and religious, which grew more pronounced over the years. There existed in the city, for example, a clear distinction between a rich and cosmopolitan elite and the wider, more conservative population. Social strata also encompassed different religious outlooks, each with its different emphasis: some reliant on the Temple priests, while the majority were led by traditional non-priestly families, emphasizing Torah study and the development of law over the formal hierarchy established in the Temple.

== Persian period (539–332 BCE) ==
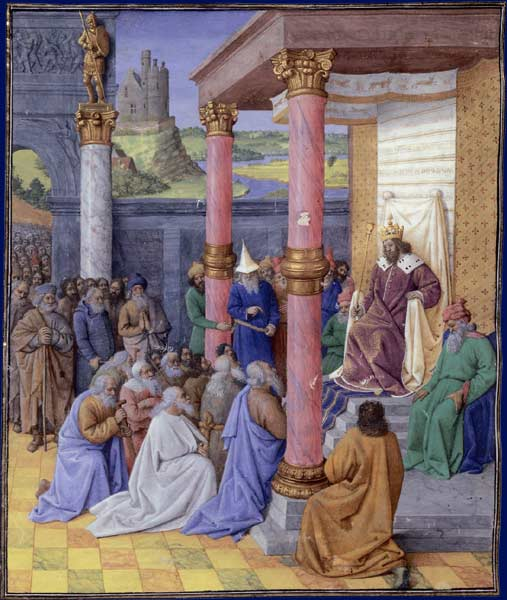
Cyrus the Great allows the Jews to return to Zion. Jean Fouquet, 1470.

At the time of the return to Zion from the Babylonian captivity, Jerusalem was very small and materially rather poor. Its walls were derelict and a modest shrine now stood at the site of Solomon's once grand Temple. The city, nevertheless, enjoyed a vibrant and flourishing religious life. It was at this time that the first Mishnas were written up and both the Bible and the Halakha began to take their modern form. The same time witnessed the emergence of a dominant priestly class, a cosmopolitan elite receptive to foreign influences.

Compared to the late First Temple period, the territory of Jerusalem during the Persian period was significantly smaller, as it had shrunk to its pre-eighth century BCE size. The population of the city's inhabited areas—the City of David and the Temple Mount—was roughly 1500. In addition to the nearby fields and unwalled settlements, Jerusalem had a population of about 3000 people.

=== Political state ===
During the Babylonian period the centre of Judah had shifted northward to Benjamin; this region, once a part of the kingdom of Israel, was far more densely populated than Judah itself, and now held both the administrative capital, Mizpah, and the major religious centre at Bethel. Mizpah continued as the provincial capital for over a century. The position of Jerusalem before the administration moved back from Mizpah is not clear, but from 445 BCE onwards it was once more the main city of Yehud, with walls, a temple (the Second Temple) and other facilities needed to function as a provincial capital, including, from 420 BCE, a local mint striking silver coins.

The Persians may have experimented at first with ruling Yehud as a client kingdom under descendants of Jehoiachin, who had kept his royal status even in captivity. Sheshbazzar, the governor of Yehud appointed by Cyrus in 538, was of Davidic origin, as was his successor (and probable nephew) Zerubbabel; Zerubbabel in turn was succeeded by his second son and then by his son-in-law, all of them hereditary Davidic governors of Yehud, a state of affairs that ended only around 500 BCE. This hypothesis—that Zerubbabel and his immediate successors represented a restoration of the Davidic kingdom under Persian overlordship—cannot be verified, but it would be in keeping with Persian policy in other parts of the Persian Empire, such as Phoenicia.

The second and third pillars of the early period of Persian rule in Yehud were the institutions of High Priest and Prophet, preserved in the Hebrew Bible in the histories of Ezra–Nehemiah and the Books of Chronicles as well as the books of the prophets Zechariah, Haggai and Malachi. But by the mid-5th century BCE the prophets and Davidic kings had disappeared, leaving only the High Priest. The practical result was that after c.500 BCE Yehud became in practice a theocracy, ruled by a line of hereditary High Priests. Alongside the High Priest was the Persian governor, apparently usually a local, charged primarily with keeping order and seeing that tribute was paid. He would have been assisted by various officials and a body of scribes, but there is no evidence that a popular assembly existed, and he would have had little discretion over his core duties. Evidence from seals and coins suggests that most, if not all, of the governors of Persian Yehud were Jewish, a situation which conforms with the general Persian practice of governing through local leaders.

=== Social and religious state ===
Judah during the 9th and 8th centuries BCE was basically polytheistic, with Yahweh operating as a national god in the same way that surrounding nations each had their own national gods. The Exile allowed the worship of "Yahweh-alone" to emerge as the dominant theology of Yehud, while the "sons of Yahweh" of the old pantheon evolved into angels and demons in a process that continued into the Hellenistic age.

Possibly the single most important development in the post-Exilic period was the promotion and eventual dominance of the idea and practice of Jewish exclusivity, the idea that the Jews, meaning followers of the god of Israel and of the law of Moses, were, or should be, a race apart from all others. This was a new idea, originating with the party of the golah, those who returned from the Babylonian exile; behind the biblical narrative of Nehemiah and Ezra lies the fact that relations with the Samaritans and other neighbours were in fact close and cordial: comparison between Ezra–Nehemiah and the Books of Chronicles bears this out: Chronicles opens participation in Yahweh-worship to all twelve tribes and even to foreigners, but for Ezra–Nehemiah "Israel" means Judah and Benjamin alone, plus the holy tribe of Levi.

=== Urban landscape ===
Persian-era Jerusalem was very small: about 1,500 inhabitants, even as low as 500 according to some estimates. Archaeologist Magen Broshi estimated the population of Jerusalem around 333 BCE at 4,500 people, compared to 25,000 under King Hezekiah in the late 8th century BCE. During the Persian period, Jerusalem was the only true urban site in Yehud, the bulk of the province's population living in small unwalled villages. This picture did not much change throughout the entire Persian period, the entire population of the province remaining around 30,000. There is no sign in the archaeological record of massive inwards migration from Babylon. The urban area did not include the western hill (containing the Jewish, Armenian and Christian Quarters of modern Jerusalem), which had been inside the walls before the Babylonian destruction.

The Bible describes the construction of a wall by Nehemiah. In November 2007 archaeologist Eilat Mazar announced the discovery of fortifications in area G on the eastern fringes of the City of David, which she dates to Nehemiah's time; Mazar's findings, however, are disputed by other archaeologists.

The biblical Book of Ezra also describes the construction of a new temple (the Second Temple) by returning exiles from Babylon.

== Hellenistic period (332–164 BCE) ==
The conquest by Alexander the Great in 332 BCE ushered in the Hellenistic period, which would last until the Maccabean Revolt in 167 BCE. Hellenistic Jerusalem was characterized by a growing gap between the Hellenized elites who adopted Greek culture and the city's observant population, a gap that would eventually lead to the Maccabean Revolt. For most of the Hellenistic period, however, Jerusalem was quite prosperous. It had a measure of autonomy in managing its own affairs and was eventually awarded the status of a polis.

=== Political state ===
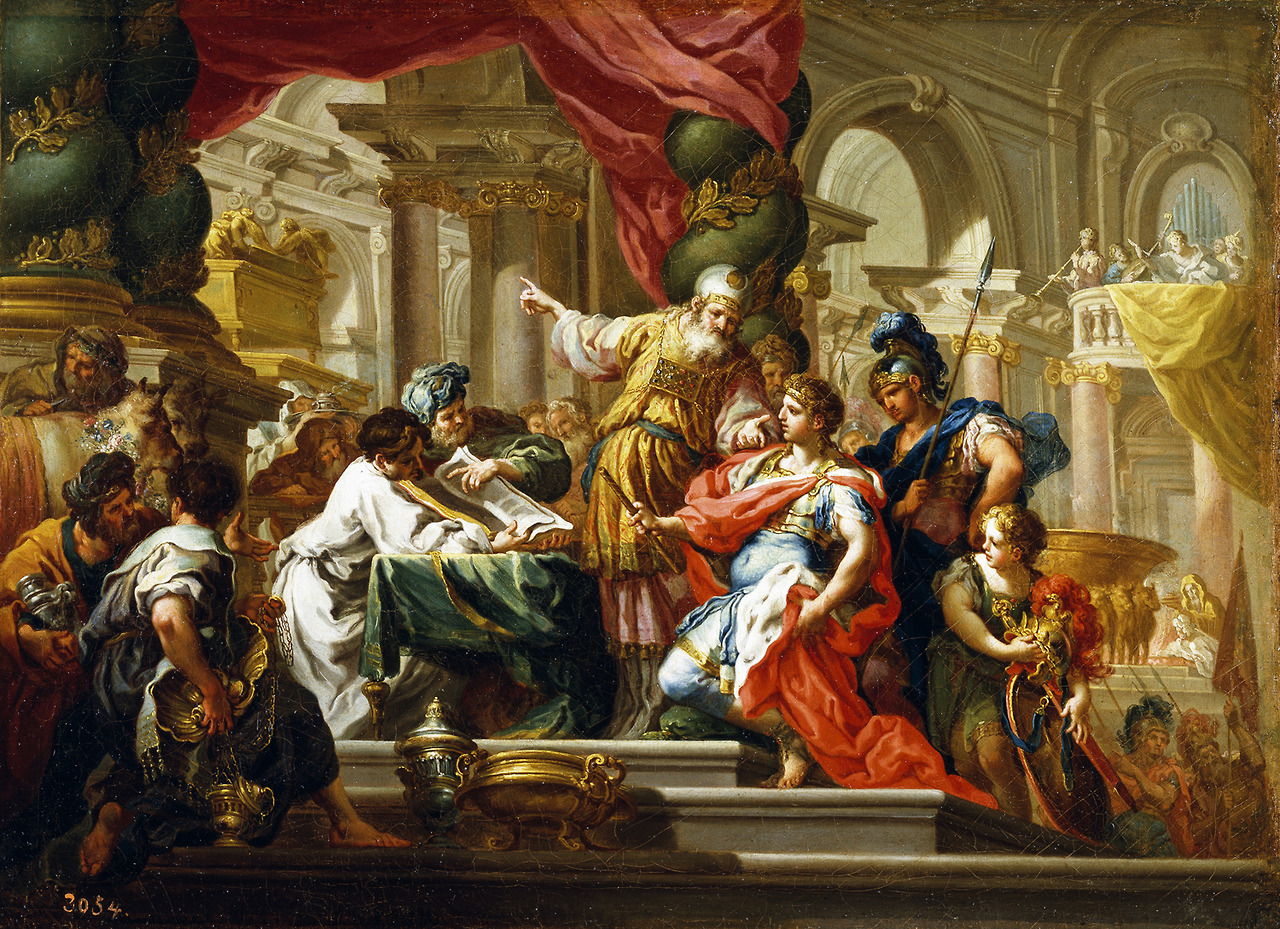
Alexander the Great in the Temple of Jerusalem. Sebastiano Conca, circa 1750.

Alexander the Great conquered the region in 332 BCE and according to several Jewish traditions even visited Jerusalem. After his death the region known as Coele-Syria was contested by the Diadochi and their successor states. Between 301 and 198 BCE the Land of Israel was under the rule of Ptolemaic Egypt, but in 198 BCE it passed to the Seleucid Empire.

The Ptolemaic dynasty allowed Jews to manage their own affairs, without significant intervention by the government. Leadership was awarded to the High Priest, as is found in the account of Hecateus of Abdera, written around 300 BCE and quoted in Diodorus Siculus' Bibliotheca historica:

For this reason the Jews never have a king, and authority over the people is regularly vested in whichever priest is regarded as superior to his colleagues in wisdom and virtue.

— Diodorus Siculus, 40.3.1–3

In 198 BCE Antiochus III conquered Jerusalem, aided by the city's Jewish population. At the beginning of the Seleucid occupation, Antiochus granted the Jews a charter allowing Jewish autonomy and the return of Jews to Jerusalem, gave certain privileges to the priests, forbade foreigners and impure animals from the Temple precinct, and allocated official funds for religious practices in the Temple (the acquisition of sacrifices, oil and incense).

It was under Seleucid rule, however, that the effects of Hellenization became more pronounced. These were most sharply felt under Antiochus IV Epiphanes, who came to power in 175 BCE. In 167 BCE, with tensions between Hellenized and observant Jews at their peak, Antiochus outlawed Jewish rites and traditions and desecrated the Temple, sparking off the Maccabean Revolt.

=== Social and religious state ===
The influence of Hellenistic culture was already felt during Ptolemaic rule, a trend which only increased with the Seleucid conquest. Hellenic customs were especially popular among traders and the wealthy, those who could benefit most from imperial trade and the common language, customs and culture shared by all Hellenistic poleis. This did not necessarily mean they renounced Judaism, but there did exist a growing and discernible gap between these and their observant brethren. As identification with Greek culture could not have been uniform, some scholars maintain that the Hellenized party mentioned in accounts of the Maccabean revolt were most likely only the most extreme of Hellenized Jews, those who not only adopted the external trappings of Greek culture, but had also internalized its values and were willing to give up the basic tenets of the Jewish faith.

In 175 BCE, Jason (Greek name, previous name was Jesus which is Greek for Joshua), brother of high priest Onias III, petitioned Antiochus IV to take his brother's place. He also sought to turn Jerusalem into a Polis, seeking to build both a gymnasium and an ephebeion in the city. In return for a bribe, Jason's petition was granted. Onias fled and his son, Onias IV, established the Temple of Onias in Egypt. The Polis status was beneficial to the affluent elite whose members could stand for election in the various civic institutions. Turning Jerusalem into a Polis, therefore, further enhanced the status of the wealthy Hellenized elite, successors of the assimilated elites hostile to Ezra and Nehemiah. By now, however, a substantial change had taken place from those earlier days. The economic and priestly elites had grown closer, so much so that in the Hellenistic period the priests were themselves a central part of the Hellenized upper stratum of Jerusalem society. While Gentile cities throughout the region adopted Hellenism with zeal, the majority of Jerusalem's population rejected Greek customs. Jason took no explicit steps against the Jewish faith and the Temple continued to function as usual, with no pagan sacrifices nor the introduction of foreign idols. There was, nevertheless, great unrest among the learned at the fact that the office of high priest and supreme leader was being held by one who had so utterly distanced himself from the faith.

In the early 2nd century BCE, therefore, a rift existed in Jerusalem between an economically weak, observant majority lacking civic rights, and a small Hellenized minority closely linked to the Seleucid authorities and in control of the economy, trade, local administration and even the Temple itself. Tensions were exacerbated by Antiochus' edicts against the Jewish faith, especially those introducing idol worship in the Temple and banning circumcision, and in 167 BCE a rural priest, Mattathias of Modi'in, led a rebellion against the Seleucid Empire.

=== Urban landscape ===
Little is known of Jerusalem's urban landscape in the Hellenistic period. Least is known of the 3rd century BCE when the city was under Ptolemaic rule. One source providing an insight into Jerusalem of the period are the writings of Hecateus of Abdera who lived at the end of the 4th century BCE. Hecateus was in the entourage of Ptolemy I Soter, founder of the Ptolemaic Kingdom, when he met a group of Jewish exiles who had voluntarily left for Egypt. Hecateus' writings praise the character, education and political talents of the head of this group, a priest named Hezekiah, who was apparently the source of Hecateus' information about both Jerusalem and Jewish customs. Jerusalem is praised as both big and beautiful, as the only fortified city in Judea, as large as 50 stadions and inhabited by 120,000 Jews. Hecateus described the Temple standing in the middle of the city (an indication he had not seen it himself), its dimensions, mentions the eternal flame, the altar and the Menorah. Hecateus also emphasized the lack of any idols or a sacred grove and the prohibition on priestly consumption of wine in the hall.

Another source purporting to describe Ptolemaic Jerusalem is the Letter of Aristeas, an account of the translation into Greek of the Septuagint. The author, supposedly an Alexandrian Jew in the service of Ptolemy II Philadelphus (309–246 BCE), describes a visit to the city, including the Temple Mount and the adjacent citadel, the Ptolemaic Baris. The Letter of Aristeas, however, is apparently a later creation of the mid 2nd century BCE. It most likely dates to the Seleucid or Hasmonean periods, nor is there any certainty that it is a genuine eyewitness account.

Both 1 & 2 Maccabees and Flavius Josephus' Antiquities of the Jews tell of a building boom during Seleucid rule. Jason, turning Jerusalem into a Polis, also constructed the constituent architectural elements of a Greek city, including a Gymnasium and an Ephebion. Since the earliest day of archaeology in Jerusalem, great efforts have been invested in locating and identifying these buildings, but to no avail. A prime example is the attempt to locate the Acra, the citadel established by Antiochus IV Epiphanes to house the Seleucid garrison in Jerusalem.

=== Rural hinterland ===
While major public buildings inside the city remain difficult to find, modern archaeology has provided a clearer picture of Jerusalem's surrounding countryside and daily economy during this Early Hellenistic period. Archaeological surveys show that the countryside within a two-hour walk of the city was quite sparsely populated at the time, with only about 15 small farms and rural estates active (including early layers at sites like Qalandiya, Nebi Samuel, and Ramat Rachel). Despite this small local setup, the items discovered by archaeologists reveal that Jerusalem was deeply connected to international trade networks under Ptolemaic and early Seleucid rule. Excavations in these rural areas have uncovered a large amount of high-quality imported tableware and stamped handles from Mediterranean wine jars, especially from the Greek island of Rhodes, showing that the capital and its neighbors relied heavily on imported luxury goods before the outbreak of the Maccabean Revolt.

== Hasmonean rule (164–63 BCE) ==
The Hasmonean period in Jerusalem was characterized by great contrasts: independence and sovereignty, territorial expansion and material prosperity on the one hand, civil wars and a growing social gap on the other. Jerusalem, now the capital of an independent entity, prospered and grew. Various public buildings and government institutions were built. Traditional Jewish pilgrimages contributed to her economic stature and increased immigration, from home and abroad, made her grow in both population and size. Jerusalem became a bustling political, religious, creative and cultural center - both Jewish and Hellenistic.

=== Political state ===
Although the Maccabean Revolt broke out in 167 BCE and the Temple was purified from pagan influences in 164 BCE, Jerusalem nevertheless remained dominated by the Seleucid garrison which held out in the Acra for a further 25 years. Only in 141 BCE did Simon Maccabaeus occupy the Acra and, according to Josephus, raze it to the ground. From 140 BCE to 63 BCE Jerusalem was the capital of first an independent state and then an independent kingdom. As attested in 1 Maccabees, it began its own year count, distinct from the Seleucid system:

In the one hundred and seventieth year the yoke of the Gentiles was removed from Israel, and the people began to write in their documents and contracts, "In the first year of Simon the great high priest and commander and leader of the Jews."

— 1 Maccabees 13, 41–42.

Simon's appointment was made possible by a consensus among the clergy, religious leaders, traditional aristocratic families and esteemed elders. To emphasize popular legitimacy and support for his appointment, Simon established a grand tribunal which would later be known as the Great Sanhedrin. The Hasmonean leader was at once the high priest (despite not being thought to be of the Zadok family), the supreme military leader as well as the Nasi of the Jews. For the first time, both religious and political leadership rested with one man.

The Maccabees were able to exploit the internal conflicts plaguing both Seleucid and Ptolemaic kingdoms to expand the territory under their control. Jerusalem evolved from the capital of a small Jewish province into one commanding a large territory, home to various peoples. This growth brought about a decisive change in leadership when Judas Aristobulus declared himself king. Aristobulus, his brother Alexander Jannæus and their successors, were in effect priestly kings, yielding considerable influence in both domestic and international affairs. They controlled an area similar in size to modern day Israel, including parts of Transjordan. In 161 BCE Judas Maccabeus had also secured an alliance with the Roman Republic, an alliance which would last up to Jannæus' reign, successive leaders renewing it and adopting a pro-Roman policy. Jannæus, however, chose to discontinue the alliance, apparently because the Seleucid threat to Judean independence had disappeared only to be replaced by a Roman one.

There is evidence to indicate that the Hasmonean kingdom converted subject peoples to Judaism, including the Itureans in the Golan and the Hauran and the Edomites of the Judean hills, underscoring the kingdom's status as a regional power. The new converts were considered, at least in theory, full Jews deserving the equal rights afforded to citizens of the kingdom. Several Edomites, for example, were even to reach senior positions in the administration in Jerusalem.

In 67 BCE a quarrel broke out between Aristobulus II and Hyrcanus II, sons and successors of Alexander Jannæus. Both parties appealed to Roman general Gnaeus Pompeius Magnus (Pompey the Great), who was campaigning in the region at the time, for his assistance. Pompey decided to side with Hyrcanus (and his adviser Antipater), and Aristobulus and his followers barricaded themselves in the Temple Mount. In 63 BCE Pompey and the Roman army arrived in Jerusalem, besieged the Temple and then took it by storm, bringing an end to Jewish sovereignty. In 40 BCE, the Roman Senate granted Herod, Antipater's son, the title of King of Judea. Aided by Roman troops, Herod took Jerusalem from Antigonus II Mattathias, ending Hasmoean rule.

=== Social and religious state ===
It was during Hasmonean rule that two conflicting religious factions, the Sadducees and the Pharisees, took form in Jerusalem. The Sadducees were composed mainly of members of the upper strata of Jerusalem society which included most of the priestly families, especially those receptive to Greek culture. They were centered on the Temple and their main religious concerns were those of religious impurity and Temple rituals. The Pharisees, by contrast, were led by sages and were more socially oriented, advocating the cause of the disadvantaged. Their main interests lay with Torah law and its practical application in daily life. Pharisaic interpretation of the Torah was independent of the Temple, as it fostered religious thought independent of the priestly hierarchy. The Pharisees were led by the Zugot.

Although the leaders of the Maccabean Revolt were fiercely anti-Hellenistic, by the second generation of Hasmonean leaders (c. 130 BCE, the time of John Hyrcanus) Greek culture was once again becoming popular. The Hasmoneans themselves became Hellenized, adopting at the very least the external trappings of Greek culture, administration, clothing and speech. This is particularly evident in the adoption of Greek names. While the first generation Hasmoneans were named John, Jonathan, Judah and the like, later leaders were called Hyrcanus, Aristobulus, Alexander and such. King Alexander Jannæus, in particular, emphasized the Hellenistic nature of his kingdom. He backed the Sadducees and rejected Pharisaic demands to separate the role of king from that of the high priest. Expelling the Pharisees from the Sanhedrin, Jannæus triggered a civil war in which he made use of gentile mercenaries against the Pharisees. Josephus (The Jewish War 1, 4) reported fifty thousand casualties in this civil war, which only ended through mediation by Simeon ben Shetach who was both a Pharisaic leader, Chief of the Court of the Sanhedrin, and brother to queen Salome Alexandra, Jannæus' wife and successor. Under Salome some equilibrium was briefly restored between the monarchy and the Pharisees who controlled the Sanhedrin, but factional rifts reasserted themselves after her death, eventually leading to a state of constant civil war.

=== Urban landscape ===
Lift up your eyes and look about you: All assemble and come to you; your sons come from afar, and your daughters are carried on the arm.

— Isaiah 60, 4.

Now the capital of an independent entity, Jerusalem of the Hasmonean period grew in size, population and wealth. Not only did ritual pilgrimages to the city intensify, but an influx of people from both home and abroad saw the resident population grow as well. City limits expanded and new fortifications were built. The urban landscape of Jerusalem came to reflect its status as a national capital, home to a dynastic royal family. New palaces were built, as were the institutions required to run the kingdom. Magen Broshi estimates the population of Jerusalem under the Hasmonaeans to have been around 30,000–35,000 people.

==== Hasmonean walls and fortifications ====
With Jewish independence restored in the mid 2nd century BCE, the Hasmoneans quickly launched an effort to populate and fortify the Upper City, the western hill abandoned after the Babylonian sacking of Jerusalem. According to 1 Maccabees 10, 10–11, "Jonathan dwelt in Jerusalem and began to rebuild and restore the city. He directed those who were doing the work to build the walls and encircle Mount Zion with squared stones, for better fortification; and they did so.", while according to chapter 13, 10, Simon Maccabeus "assembled all the warriors and hastened to complete the walls of Jerusalem, and he fortified it on every side." These date the construction of the Hasmonean city wall, also known as the first wall, between 142 and 134 BCE. Encompassing the City of David and the western hill, the walls were not entirely new but also incorporated elements of the earlier fortifications, such as the Iron Age "Israelite Tower" unearthed in the Jewish quarter. The wall stretched from the Tower of Hippicus (near the site of the modern Tower of David) eastward toward the Temple Mount, and south to the Southwestern Hill (modern Mount Zion, a misnomer), then east to the Pool of Siloam, and finally north, meeting the wall of the Temple Mount.

Remains of the first wall can still be seen in several places:

- In the citadel known as the Tower of David.
- In Mamilla, west of the contemporary city walls, where remains of Hasmonean fortifications were unearthed.
- In the Jewish Quarter, in and around the "Israelite Tower" and the remains of what may have been the "Gennath gate" mentioned by Josephus.
- At the base of the eastern wall of the Temple Mount.

Once the walls were complete, the Upper City became the residence of Jerusalem's rich and affluent citizens.

==== Fortress palaces ====
Hasmonean Jerusalem featured two major landmarks of which no remains have been found. One of these was the Hasmonean Baris, a citadel which is thought to have stood at the northwestern corner of the Temple Mount, occupying the probable site of the earlier Ptolemaic Baris and which was later demolished to make room for Herod's Antonia Fortress. According to Josephus "this citadel was built by the kings of the Asamonean race, who were also high priests before Herod, and they called it the Tower, in which were reposited the vestments of the high priest, which the high priest only put on at the time when he was to offer sacrifice." Herod's construction of the Antonia left no trace of the Hasmonean citadel.

The other notable structure researchers have been trying to locate is the Hasmonean Palace. Josephus' description is quite precise: "over the gallery, at the passage to the upper city, where the bridge joined the Temple to the gallery." It is quite possible, therefore, to locate the approximate position of the palace, in front of the Temple slightly north of the modern Jewish Quarter. This location would make both topographic (on a lofty spot) and administrative (adjacent to the wealthy and priestly quarters in the upper city) sense. Overlooking the Temple, it would provide the king and high priest an observation point into events there within.

==== Hasmonean burial ====
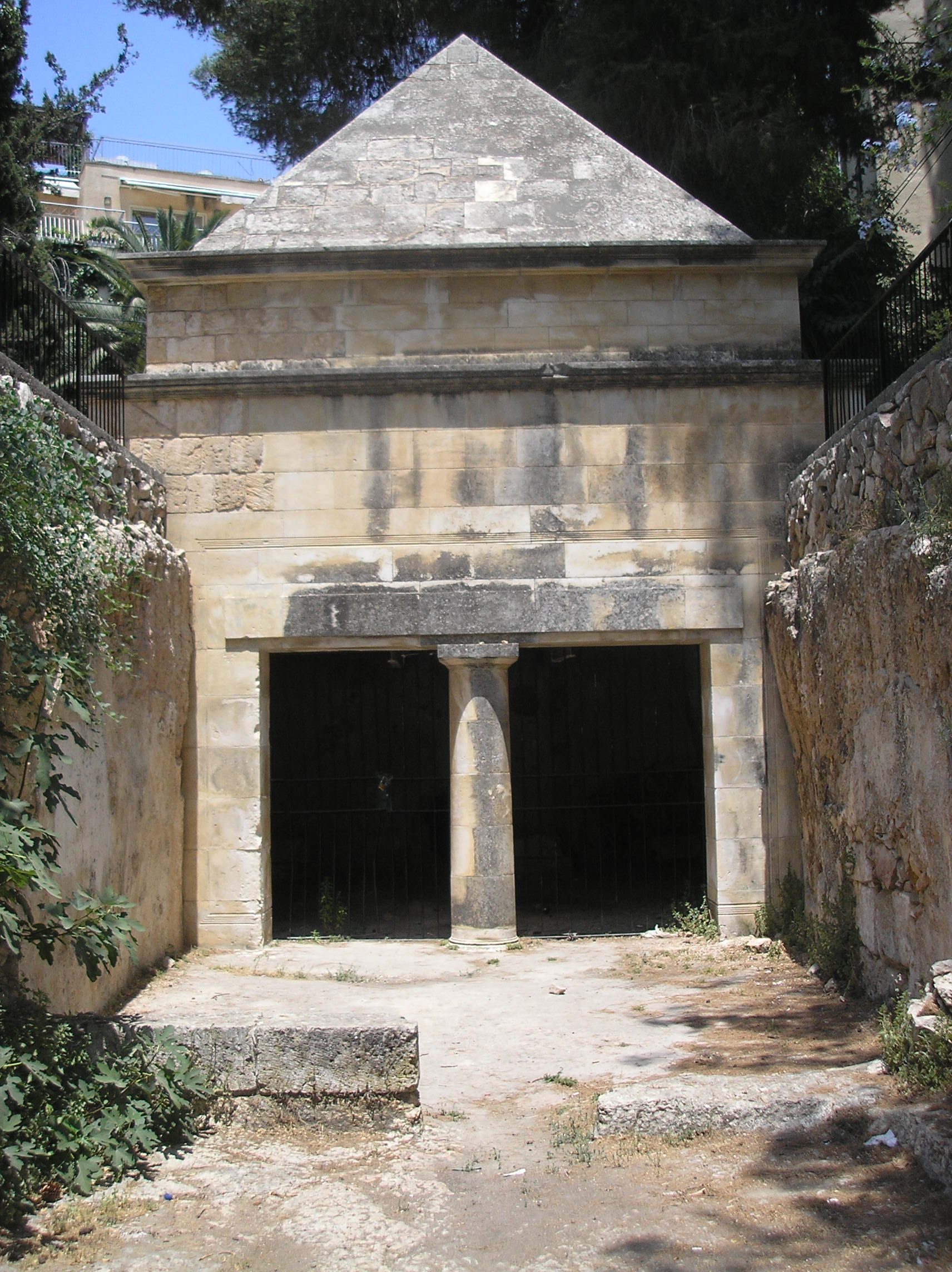
Jason's Tomb

Jerusalem of the Second Temple period was surrounded by cemeteries and grave fields. Due to the sanctity of the city and the ritual impurity of the dead, burial was permitted only at reasonable distance from the city walls:

Carrion, graves and tanyards must be kept fifty cubits from a town.

— Babylonian Talmud: Tractate Baba Bathra 2, 9.

When the city expanded, cemeteries were accordingly relocated. Jewish belief in resurrection meant that the bones of every individual were kept separately. The dead were initially interred in burial caves for a year; when only the bones remained, these were given a secondary burial in an ossuary.

A unique ossuary decoration style depicting flowers, especially lilies, and the branches of palm trees was developed in Jerusalem. The ossuaries were then placed in family burial caves, either rock-hewn or manually built. Hundreds of burial caves from the Second Temple Jerusalem are strewn around the city, mainly to the north (Sanhedria), east (the slopes of the Kidron Valley), and south of the Old City (Gehenna and Ketef Hinnom), and constitute a Necropolis. A few graves have also been found west of the old city, mainly along Gaza Street and in Rehavia. Prominent and affluent families, such as the priestly Bnei Hazir, built luxurious burial halls in which their ossuaries were placed. Jason's Tomb in Rehavia and the Tomb of Absalom are prime examples.

==== Hasmonean water works ====
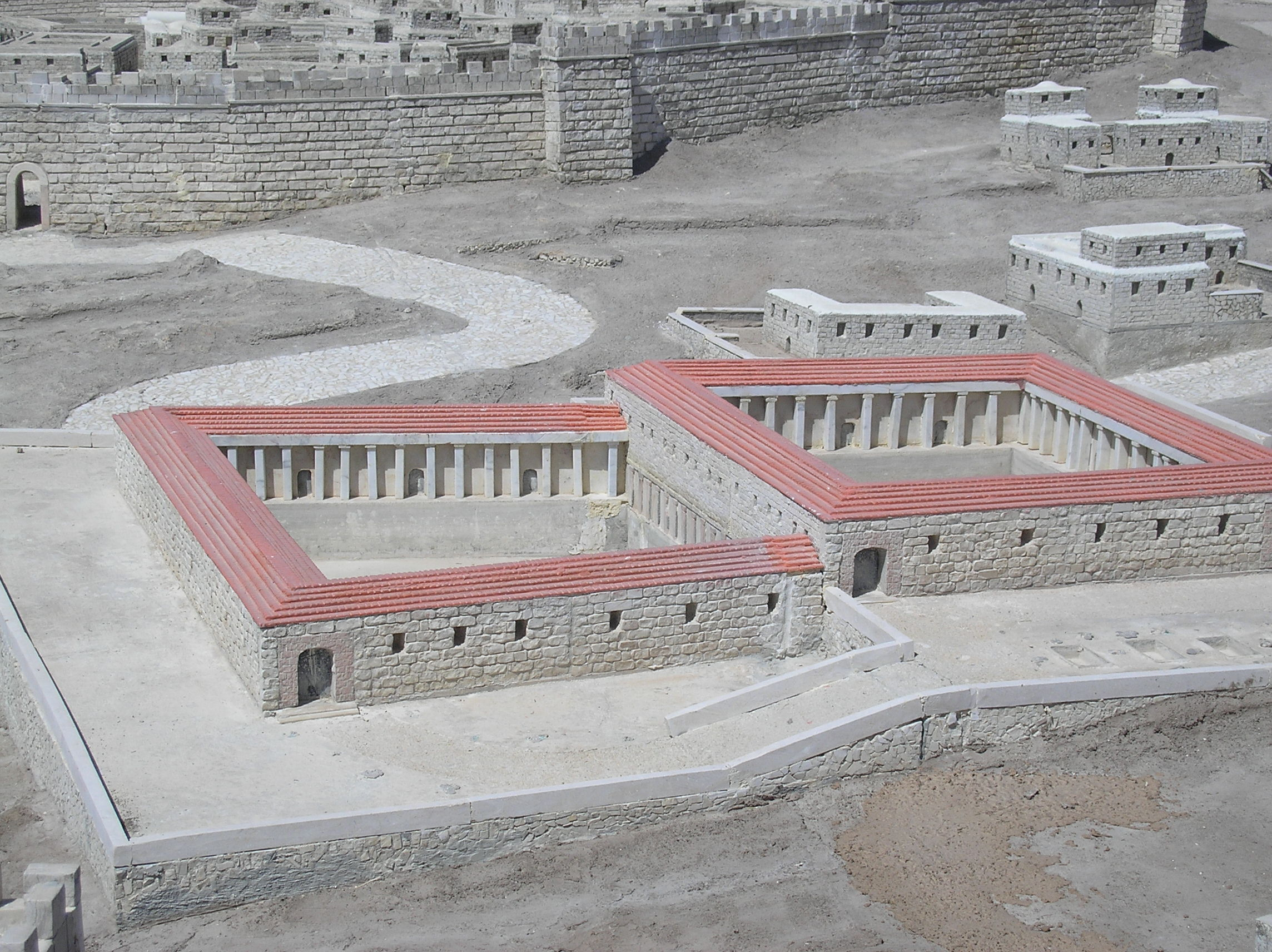
Pool of Bethesda - Model of Jerusalem in the Late 2nd Temple Period, at the Israel Museum.

As Jerusalem grew so did the demand for water, of which the city had inadequate supplies. Water works were therefore built to convey water to a storage pool northwest of the Temple Mount, draining both Beit Zeita stream and the Tyropoeon. The tunnel is 80 meters long, approximately 1.20 feet (0.37 m) wide, and 12 feet (3.7 m) high at its tallest point. The "Hasmonean tunnel" or "Hasmonean viaduct", as it is known, was unearthed during excavations by the Israeli Ministry of Religious Affairs in 1985 and is currently accessible through the Western Wall Tunnel. The exact mining date has not yet been ascertained, and while some date it as early as the First Temple period, it certainly precedes Herod.

Besides rock-hewn and plastered cisterns, a regular feature of many homes, the inhabitants of Jerusalem also made use of public storage pools. These included the Pools of Bethesda, north of the Temple Mount, and Hezekiah's Pool, north of the Tower of David. Pools north of the Temple Mount probably served the Temple as well, their water used for washing the altar and courtyard of blood, as well as for watering the livestock used as sacrifice. It is unclear exactly when the pools were constructed, but they were certainly expanded during the Hasmonean period due to Jerusalem's increased need for water.

The Hasmonean period also witnessed efforts to deliver water to Jerusalem from further afield. It was probably during Alexander Jannæus' reign that the lower aqueduct was hewn, transporting water from the spring of Ein Eitam (near Bethlehem) to the vicinity of the Temple Mount. As Ein Eitam's altitude is only 30 meters higher than that of the mount, this was a significant feat of technology and engineering. The aqueduct had to bypass several ridges to reach its destination and is therefore very twisted, requiring it to maintain a slope of three feet for every mile. To make it shorter, a 400 meters tunnel was carved below the Jabel Mukaber ridge.

=== Rural hinterland ===
To support the rapid growth of the capital and the massive influx of pilgrims, the Hasmonean state heavily developed Jerusalem's surrounding countryside. Spatial analysis (GIS) shows that the number of farming villages and estates within a two-hour walk (10 kilometers or 6.2 miles) of the Temple Mount nearly doubled, growing from 15 to 29 settlements. Many of these new farms were built on previously unused land on the city's outer edges, an organized expansion likely modeled after Hellenistic military settlements (katoikia) where land was given to veterans or elites in exchange for service. This agricultural network was tightly controlled by a government tax system based in the city; roughly 38% of these rural sites have yielded storage jars stamped with the ancient Hebrew letters *yršlm* (Jerusalem) or *yhdt* (Judea), a system started under Simon Maccabeus.

Furthermore, the daily work on these farms was directly tied to the religious needs of the Temple. To meet strict Jewish purity laws, nearly 44% of these farmsteads were built with rock-cut ritual baths (miqva'ot) right next to their wine and olive presses. This unique setup ensured that the wine and oil stayed ritually pure from the very moment the fruit was squeezed in the fields. Some sites, like Har Harat and Sharafat, featured special small crushing stones used to extract the highest-grade olive oil for the Temple's Menorah before the fruit was put under heavy wooden press beams. Additionally, about 27% of these rural estates ran large dove-raising installations (columbaria) to supply the massive daily demand for bird sacrifices brought by visitors to the capital.

== Herodian period (37–4 BCE) ==
Much like other eras in the history of Second Temple period Jerusalem, King Herod's rule was characterized by contrast and contradictions. Like Herod's personality, it was a time of grandeur and excess. The contrast between the pagan city and the holy Temple that stood in its midst, or between the cruel and murderous king versus the entrepreneur who adorned the city in splendor and luxury, have fueled massive interest in the history of the city at one of its most significant points.

=== Political state ===
Herod's reign was mostly peaceful and characterized by economic prosperity and a building boom. The king carried great favor with his Roman patrons, towards which he was very generous, and therefore enjoyed considerable freedom of action to fortify both city and state without alarming Rome. Herod ruled Jerusalem for thirty-three years (37–4 BCE), during which he continuously balanced his loyalty to Rome with his commitment and obligations to his Jewish subjects. The Jews, however, despised Herod and called him an "Edomite slave", a reference both to his foreign origins and to his subservience to Rome. Early in his reign Herod sought to acquire legitimacy for his rule by marrying Mariamne, a Hasmonean princess and sister of Aristobulus III. Mariamne soon fell out of favour with Herod and he had her executed. He then sought legitimacy by his grand reconstruction of the Temple.

=== Social and religious state ===
Herod once again turned Jerusalem into a Hellenistic city, including all the constituent elements and institutions of a Polis. He built a large theatre, instituted wrestling tournaments in honor of the Emperor, staged spectacles where men fought wild animals, and encouraged gentile immigration to Jerusalem. Herod's efforts did not go entirely unappreciated by his subjects:

He who has not seen Jerusalem in its beauty, has not seen a beautiful great city in his whole life; and who has not seen the building of the Second Temple, has not seen a handsome building in his life. What is meant by this? Said Abayi, according to others Rabbi Hisda: It means the building of Herod.

— Babylonian Talmud: Tractate Sukkah chapter 5

Philo, himself a Hellenized Jew, described Jerusalem during festivities:

For innumerable companies of men from a countless variety of cities, some by land and some by sea, from east and from west, from the north and from the south, came to the Temple at every festival

— Philo, The Special Laws I, 69

The pilgrims were economically crucial. They came from all corners of the empire, bringing with them the latest news and innovations, conducting both retail and wholesale trade and providing a living for large segments of the local population. Jerusalem was prosperous and the material wealth and luxury of the affluent and priestly classes were also at their peak. This is testified by archaeological finds such as Mikvaot (ritual baths) in the privacy of priestly homes and the discovery of rare glassware in excavations in the Herodian Quarter, in the current Jewish Quarter. This prosperity trickled down to the lower classes as well, with the masses enjoying the benefits of the increased trade, the incessant exchange of currency and the very peace that allowed the free exchange of goods. The economic welfare and the widespread Jewish hostility towards Herod allowed internecine warfare between the Pharisees and Sadducees to subside.

Indeed, Jewish Jerusalem was united in its hatred of King Herod. Herod was a cruel ruler who employed spies and informants, foreign officials and customs agents. There were boundaries, however, that Herod refrained from crossing: he did not enter the Temple Mount precinct, nor placed foreign idols in the Temple, nor performed pagan sacrifices in the city. Jerusalem was Herod's showcase and he invited powerful individuals from Rome to view its splendor. Jerusalem did indeed make the desired impression and Roman historian Pliny the Elder described her as:

by far the most famous city, not of Judæa only, but of the East

— Pliny the Elder, The Natural History 5.14

In the religious sense, popular preoccupation with the Halakah laws of impurity and defilement is evident. Archaeological findings indicate widespread use of stone vessels, a material that according to Judaism cannot be defiled, in many homes, especially those attributed to the priestly class. Excavations throughout the city have located many Mikvaot, including several large public baths beside the main street leading up to the Temple. These apparently served the pilgrims prior to their ascent to the Temple Mount. The ban on idols and graven images seems to have been closely followed as well, for these are absent in even the most luxurious homes, where only geometrical designs are found.

At this time Jerusalem also saw an influx of gentiles, some of whom desired to convert to Judaism. Philo wrote of the phenomenon:

And that beauty and dignity of the legislation of Moses is honoured not among the Jews only, but also by all other nations, is plain, both from what has been already said and from what I am about to state. In olden time the laws were written in the Chaldaean language, and for a long time they remained in the same condition as at first, not changing their language as long as their beauty had not made them known to other nations; but when, from the daily and uninterrupted respect shown to them by those to whom they had been given, and from their ceaseless observance of their ordinances, other nations also obtained an understanding of them, their reputation spread over all lands; for what was really good, even though it may through envy be overshadowed for a short time, still in time shines again through the intrinsic excellence of its nature.

— Philo, On the Life of Moses II, V. 25

Similar sentiments can also be found in the writings of Strabo, Cassius Dio and other Roman historians.

=== Urban landscape ===
Ninety percent of all archaeological finds in Jerusalem dating from the Second Temple Period are of Herodian origin. This is a testament to both the quantity and quality of Herodian construction as well as to Herod's insistence on prior removal of ancient remains in order to allow construction to take place directly on the bedrock.

The outline of Herodian Jerusalem can be summarized thus: In the east, the city bordered the Kidron Valley, above which was built the huge retaining wall of the Temple Mount compound. The Temple Mount was in fact a huge plaza, in the center of which stood the Temple. The courtyard was surrounded by colonnades on all four sides, with the grand Royal Stoa at its south. At the north-west corner of the compound stood the Antonia Fortress. At the Antonia begun a wall that surrounded the northern parts of the city. At the foot of the western retaining wall of the Temple Mount (the modern Western Wall) lay the main commercial street of the city. At the southern part of the street stood Robinson's Arch which bore a large staircase leading from street level to the Royal Stoa. In the southern wall of the mount stood the Huldah Gates, the main entrance to the sacred compound. To their south extended an area of ritual baths serving the pilgrims ascending the mount, and a street leading down to the City of David and the Pool of Siloam. West of the compound lay the deep channel of the Tyropoeon, and beyond it the Upper City, residence of the priests and the affluent. The latter was connected to the Temple Mount by a bridge built on what is today known as Wilson's Arch. At the southwestern part of the upper city stood King Herod's Palace and to its north, at the present site of the Tower of David, a citadel with three towers, the Hyppicus, the Phasael and the Mariamne. It was at this citadel that the walls of Jerusalem met, one surrounding the city from the south and another approaching from the east and the Temple Mount.

Somewhere in the city, possibly in the upper city or to its north, stood the theatre and other Hellenistic institutions. Remains of any of these structures have yet to be found.

==== Herodian city walls ====
At or about the start of Herod's reign, a second wall was constructed in Jerusalem. This relatively short wall was built to include a new neighborhood which had grown adjacent to the Antonia within the city walls. The "second wall" runs from north from the Antonia, east to the area where the present Damascus Gate stands, and then south along the eastern bank of the Tyropoeon to the Garden Gate (near the point at which the four quarters of the Old City currently meet). This path excludes the Calvary (Golgotha), where the crucifixion of Jesus took place, as this would have taken place outside the city walls. As much is testified by the New Testament:

And he bearing his cross went forth into a place called the place of a skull, which is called in the Hebrew Golgotha ... for the place where Jesus was crucified was nigh to the city.

— Gospel of John 19:17, 19:20

==== Herodian citadels ====
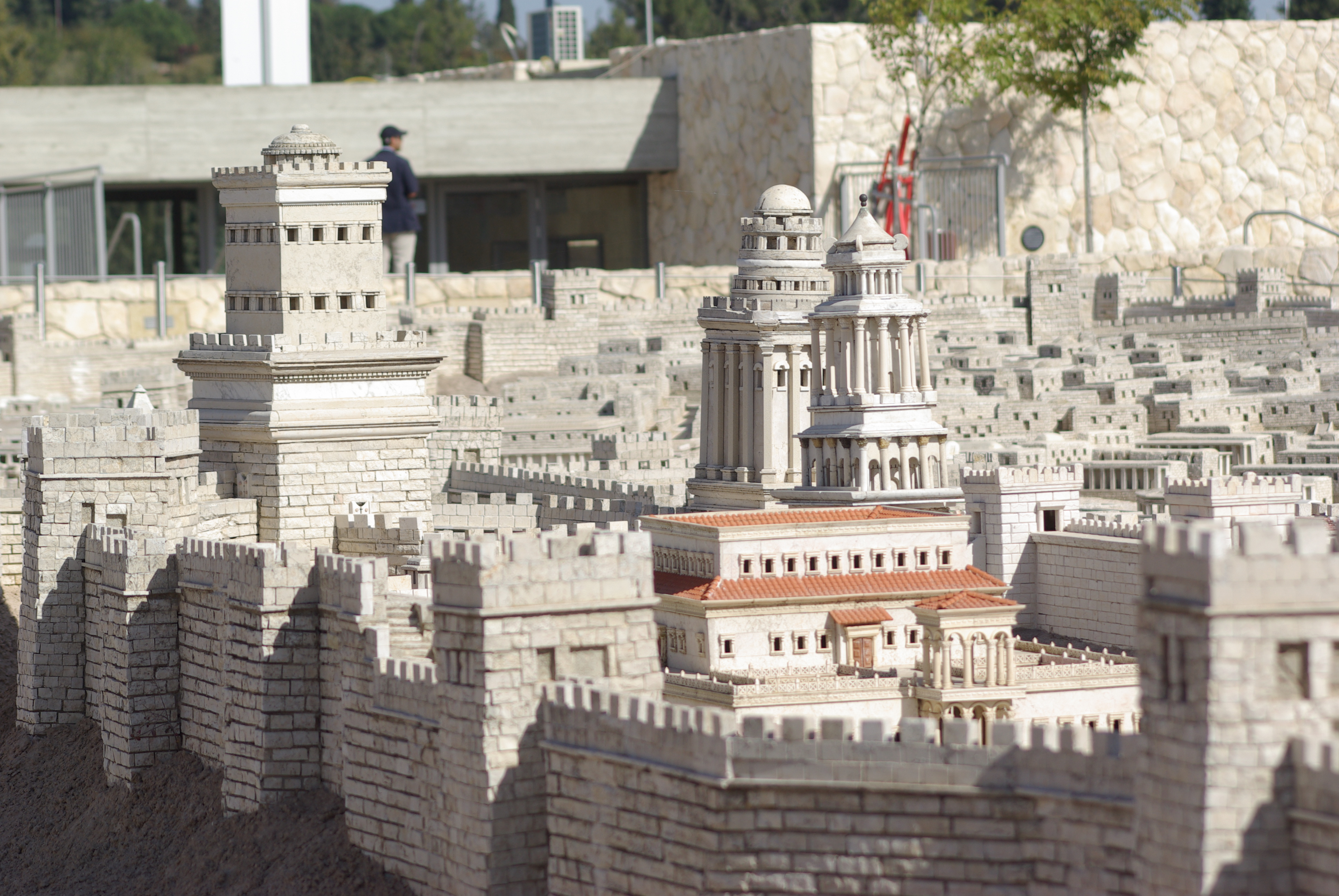
The three towers of the Herodian citadel. From left to right, the Phasael, Hippicus, and Mariamne

- The Antonia was Jerusalem's main fortress, dominating the Temple Mount and housing the city's garrison. It was built by Herod over the Hasmonean Baris before 31 BCE and was named after Mark Antony. It shared the same features as the Hellenistic tetrapyrgion, although rectangular. In each of its corners stood a tower, one of which was taller than the others.
- The Herodian Citadel stood at the present site of the Tower of David. Herod built the citadel, sometimes referred to as the "Towers Citadel", on a hill already fortified in Hasmonean times. Herod built three towers at the site, naming them Hyppicus, Phasael and Mariamne, after his friend, brother and wife. It was at the Hyppicus that the "first wall", approaching from the south, turns east towards the Temple Mount, and also where the "third wall", constructed in the mid-1st century CE, would meet the "first wall".

Josephus provides a detailed description of the towers in the fifth book of his Bellum Judaicum, commenting:

These were for largeness, beauty, and strength beyond all that were in the habitable earth.

— Josephus, The Jewish War V, 156.

All three towers were square. The Hyppicus Tower was 13 meters wide at its base and 40 meters high. Its lower half was solid, above which stood a water reservoir, and above this a two storied palace. The tower was crowned with battlements and turrets. The Phasael Tower was 20 meters wide and also featured a 20 meters high solid base. This was topped by a peristyle surrounded by bulwarks, above which stood another smaller tower containing several rooms and a bathhouse and topped with battlements. Josephus remarked "that this tower wanted nothing that might make it appear to be a royal palace". The third tower, the Mariamne, was similar to the other two in that it had a solid base, and also featured a second decorated story. The base of only one tower survives, identified as either the Hyppicus or the Phasael.

North of the citadel stood the "Towers Pool", another water storage facility which may have been hewn during the Hasmonean period.

- Herod's Palace. South of the Herodian citadel stood the King's palace, "which exceeds all my ability to describe it". Nevertheless, Josephus does provide a detailed description of the grandeur and luxury of Herod's residence: the magnificent halls decorated in gems, silver and gold, the ceilings made of decorated wooden beams, with enough beds to house a hundred guests. It was dotted with open courts and colonnades.

There were, moreover, several groves of trees, and long walks through them, with deep canals, and cisterns, that in several parts were filled with brazen statues, through which the water ran out. There were withal many dove-courts of tame pigeons about the canals.

— Josephus, The Jewish War V, 172.

Josephus laments the destruction of the palace, not at the hands of the Romans which later sacked the city, but by warring parties from within. No remains of the palace have been positively identified, though excavations in the Armenian Quarter, south of the Tower of David, have unearthed a system of massive retaining walls thought to belong to the Herodian structure.

==== Temple Mount ====
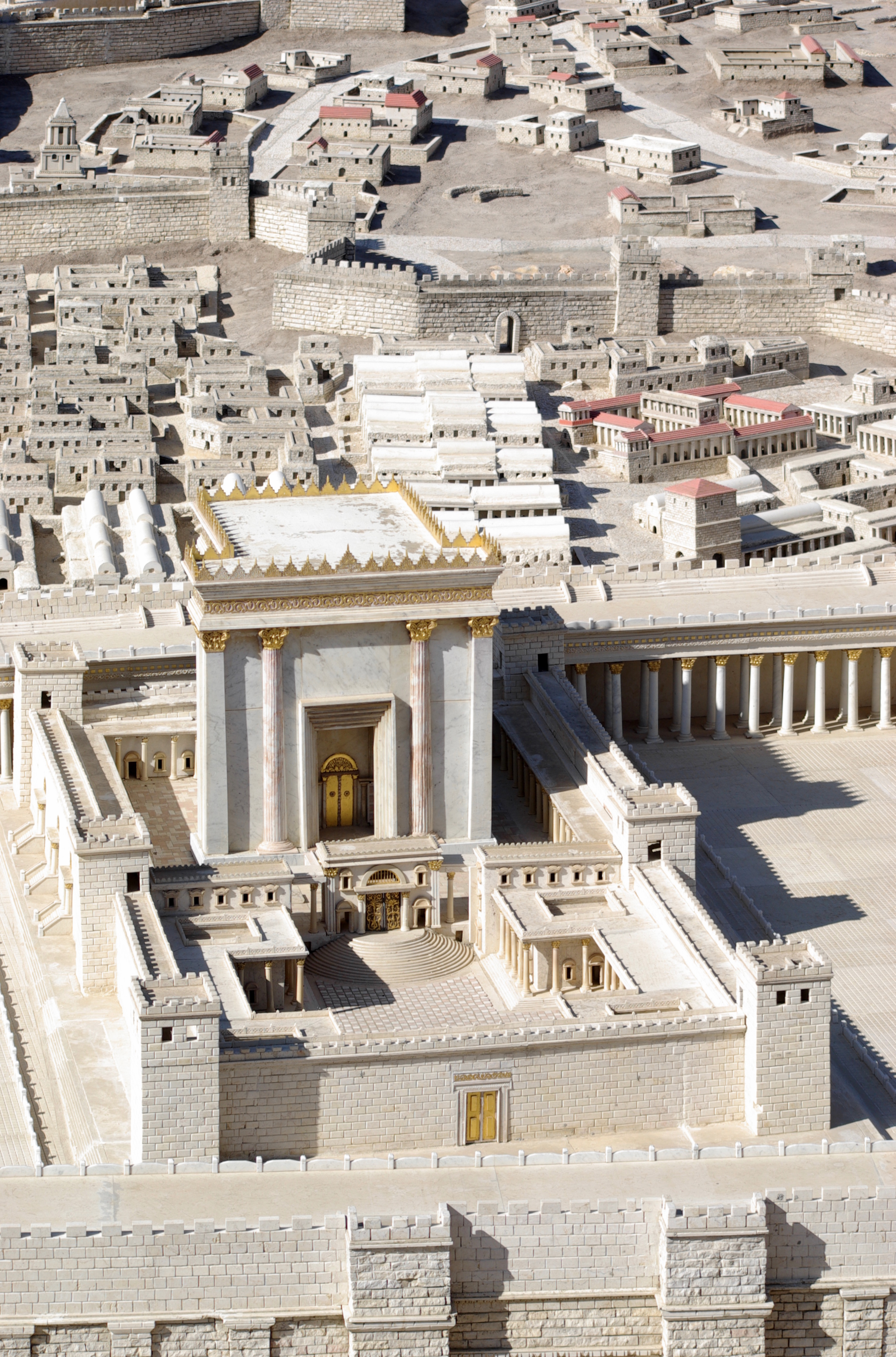
Herod's Temple

The Temple built upon the end of the Babylonian Captivity was a modest one, small and simple. Herod, seeking to ingratiate himself with his subjects and to glorify his own name, massively expanded both the Temple and very mount on which it stood. Under Herod, the area of the Temple Mount doubled in size.

The Temple was the masterpiece of Herod's massive building enterprise, built of white and green marble, and perhaps even blue marble used to portray waves. The building was continuously improved, even after Herod's death and up to its very destruction in 70 CE.

Unlike the earlier structures which stood at the site, there are in fact many archaeological finds, including inscriptions, supporting Josephus' account of Herod's Temple. Herod expanded the Temple courtyard to the south, where he built the Royal Stoa, a basilica used for commercial purposes, similar to other forums of the ancient world.

==== Other structures ====
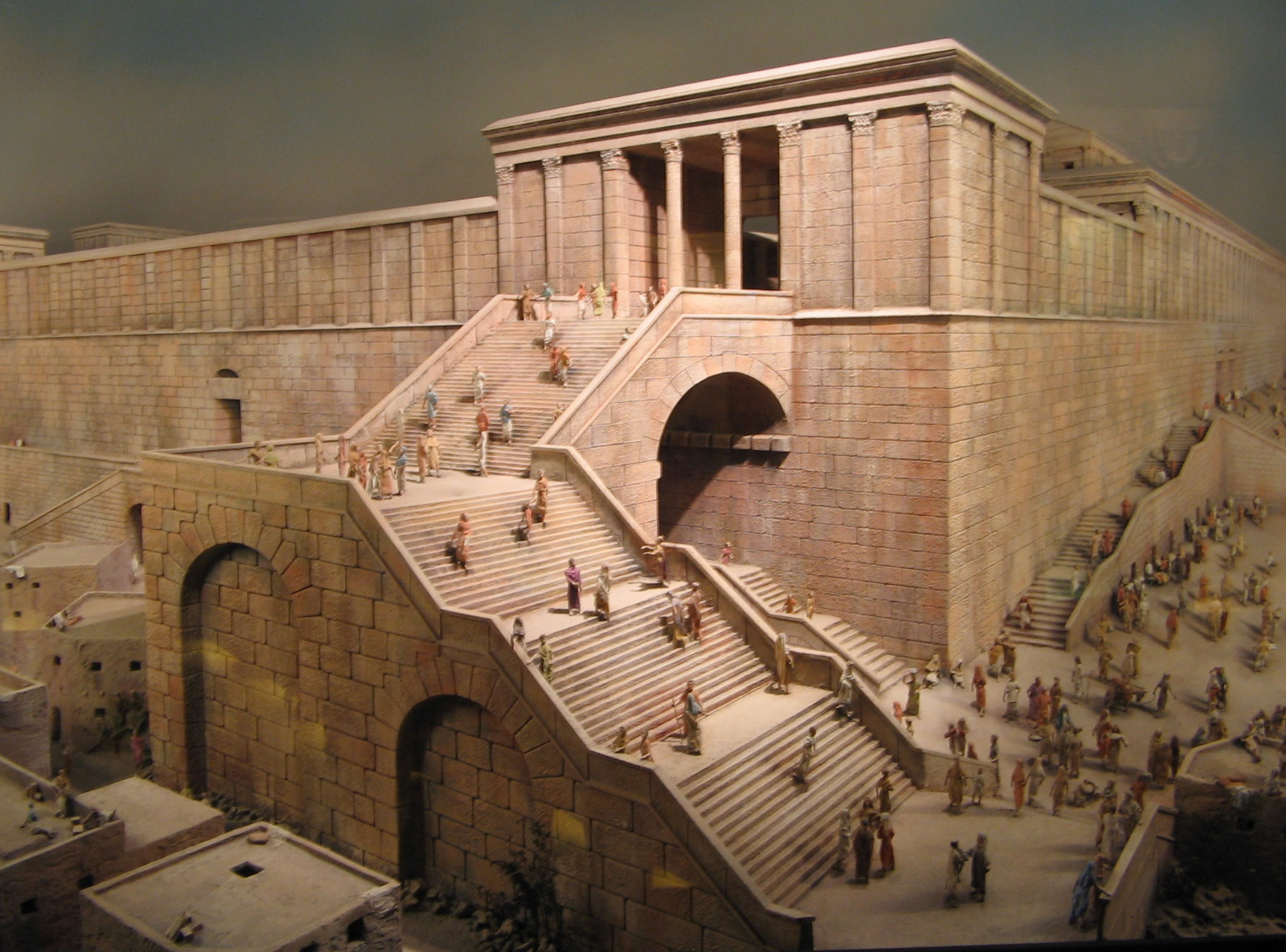
Reconstruction of Robinson's Arch

The Upper City was the name given to neighborhoods constructed on the hill currently referred to as Mount Zion, particularly those parts which reside inside the city's Medieval walls, beneath today's Jewish and Armenian Quarters. It is higher in altitude than the City of David and the Temple Mount. During Herod's reign this was the residence of the priestly class as well as the affluent and overlooked the Temple. It was connected to the Temple compound via a large bridge, the sole remains of which can be seen in Wilson's Arch, next to the Western Wall.

The Herodian street was Jerusalem's main artery, stretching north from the Pool of Siloam, under Robinson's Arch, along the Western Wall, and under Wilson's Arch. Archaeological excavations alongside the Western Wall have revealed that the street terminated at a square near the Antonia, though there are visible remains (such as pre-prepared paving stones) indicating that the street was not yet complete.

The street was built over a drainage system constructed of large and beautifully dressed white stones. From the Pool of Siloam the street climbed up moderate steps that led up to today's Western Wall Plaza. Various shops and stores were situated along its central portion, at the foot of the Temple Mount (along today's Western Wall). Among these were likely shops where sacrificial animals could be bought as well as exchangers allowing pilgrims to exchange currency and provide them with the Half Shekel ritual tax each Jew was annually obliged to pay for Temple maintenance. At the southwestern corner of the Temple Mount stood the street's most important junction. From there it was possible to turn east towards the Huldah Gates, north (up the street), or to ascend Robinson's Arch to the Royal Stoa. Several remains of the street can still be seen in several places: at the Pool of Siloam, in the Western Wall Tunnels, and at the Jerusalem Archaeological Park at the foot of the Temple Mount. The latter features sections of the street buried by the collapse of Robinson Arch's at the time of the Roman sacking of Jerusalem.

Although ancient sources describe Herodian Jerusalem's Hellenistic institutions such as the theatre, any remains of these have yet to be found. These were most likely built on the plane north of the upper city. Michael Avi Yonah placed the theatre in the upper city itself, near the palace of Herod. Archaeologist Yosef Patrich has suggested that the Herodian theatre in Jerusalem was made of wood, as was customary at Rome at the time, which may explain the lack of finds.

==== Herodian water works ====
The aqueduct, a method of conveying water to the city, was an integral part of Roman city planning. Already quite large, Jerusalem needed to satisfy the needs of countless pilgrims annually, requiring much more water than was available. Water was taken from Ein Eitam and Solomon's Pools, about 20 kilometers south of Jerusalem crow flies and about 30 meters higher in altitude than the Temple Mount. Like its Hasmonean predecessor, the Aqueduct took a sinuous route in order to bypass ridges lying in its path, although at two locations it was carved as a tunnel: a 400 meters long section under Bethlehem and a 370 meters section under Jabel Mukaber. At Rachel's Tomb the aqueduct split into two, a lower aqueduct running to the Temple Mount and an upper aqueduct leading to the pool near the Herodian Citadel. Until recently the upper aqueduct was thought to have been constructed 200 years after Herod's reign, the work of Legio X Fretensis which resided in Jerusalem. Recent studies, however, indicate that the Legion only renovated the aqueduct which had been partially destroyed.

== Under direct Roman rule (4 BCE–66 CE) ==
Map of Jerusalem in the first century CE

After Herod's death in 4 BCE and a brief period of rule under Herod Archelaus as a tetrarchy, Judea was made into a Roman province called Iudaea in 6 CE, which was first governed by prefects till 41, then briefly by Agrippa I, and after 44 by procurators.

=== Political state under the prefects ===
The Roman prefects of Judea were equestrians assigned to that position without any connection to the land or concern for its populace. Their rule was subsequently characterized by an increased tax burden, undermining an already delicate political situation. This was further exacerbated after 44 CE with the appointment of Greek procurators who were deemed hostile to Judaism. These are supposed to have given a higher priority to making personal gain over the general well-being of their subjects. Contemporaneous literature describes the period as one of anarchy, agitation and violence, with government activity reduced to mere tax collection. Jewish indignation at Roman rule eventually led to the First Jewish–Roman War. This period nevertheless featured a short period of nominal independence during the reign of King Agrippa I, between 41–44 CE, which in a sense saw the restoration of the Herodian dynasty though there is no indication that the status as Roman province was even temporarily dissolved.

=== Social and religious state ===
Under the Roman prefects the tensions between various Jewish parties, diminished by their joint hatred of Herod, resurfaced as both groups became entrenched in their opposing world views. The Sadducees accepted Roman rule as long as the rituals of the Temple and the status of the priests went undisturbed. These, along with the aristocratic, wealthy and affluent, enjoyed the benefits of Roman rule and its protection. The moderate Pharisees, representing the majority of the population, were resentful of the Jewish loss of independence, yet averse to open rebellion which would arouse the wrath of the Roman authorities, burden the population and likely put it in grave danger. As long as Torah scholarship was allowed to continue and the Sanhedrin to operate, the moderate Pharisees, embodied by Beit Hillel, opposed any rebellion.

As the tax burden increased and Roman contempt towards the sanctity of both Jerusalem and Temple became apparent, so did the strength of a new sect increase. The Zealots, radical Pharisees embodied by Beit Shammai, were dedicated to the restoration of Jewish independence and advocated open rebellion. In time their policies became increasingly extreme, their organization took on military form, and they managed to enlist the sympathies of the younger generation of the Pharisees and even some of the Sadducees.

The Essenes were a monastic cult that had apparently split from the Sadducees and retired from public life. Possibly spurned by the difficult social and political conditions, they set up desert communities where they maintained strict laws of purity and justice. Social anarchy and religious unrest led to a widespread belief in an approaching apocalypse, an "end of days". Other cults and sects sprung up as well, some with their own "prophet" or "messiah". Such were the Fourth Philosophy, a group mentioned by Josephus and related to the Zealots, the Boethusians, an offshoot of the Sadducees, and even Early Christianity. The corrupt Roman prefects and their oppressive conduct contributed to growing resistance and the proliferation of extremist groups, such as the Sicarii, opposed not only to Roman rule but also to Sadducee and Pharisee moderates.

Even at these times, however, there were gentiles who were drawn to Judaism and some even settled in Judea. Best known of these was the royal house of Adiabene, Queen Helena and her son Monobaz II supposedly immigrating to Jerusalem and building palaces in the City of David. Monobaz II would later also render military assistance to the Jews in their revolt against the Romans, sending men to fight alongside the rebels. The "Tombs of the Kings", an archaeological site north of the Old City, has been identified as the burial place of Queen Helena.

=== Urban landscape ===
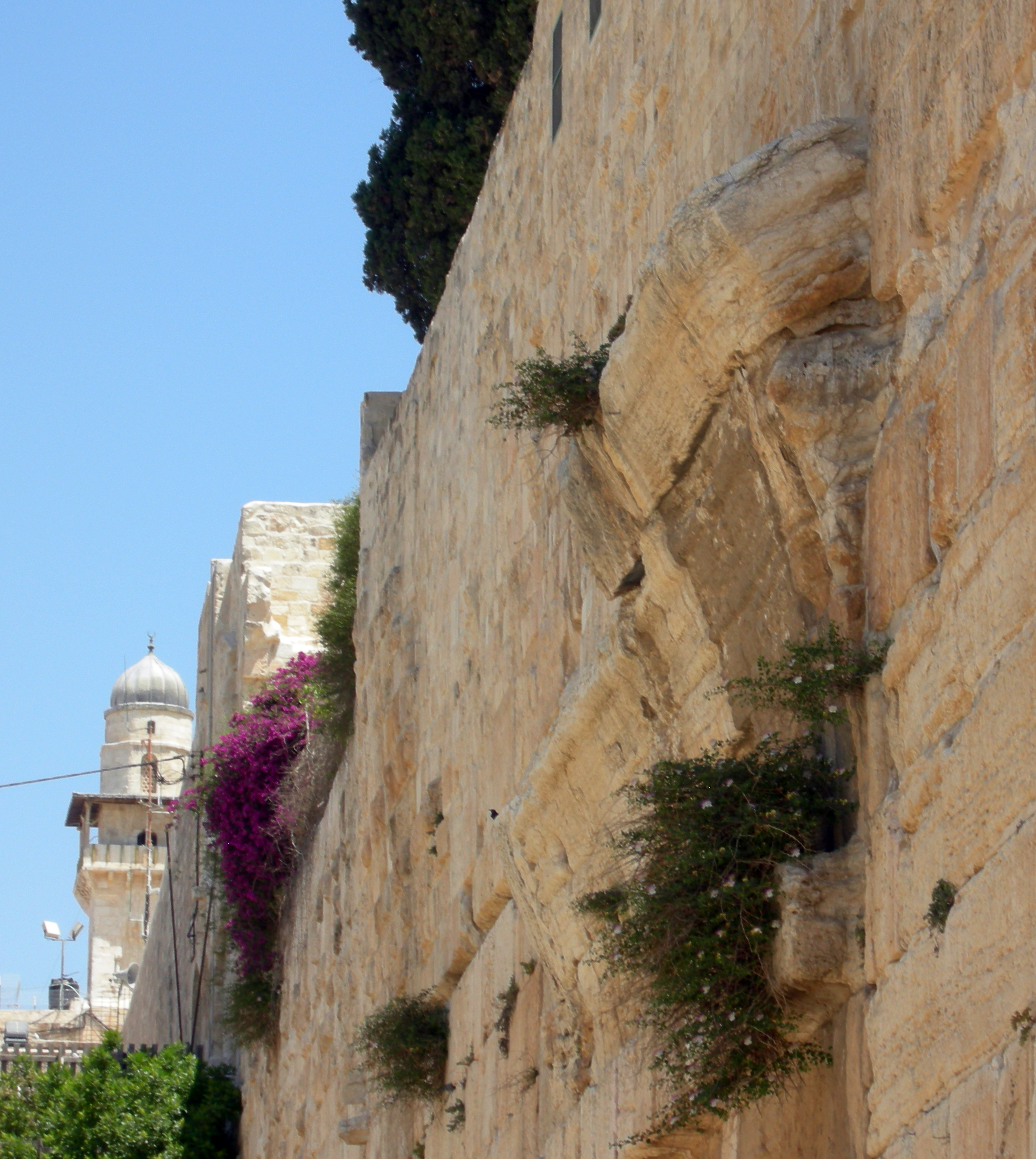
Robinson's Arch

Urban Jerusalem of the early Roman period had two distinct precincts. The first encompassed the regions within the "first wall", the City of David and the Upper City, and was heavily built up, though less so at its wealthy parts. The second, known as the "suburb" or "Bethesda", lay north of the first and was sparsely populated. It contained that section of Jerusalem within the Herodian "second wall" (which was still standing), though it was itself surrounded by the new "third wall" (HaHoma HaShlishit), built by king Agrippa I:

The beginning of the third wall was at the tower Hippicus, whence it reached as far as the north quarter of the city, and the tower Psephinus, and then was so far extended till it came over against the monuments of Helena, which Helena was queen of Adiabene, the daughter of Izates; it then extended further to a great length, and passed by the sepulchral caverns of the kings, and bent again at the tower of the corner, at the monument which is called the "Monument of the Fuller", and joined to the old wall at the valley called the "Valley of Cedron." It was Agrippa who encompassed the parts added to the old city with this wall, which had been all naked before; for as the city grew more populous, it gradually crept beyond its old limits, and those parts of it that stood northward of the Temple, and joined that hill to the city, made it considerably larger, and occasioned that hill, which is in number the fourth, and is called "Bezetha", to be inhabited also.

— Josephus, The Jewish War V, 142.

According to Josephus, Agrippa had intended to construct a wall at least 5 meters thick, virtually impregnable to contemporary siege engines. Agrippa, however, never moved beyond the foundations, out of fear of emperor Claudius "lest he should suspect that so strong a wall was built in order to make some innovation in public affairs." It was only completed later, to a lesser strength and in much haste, when the First Jewish–Roman War broke out and the defences of Jerusalem had to be bolstered. Nine towers adorned the third wall.

Early Roman Jerusalem had a municipal dump located on the western slope of the Kidron Valley, approximately 100 meters southeast of the Temple Mount and outside the city's inhabited area. At 400 meters long, 50 to 70 meters wide, and up to 10 meters thick, it had an estimated volume of about 200,000 m³. The deposits accumulated during the later first century BCE and the first century CE, continuing until the city's destruction in 70 CE. Their contents, primarily potsherds, animal bones, fragments of clay ovens, wall plaster, mosaic tesserae, rubble, shells, and charred plant remains, originated mainly in the city's residential quarters. The lack of comparable refuse accumulation within residential areas and around the Temple Mount suggests that waste was regularly removed from the city, probably through an organized system. Reusable materials such as metal, glass, and building blocks are almost entirely absent, indicating systematic recycling. Cooking pots constituted approximately 31% of the reconstructed pottery vessels, more than three times their proportion in a quantified Upper City household, suggesting that pilgrims purchased inexpensive vessels for use during their stay and discarded them before leaving Jerusalem. Sheep and goats dominated the faunal remains (79%), though sheep were approximately twice as common as goats. They were followed by cattle, poultry, pigeons, and kosher fish; pig remains were entirely absent. Stable-isotope analysis indicates that at least 37% of the sheep and goats originated in desert environments, while only about 10% came from mesic Mediterranean environments.

By the time the first Jewish revolt erupted in 66 CE, Jerusalem had reached its peak in both size and population until the modern era. Covering approximately 450 acres (1,800 dunams)—nearly double the size of the modern Old City—the city was home to tens of thousands of residents; estimates range from 20,000 to around 100,000. Magen Broshi estimated the population at 80,000, while Wolfgang Reinhardt suggested 100,000–120,000. Lower estimates include Hillel Geva's figure of 20,000, Ronny Reich's estimate of 28,600, and Edward Lipiński's range of 35,000–40,000. Other scholars provided estimates of 75,000 (John Strange) and 60,000–70,000 (Lee Levine).

== Revolt, civil war and destruction (66–70 CE) ==
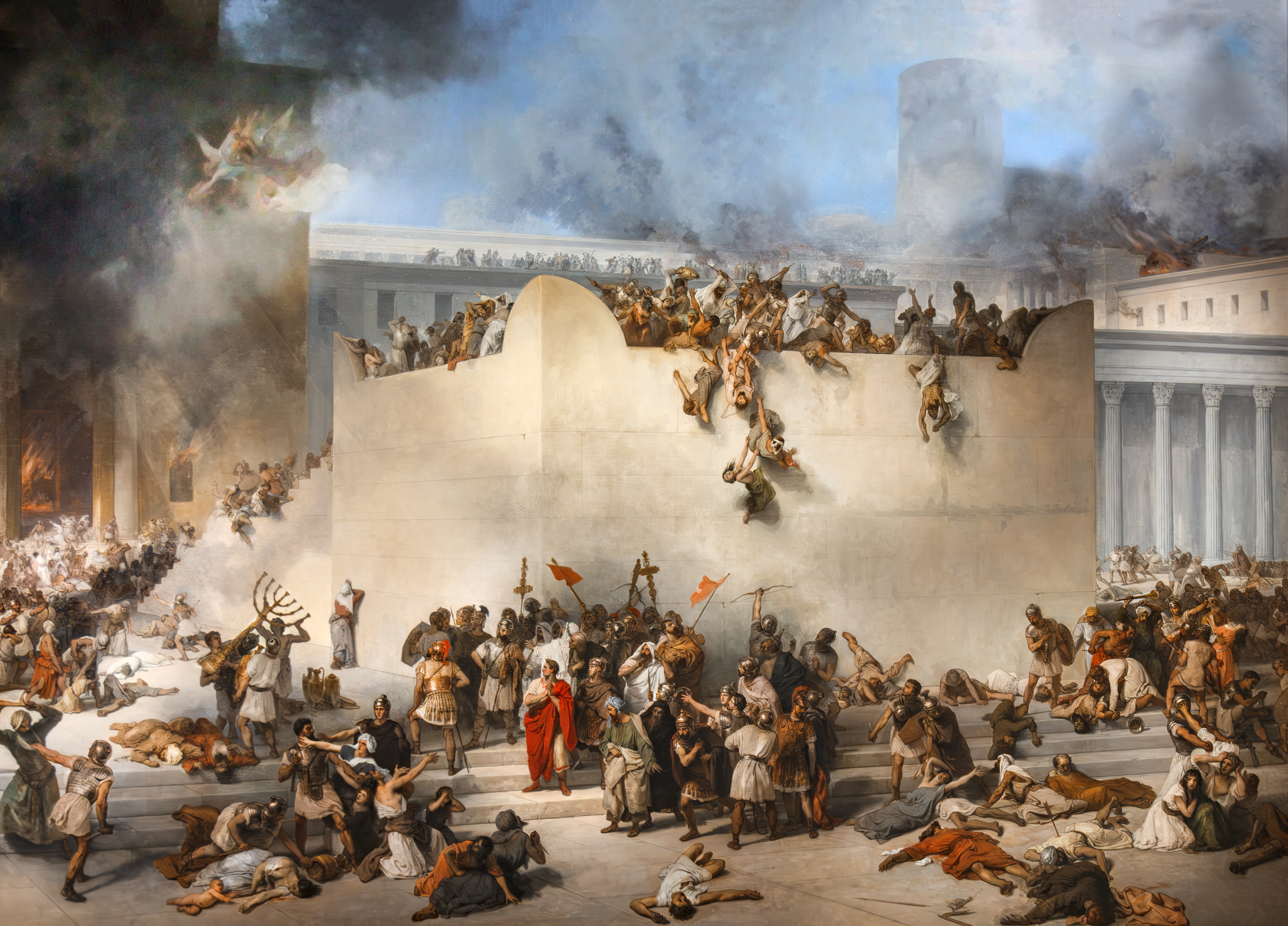
The Destruction of the Temple of Jerusalem by Francesco Hayez depicts the destruction of the Second Temple by Roman soldiers. Oil on canvas, 1867.

In the spring of 66 CE, tensions in Judaea escalated into an open Jewish revolt. Following clashes between Jews and Greeks in Caesarea Maritima, Roman prefect Gessius Florus arrived in Jerusalem and seized 17 talents from the Temple treasury, claiming it was for "governmental purposes," which sparked mass protests in the city. When the Sanhedrin, the Jewish high court, refused to surrender those responsible, Florus ordered his troops to sack the Upper Agora, reportedly killing several thousand people. A subsequent massacre occurred when Roman soldiers charged at civilians. Florus then fled the city, leaving a cohort behind as a garrison. Jewish insurgents soon seized control of key locations, and the Roman garrison was killed.

Roman efforts to suppress the revolt began in the north under the command of Cestius Gallus, the Roman legate of Syria, who advanced toward Jerusalem with an army of approximately 30,000 soldiers. After burning Bezetha, Gallus decided to withdraw to the coast for reasons that remain unclear. During the retreat, his forces were ambushed by rebels at the Pass of Bethoron, suffering heavy losses, including the equivalent of an entire legion.

After Gallus' defeat, a provisional Jewish government was formed in Jerusalem. During a brief period of renewed independence, indications are that Jerusalem enjoyed a sense of hope and prosperity. It minted its own coins and a new year count, beginning with its recent liberation, was initiated. This short-lived independence, however, was soon challenged, as Roman forces, under General Vespasian, began subduing Galilee in 67 CE. As the situation in Jerusalem grew increasingly unstable due to the influx of refugees and rebel factions, the Zealots, led by Eleazar ben Simon, overthrew the moderate leadership in a violent purge. By spring 69 CE, Vespasian had subdued most of Judaea, but political turmoil in Rome following the suicide of Emperor Nero delayed the Roman siege of Jerusalem.

The internal conflict among Jewish factions significantly weakened Jerusalem’s ability to resist. The infighting among warring Jewish factions, led by John of Gischala, Eleazar ben Simon, and Simon bar Giora, resulted in a three-way struggle for control of the city. During this period, the factions destroyed the city's food stores, weakening the population's ability to withstand the siege. Meanwhile, Vespasian left Judaea to assume the imperial throne, and command of the Roman forces passed to his son, Titus.

In the winter of 69/70 CE, Titus arrived in Judaea with an army of at least 48,000 troops. After assembling his forces at Caesarea, he established camp on Mount Scopus just before Passover (April/May 70 CE). Titus then initiated his assault on the overcrowded city, focusing on the northern side, which lacked natural defenses. As famine spread throughout the city, the starving inhabitants fought for scraps, and many perished, with some even resorting to cannibalism. During spring, Roman forces breached the "third wall" and the "second wall" of Jerusalem, and by summer, they had taken control of the Antonia Fortress. Despite continued Zealot resistance, Roman forces overwhelmed the defenders on Tisha B'Av (August 10, 70 CE), setting fire to the temple. Jewish resistance persisted for another month, but by the fall, the upper city had fallen and the entire city was burned to the ground, except for the three towers of the Herodian citadel, which Titus spared as a testament to the city's former glory. Much of the city's population was either killed or enslaved.

== In ancient literature ==
The 2nd-century BCE Greek historian Polybius described the Jews as a nation residing around a temple called Jerusalem. Tacitus, a Roman historian from the first century CE, wrote that "Jerusalem is the capital of the Jews. In it was a temple possessing enormous reaches." In the 70s, the Roman author Pliny the Elder described Jerusalem as "by far the most famous city of the East," highlighting its prominent position in the ancient world.

Jewish sources likewise celebrate the grandeur of the city and its temple. One rabbinic tradition states, "There is no beauty like the beauty of Jerusalem," while another declares, "He who has not seen Jerusalem in its splendor has never seen a beautiful city in his life. He who has not seen the Temple in its full construction has never seen a glorious building in his life."

== See also ==
- Jewish-Roman wars
- Second Temple
- Timeline of the Second Temple period
- History of Jerusalem
  - Cartography of Jerusalem
  - Aelia Capitolina, Roman city rebuilt over ruins of pre-70 Jewish one

Sites

- Burnt House
- Cave of Nicanor, burial cave
- Scopus stone vessels cave
- Stone of Claims, raised platform mentioned in the Talmud
