= Herod's siege of Jerusalem =

Herod I's final campaign to secure his throne

Siege of Jerusalem
- Part of Antony's Parthian War
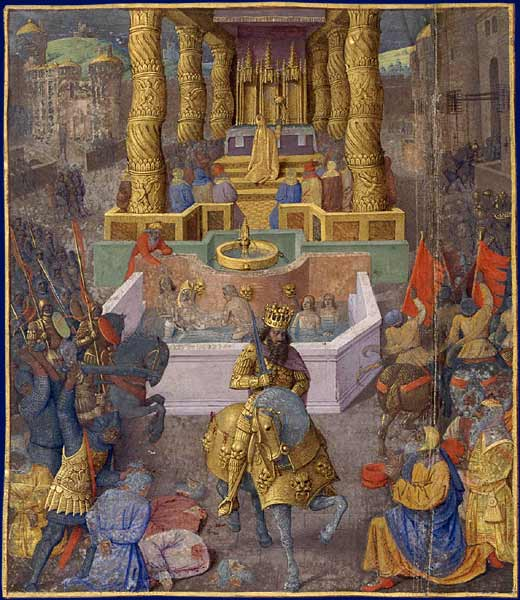
- The taking of Jerusalem by Herod the Great, Jean Fouquet 1470–1475
| Date | 37 or 36 BC (Note: Josephus simultaneously dates the siege and capture to when Agrippa and Gallus were consuls at Rome (37 BC), and to 27 years after Pompey's capture of the city in 63 (36 BC). Emil Schürer (1891) tried to reconcile the two conflicting statements by proposing that Josephus counted the years inclusively, placing the siege in 37, and a majority of scholars have concurred with this view. Filmer, Steinmann and others argued that Josephus's reckoning of dates by Roman consuls is unreliable and conflicts with external evidence, and that 36 should be preferred.) |
| Location | Jerusalem |
| Result | Roman-Herodian victory; End of the Hasmonean Dynasty |

Belligerents
| Herodian dynasty Roman Republic | Hasmonean dynasty |

Commanders and leaders
| Herod; Gaius Sosius | Antigonus II Mattathias |

Strength
| 11 Roman legions 6,000 cavalry Auxiliaries | Unknown |

Casualties and losses
| Minimal | Heavy |

Herod the Great's siege of Jerusalem (37 or 36 BC) was the final step in his campaign to secure the throne of Judea. Aided by Roman forces provided by Marcus Antonius (Mark Antony), Herod was able to capture the city and depose Antigonus II Mattathias, ending Hasmonean rule. The siege appears in the writings of Josephus and Dio Cassius.

== Background ==
In 63 BC, following his victory in the Third Mithridatic War, Pompey the Great intervened in a civil war in the Hasmonean Kingdom between Hyrcanus II and Aristobulus II, conquered Judea and appointed Hyrcanus High Priest. Under Hyrcanus, real power rested with his chief minister, Antipater the Idumaean. In 49 BC Antipater prompted Hyrcanus to side with Julius Caesar during Caesar's Civil War. Following his victory, Caesar bestowed the title of ethnarch on Hyrcanus and epitropos (or Procurator) on Antipater. A few years later, Antipater appointed his sons Phasael and Herod military governors of Jerusalem and the Galilee respectively. After the Roman civil war following the murder of Julius Caesar, Hyrcanus and Antipater became clients of Mark Antony, who now ruled the Roman east.

In 40 BC, Antigonus II Mattathias, son of Hasmonean Aristobulus II, offered money to the Parthian army to help him recapture the Hasmonean realm. The Parthians invaded Roman Syria, took Judea, captured Hyrcanus and Phasael and installed Antigonus II on the Judean throne. Hyrcanus was mutilated, and Phasael committed suicide rather than fall into the hands of Antigonus II. Herod and his family were besieged at Masada, but Herod escaped to Petra. When he received no help from the Nabataeans, Herod made his way to Rome. Supported by Antony, he was proclaimed "King of the Jews" by the Roman Senate and returned to Judea to claim the throne.

Between 39 and 38 BC, the Roman general Publius Ventidius Bassus defeated the Parthian army, sending troops under the command of Poppaedius Silo to await the arrival of Herod. Herod landed at Ptolemais and began his campaign against Antigonus with the conquest of the Galilee, marched down the coast to take Jaffa and then relieved Masada, where his family was still holed up. He then marched on Jerusalem, hoping to capture the city and bring a swift end to the war. Faced with corruption among his Roman officers, mutinous Roman troops and Antigonus' guerrillas, however, Herod was forced to abandon his siege of Jerusalem. He operated in Judea, Samaria and the Galilee instead, fighting against both insurgents and bandits, while sending his brother Joseph to deal with Idumaea. By late 38 BC, reinforced by several Roman legions and having fought two years of counter-insurgency, Herod was finally able to pacify the Galilee and march south towards Jerusalem. Antigonus attempted to face Herod in a pitched battle, striking against both Jericho and Samaria, but both efforts were defeated. Herod once again pitched camp outside Jerusalem, though the onset of winter brought military operations to a halt.

== Siege ==
Jerusalem c. 37 BC, showing the first wall, proposed path of second wall and modern walls (blue)

Herod had pitched his camp north of the Temple, near a saddle allowing access to the city walls, the same location chosen by Pompey 26 years earlier. According to Josephus, Herod had 30,000 men under his command, though a modern estimate puts the number at about half of that. These were reinforced by several Roman legions, 6,000 cavalry and Syrian auxiliaries sent by Antony and led by Gaius Sosius. With the coming of spring, Herod began executing his siege with vigour. His engineers followed Roman practices, erecting a wall of circumvallation and guard towers, cutting down the trees surrounding the city, and employing siege engines and artillery. The besieged suffered from lack of provisions, compounded by a famine brought about by the sabbatical year, but were nevertheless able to put up an effective defense. They sallied from the walls, ambushing the besieging troops and hindering Herod's attempts to raise ramparts, and fought Roman efforts to mine under the walls with counter-mining.

After forty days, Herod's forces breached what Josephus calls "the north wall", apparently Jerusalem's second wall. The first wall fell 15 days later, and soon the outer court of the Temple fell as well, during which its outer porticoes were burnt down, apparently by Antigonus' supporters. While Antigonus shut himself up in citadel known as the Baris, the defenders were left holding the Temple's inner court and Jerusalem's upper city (southwestern quarter of the city). These now appealed to Herod to permit the passage of animals and other offerings into the temple for the sacrifices to continue. During the siege Antigonus had used Herod's lack of pedigree as propaganda, calling him a "commoner and an Idumaean, that is a half-Jew", publicly questioning Herod's right to the throne. Herod, fearful for his legitimacy and popularity, therefore complied with the requests. Further negotiations, however, proved fruitless and Herod's forces assaulted the city. Having taken Jerusalem by storm and despite Herod's pleas for restraint, the troops now acted without mercy, pillaging and killing all in their path, prompting Herod to complain to Mark Antony. Herod also attempted to prevent Roman soldiers from desecrating the temple's inner sanctuary, eventually bribing Sosius and his troops in order that they do not leave him "king of a desert".

== Aftermath ==
Antigonus surrendered to Sosius, and was sent to Antony for the triumphal procession in Rome. Herod, however, fearing that Antigonus would also win backing in Rome, bribed Antony to execute Antigonus. Antony, who recognized that Antigonus would remain a permanent threat to Herod, had the Hasmonean beheaded in Antioch, the first time the Romans had executed a subjugated king. Herod also had 45 leading men of Antigonus' party executed.

With the fall of Jerusalem, Herod's conquest of the kingdom was complete. After consolidating his rule, he began systematically exterminating the Hasmonean line, which he perceived as a direct threat to his reign. Hyrcanus II, the last major scion of the Hasmoneans, was executed in 30 BC. Herod would rule the Herodian kingdom until his death in 4 BC, an ever-faithful client king of Rome.

Herod's siege of Jerusalem may have inspired Psalm of Solomon 17, the earliest text expressing the expectation of a Davidic messiah. The first portion of the psalm condemns the illegitimate Jewish sinners who had usurped the throne in violation of the Davidic covenant, God's promise to establish the Davidic dynasty as the eternal rulers of Israel. These sinners are then overthrown by a foreign ruler and their line extinguished. Scholarship has since identified the sinners with the Hasmonean dynasty, but the foreign ruler has traditionally been identified as Pompey the Great. An alternate reading, noting that Pompey did not in fact kill off the last of the Hasmoneans but rather reinstated their rule, suggests that the events of Psalm 17 describe Herod, his conquest of Jerusalem and the subsequent eradication of the Hasmonean line.
