= Hasmonean Baris =

Ancient Jewish citadel in Jerusalem

Coordinates: 31°46′48″N 35°14′05″E

Jerusalem c. 37 BCE, modern city walls are in blue

The Hasmonean Baris was a citadel constructed north of Jerusalem's Temple Mount in existence during the Hasmonean period.

== History ==
Nehemiah refers to a "birah" on or adjacent to the Temple Mount. This may have been the predecessor or identical to the Hellenistic fortress mentioned in the Letter of Aristeas. It is unclear whether this structure was demolished under the Seleucids or during the Maccabean revolt.

The Baris was rebuilt or repurposed as a fortress-residence under the Hasmoneans during the late 2nd century BCE. Little is known of its form except that it was rectangular and possessed several high towers, one of which was known as "Straton's Tower". The High Priest resided in the Baris, and Josephus reports that Hyrcanus I spent more time in it than at the Hasmonean palace in Jerusalem's upper city. The Baris was connected to the Temple Mount by an underground passageway and also housed the sacred vestments worn by the High Priest. The Baris was besieged by Pompey the Great during his Siege of Jerusalem in 63 BCE, during which one of its towers was felled by Roman siege engines. Under Herod the Great, the Hasmonean Baris underwent renovation or reconstruction, and it was renamed Antonia in honor of his patron Mark Antony.

== Archaeology ==
Some remains north of the Temple Mount have been tentatively identified with the Hasmonean Baris. The current consensus is that this fortress must have been located in the vicinity of the northwest corner of the Temple Mount, as described by Josephus. Because requests to allow archaeological excavation within the current walls of the Temple Mount have been denied by the Wakf which administers the area, current evidence does not allow for pinning down the exact extent and boundaries of the structure.

== See also ==
- Ptolemaic Baris
- Acra (fortress)
- Antonia Fortress
- Tower of David
- Bezetha
