= Holyland Model of Jerusalem =

Scale model reconstruction of ancient Jerusalem

Coordinates: 31.7732°N 35.2023°E

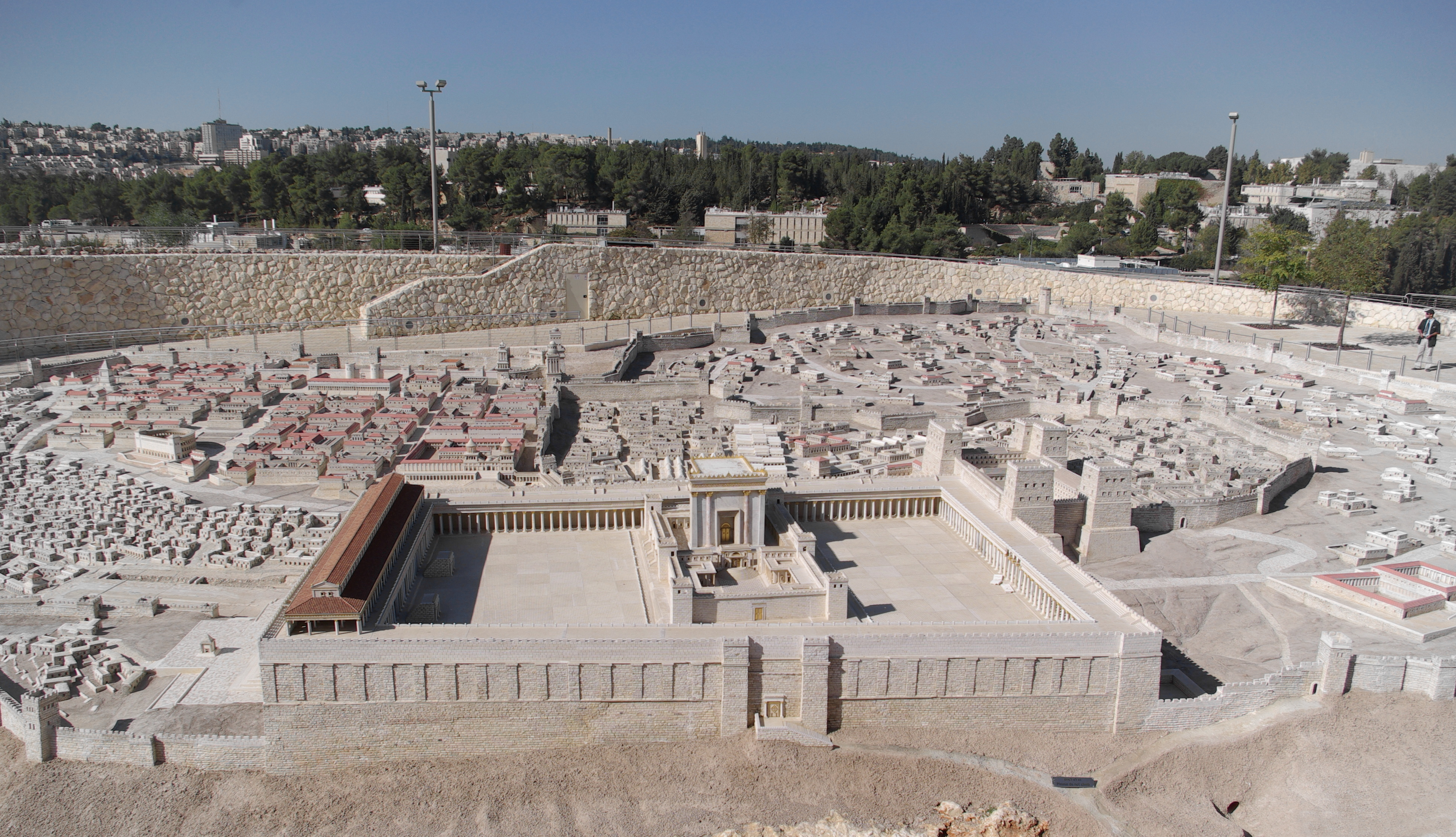
Scale model of Jerusalem, with the Herod's Temple in foreground, during the Second Temple period (c. first century CE), now in Israel Museum.

The Holyland Model of Jerusalem, also known as Model of Jerusalem at the end of the Second Temple period (Hebrew: דגם ירושלים בסוף ימי בית שני) is a 1:50 scale model of the city of Jerusalem in the late Second Temple period. The model, designed by Michael Avi-Yonah, was moved from its original location at the Holyland Hotel in Bayit VeGan, Jerusalem, to a new site at the Israel Museum in June 2006.

== History ==
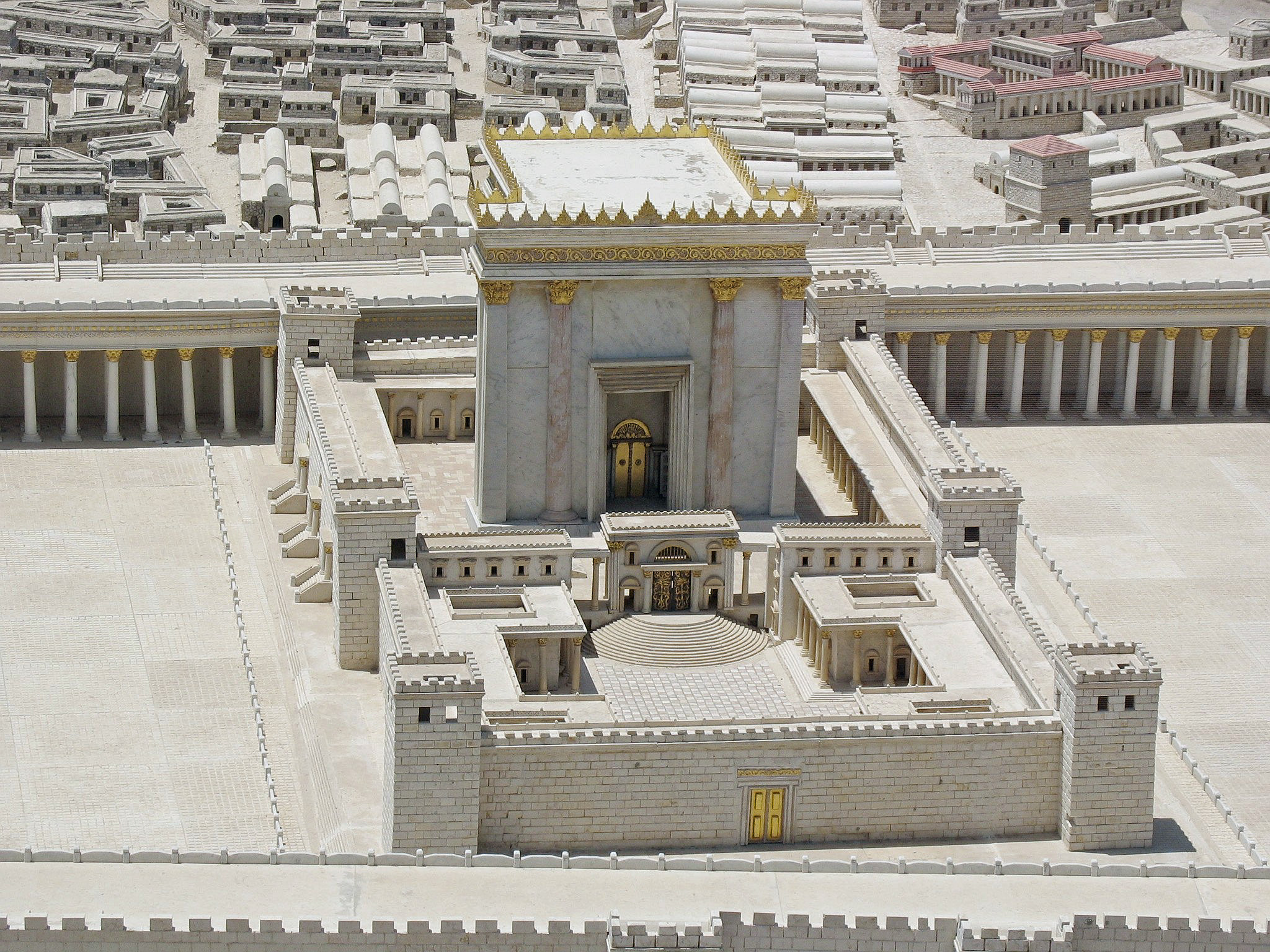
The Model of Herod's Temple at the Holyland Hotel in 1998. Elevated view from the east.

According to Yael Padan, the model was built in 1962–1966, a time when almost the entire area it depicts was under Jordanian rule and therefore off-limits for Israeli archaeologists and visitors alike. This endowed the model with a multi-layered purpose, of replacing the original site, educating the Israeli public, and creating a sense of national belonging and continuity.

According to Annabel J. Wharton, the model, measuring 2,000 square metres (22,000 sq ft), was commissioned in 1966 by the banker Hans Kroch, the owner of the Holyland Hotel, in memory of his son, Yaakov, an IDF soldier who was killed in the 1947–1949 Palestine war. The model was designed by Israeli historian and geographer Michael Avi-Yonah based on the writings of Flavius Josephus and other historical sources. The model includes a replica of the Herodian Temple. From 1974, Yoram Tsafrir (1938–2015) superintended the Holyland Model of Jerusalem.

In 2006, the model was relocated to the southern edge of the Billy Rose Sculpture Garden at the Israel Museum. In preparation for the move, the model was sawn into 100 pieces and later reassembled. The Holyland Hotel spent $3.5 million on the move.

== Notable depictions ==
The Jerusalem model features a number of notable and important structures, as the model was based on the writings of Josephus at the time of its construction. Since then some modifications have been made to the model, such as the removal of the Hippodrome, because the archeological research didn't corroborate its existence which is controversial. To its probable existence point the fact that they organized feasts and celebrations in the city similar in fashion to the Greek ones.

=== Districts ===
The city was divided into districts. On the eastern range, from north to south, stood the Temple complex on the Temple Mount; the Ophel; and the City of David. On the western range, the Upper City covered the highest area to the west and the southern slopes, with the Lower City on the lower southeast slopes. Bezetha was the northern New City.

=== Notable structures ===
Following is a list of notable structures that are or were originally depicted in the Holyland Model of Jerusalem. Some have been archaeologically confirmed, some not.

1. Temple Mount: the model depicts the Temple Mount and the Herodian Temple during the first century CE. The trail offers the view of the Temple Mount from the east.
2. Pool of Bethesda
3. Pool of Siloam
4. Towers next to Herod's royal palace: Mariamne, Phasael and Hippicus Tower. The theory that the still extant stump corresponds to Phasael Tower is contested by Hillel Geva, who identifies it with Hippicus Tower.
5. Herod's Palace
6. The Upper Market
7. Herod's theatre
8. Hippodrome (now removed from the model)
9. Monument of King Alexander Jannaeus
10. Tomb of Huldah
11. Antonia Fortress
12. Tomb of King David
13. Fish Gate: It was located somewhere near (probably east of) the modern Damascus Gate, close to the fish market. It is also believed to have been mentioned in the Book of Nehemiah.
14. Psephinus Tower: It was located on the north-western corner of the Third Wall of Jerusalem.

== See also ==
- Illés Relief (1873), scale model of Jerusalem on display at the Tower of David
- Jerusalem during the Second Temple Period (6th/5th c. BCE-70 CE)
- Replicas of the Jewish Temple (First or Second Temple) - scale models or buildings
- Second Temple, Jerusalem Temple built after Babylonian Exile
