= Bezetha =

Suburb of Jerusalem during the Second Temple period

Bezetha (Hebrew: בית זיתא), also called by Josephus the New City, was a suburb of Jerusalem during the late Second Temple period. It was located north and north-west of the Temple, built opposite the Antonia Fortress (now in proximity to the Convent of the Sisters of Zion and Ecce Homo on Via Dolorosa Street) and extending as far as Herod's Gate westward and beyond. Originally, this part of the city was outside the area enclosed by the second wall, but during the reign of Agrippa I, had been enclosed by the newer third wall. In Josephus' time, the hill on which Bezetha was built could be distinguished by its elevation in relation to the tower of Antonia, which was built beyond the intermediate valley below (partly dug on purpose), between Bezetha and the north side of the Temple Mount. Topographical maps still show the contours in elevation.

American missionary and explorer, James Turner Barclay, in his seminal work The City of the Great King, calls Zedekiah's Cave by the hill on which it is located, "Mount Bezetha". The Holyland Model of Jerusalem depicts Bezetha as one of five major districts of the first century CE Jerusalem.

== History ==
During the outbreak of the First Jewish-Roman War, Cestius Gallus set fire to this part of the city.

Today, the area of Bezetha comprises part of the Muslim Quarter in Jerusalem's Old City.

== See also ==
- Acra (fortress) - a suburb of Jerusalem during the Second Temple period
- Gareb, a hill outside pre-586 BCE Jerusalem mentioned by Jeremiah
- Herod's Gate
- Jewish Quarter (Jerusalem) - a suburb known as the ":Upper City" during the Second Temple period (includes also part of the Muslim Quarter)
- Struthion Pool
