= Ptolemaic Baris =

3rd-century BCE citadel in Jerusalem

Coordinates: 31°46′48″N 35°14′05″E

The Ptolemaic Baris (also Ptolemaic Acra) was a citadel maintained by Ptolemaic Egypt during its rule of Jerusalem in the 3rd century BC. Described by only a few ancient sources, no archaeological remains of the citadel have been found and much about it remains a matter of conjecture.

== Possible Persian origins ==
After the conquest of Babylon by the Persian Empire, Cyrus the Great allowed the exiled part of the Jewish population to return to their native land and rebuild Jerusalem, sacked by Nebuchadnezzar II in 586 BC. While rebuilding the city's fortifications, the Persian administration also constructed a new citadel north of the Temple Mount enclosure, as part of a general Persian effort to bolster the empire's defences. This citadel is the Birah (Hebrew: בירה) referred to in Nehemiah 2:8, 7:2, appearing as the Baris in Greek translations of the Septuagint. The origin of the word is not entirely clear, but may have been borrowed into Hebrew from Assyrian birtu or bistu meaning a citadel or castle within a city, or a fort located at a strategic position outside a city. It may also derive from the Old Persian baru, meaning 'fort'.

Jerusalem was taken by Alexander the Great in 332 BC, in between his siege of Tyre and the conquest of Egypt. Jerusalem, however, was taken without a fight, and no account mentions the Persian citadel at this time. It may have been dismantled in the two centuries since its construction, but may have also fallen into Macedonian hands intact.

== Hellenistic rule ==
In the Wars of the Diadochi following Alexander's death, Coele-Syria initially came under the rule of Antigonus Monophthalmus. In 301 BC Ptolemy I Soter, who four years earlier had crowned himself King of Egypt, exploited events surrounding the Battle of Ipsus to take control of the region. Coele-Syria, however, had been allocated to Ptolemy's former ally Seleucus I Nicator, founder of the Seleucid Empire. Seleucus, who had been aided by Ptolemy during his ascent to power, did not take any military action to reclaim the region. Once both were dead, however, their successors became embroiled in the Syrian Wars.
In 200 BC, during the Fifth Syrian War, Antiochus III defeated the Ptolemaic army at the Battle of Panium, bringing an end to Ptolemaic control of Judea. According to Josephus, the Egyptian garrison still held out at the city's citadel when the Seleucid army arrived at Jerusalem. Aided by the local Jewish population, Antiochus besieged the fort and brought about it capitulation. Grateful for their assistance, Antiochus published a decree granting the Jews religious freedoms. As this decree also mentions the city's citadel, it was apparently still standing after the Seleucid conquest of Jerusalem.

== Letter of Aristeas ==
The most detailed account of the Ptolemaic citadel is to be found in the pseudoepigraphical Letter of Aristeas, an account of the translation into Greek of the Septuagint written at least 300 years after the fact. In one section, the author, supposedly an Alexandrian Jew in the service of Ptolemy II Philadelphus (309 BC – 246 BC), visits the Temple Mount and is then invited to visit the Baris as well:

But in order that we might gain complete information, we ascended to the summit of the neighbouring citadel and looked around us. It is situated in a very lofty spot, and is fortified with many towers, which have been built up to the very top of immense stones, with the object, as we were informed, of guarding the temple precincts, so that if there were an attack, or an insurrection or an onslaught of the enemy, no one would be able to force an entrance within the walls that surround the temple. On the towers of the citadel engines of war were placed and different kinds of machines, and the position was much higher than the circle of walls which I have mentioned. The towers were guarded too by most trusty men who had given the utmost proof of their loyalty to their country. These men were never allowed to leave the citadel, except on feast days and then only in detachments. nor did they permit any stranger to enter it. They were also very careful when any command came from the chief officer to admit any visitors to inspect the place, as our own experience taught us. They were very reluctant to admit us – though we were but two unarmed men – to view the offering of the sacrifices. And they asserted that they were bound by an oath when the trust was committed to them, for they had all sworn and were bound to carry out the oath sacredly to the letter, that though they were five hundred in number they would not permit more than five men to enter at one time. The citadel was the special protection of the temple and its founder had fortified it so strongly that it might efficiently protect it.

The exact location of the citadel is not specified in this account, but the mention of an ascent to the Baris, as well as its location in a "very lofty spot", suggests the author wanted the citadel to overlook the temple enclosure. As the citadel is near the Temple, not on one of the other hills surrounding Jerusalem, the topographical nature of the Temple Mount affords only one such location – a rocky outcrop north of the temple enclosure, a spot where Herod the Great later built the Antonia Fortress. This is the precise location where the Persian citadel is supposed to have stood, suggesting the two may indeed be identical.

It is not entirely clear when the Letter of Aristeas was written, although it is certainly much younger than the time of its supposed creation, in the middle of the 3rd century BC. Opinions differ on the exact date, although current research suggests the middle of the 2nd century BC. Such a date would rule out the Hasmonean Baris or Antonia Fortress as the inspiration for the account, though not the Seleucid Acra. Thus the Letter of Aristeas may or may not preserve a genuine account of the citadel which stood in Jerusalem during Ptolemaic rule.

== Ultimate fate ==
Direct Seleucid control of Jerusalem was short lived, and around 168 BC the Hasmonean Revolt broke out. Although 2 Maccabees contains a reference to a citadel a few years before the revolt, there is not a single mention of a Hellenistic citadel north of the Temple enclosure during or after the revolt. Its sudden disappearance have led some to postulate that the Ptolemaic Baris and Seleucid Acra were in fact one and the same. All accounts of the Seleucid citadel, however, place its construction on the eve of the revolt. Furthermore, it is also believed to have been in the vicinity of the City of David, south of the Temple. The ultimate fate of the Baris is therefore a mystery. It has been suggested that its destruction coincided with the construction of the Seleucid Acra in 168 BC. Once that citadel had been built in a location that would allow it to control and harass the Jewish population of Jerusalem, at the time occupying the City of David, the old and defunct Baris may have been taken apart.

== See also ==
- Tower of David
- Hasmonean Baris
- Antonia Fortress
- Acra (fortress)
