= Letter of Aristeas =

Koine Greek letter about the origins of Hebrew law

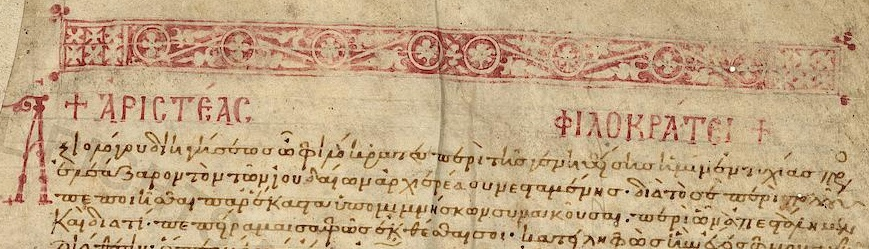
Beginning of the Letter of Aristeas to Philocrates. Biblioteca Apostolica Vaticana, 11th century.

The Letter of Aristeas to Philocrates is a pseudepigraphical Hellenistic Jewish work of the 2nd century BC. The letter is the earliest text to mention the Library of Alexandria.

Josephus, who paraphrases about two-fifths of the letter, ascribes it to Aristeas of Marmora and to have been written to a certain Philocrates. The letter describes the Greek translation of the Hebrew Bible by seventy-two interpreters sent into Egypt from Jerusalem at the request of the librarian of Alexandria, resulting in the Septuagint translation. Some scholars have since argued that it is fictitious.

== History ==
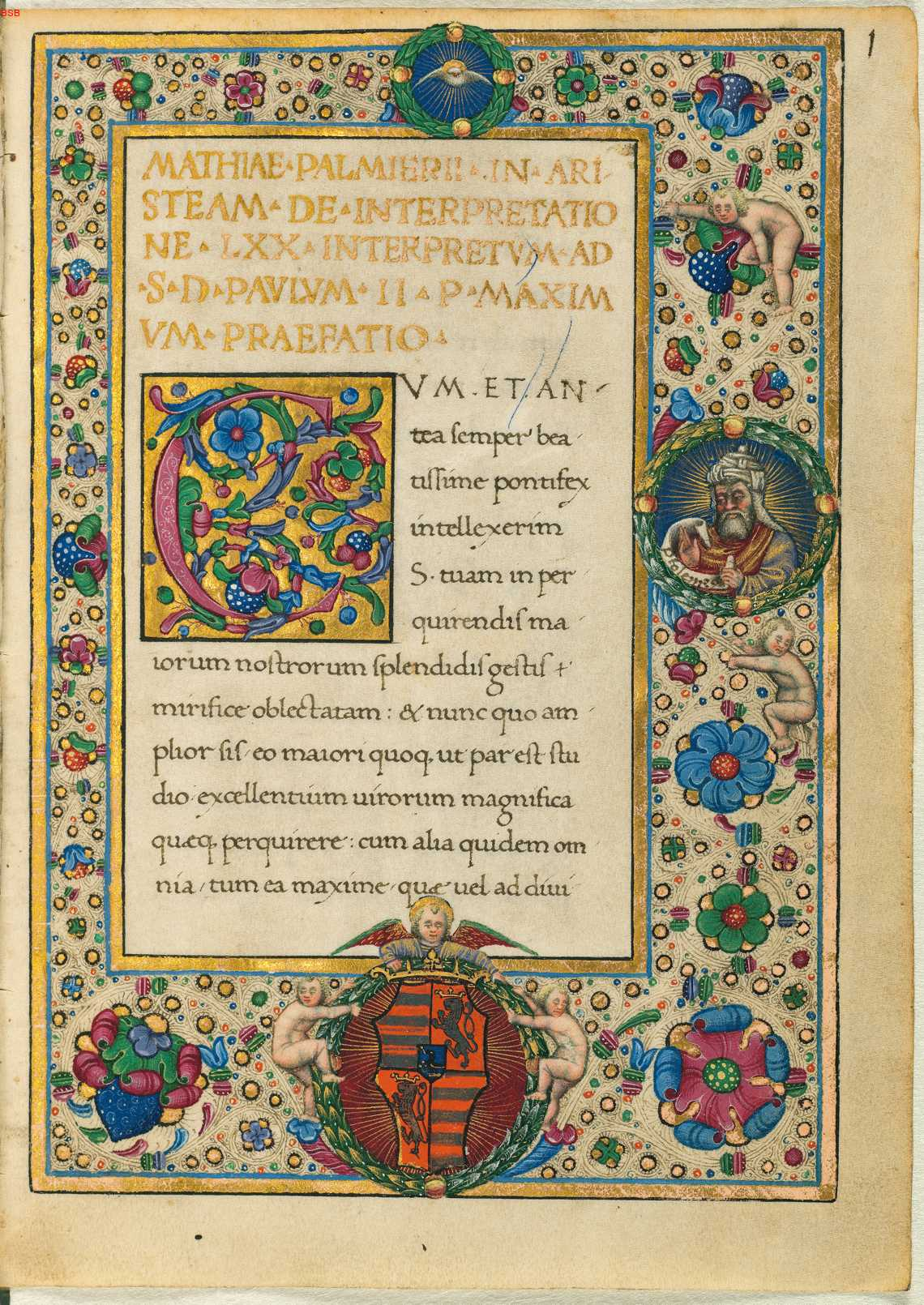
Latin translation, with a portrait of Ptolemy II on the right. Bavarian State Library, circa 1480.

The Letter of Aristeas, called so because it was a letter addressed from Aristeas of Marmora to his brother Philocrates, deals primarily with the reason the Greek translation of the Hebrew Law, also called the Septuagint, was created, as well as the people and processes involved. The letter's author claims to be a courtier of Ptolemy II Philadelphus (reigned 281-246 BC).

Over twenty Greek manuscript copies of the letter are known to survive, dating from the 11th to the 15th century. The letter is also mentioned and quoted in other ancient texts, most notably in Antiquities of the Jews by Josephus (c. 93 AD), in Life of Moses by Philo of Alexandria (c. AD 15), and in an excerpt from Aristobulus of Alexandria (c. 160 BC) preserved in Praeparatio evangelica by Eusebius.

In detail, the work relates how the king of Egypt, presumably Ptolemy II Philadelphus, is urged by his chief librarian Demetrios of Phaleron to have the Hebrew Law translated into Greek, and so add the knowledge of the Hebrews to the vast collection of books the empire had already collected. The king responds favorably, including giving freedom to Jews who had been taken into captivity by his predecessors, and sending lavish gifts (which are described in great detail) to the Temple in Jerusalem along with his envoys. The high priest chooses exactly six men from each of the twelve tribes, giving 72 in all; he gives a long sermon in praise of the Law. When the translators arrive in Alexandria the king weeps for joy and for the next seven days puts philosophical questions to the translators, the wise answers to which are related in full. The 72 translators then complete their task in exactly 72 days. The Jews of Alexandria, on hearing the Law read in Greek, request copies and lay a curse on anyone who would change the translation. The king then rewards the translators lavishly and they return home. Elements of this narrative are re-told in the Babylonian Talmud in Tractate Megillah.

A main goal of the 2nd-century author seems to be to establish the superiority of the Greek Septuagint text over any other version of the Hebrew Bible. The author is noticeably pro-Greek, portraying Zeus as simply another name for the God of Israel, and while criticism is lodged against idolatry and Greek sexual ethics, the argument is phrased in such a way as to attempt to persuade the reader to change, rather than as a hostile attack. The manner in which the author concentrates on describing Judaism, and particularly its temple in Jerusalem could be viewed as an attempt to proselytise.

== Criticism ==
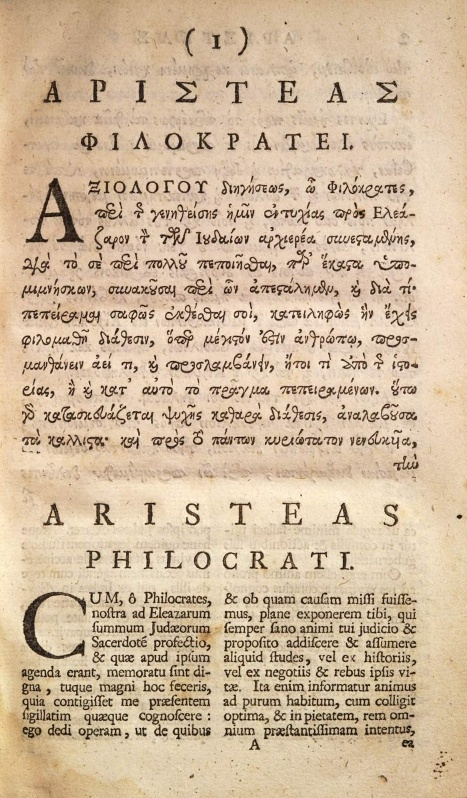
Greek-Latin bilingual Oxford edition of 1692.

Scholars have noted that Demetrios of Phaleron, a client of Ptolemy I Soter, is not a good candidate as a collaborator with Ptolemy II Philadelphus. Roger S. Bagnall notes that Demetrios made a strategic mistake at the beginning of Soter's reign, supporting the ruler's older half-brother, and was punished with internal exile, dying soon afterwards.

The Spanish humanist Luis Vives is sometimes quoted as having been the first to have exposed the fictitious character of the Letter, in his In XXII libros de civitate Dei commentaria (Basel: Frobenius, 1522), on Aug. Book XVIII, 42, but a reading of Vives' Latin text reveals that he only transmitted Jerome's criticisms of the Aristeas story, and added nothing critical of his own account.

The inconsistencies and anachronisms of the author, exposed by many 17th-century scholars were collected and presented by Humphrey Hody (1659–1706), Hody placed the writing closer to 170–130 BC. His Oxford dissertation of 1685 provoked an "angry and scurrilous reply" from Isaac Vossius (1618–1689), who had been librarian to Queen Christina of Sweden, in the appendix to his Observations on Pomponius Mela, 1686, to which Hody conclusively replied in notes to his reprint of 1705. Due to this, the author of the letter of Aristeas is most often referred to as pseudo-Aristeas. Modern scholarship is unanimously with Hody.

Victor Tcherikover summed up the scholarly consensus in 1958:

"Modern scholars commonly regard the "Letter of Aristeas" as a work typical of Jewish apologetics, aiming at self-defense and propaganda, and directed to the Greeks. Here are some instances illustrating this general view. In 1903 Friedlander wrote that the glorification of Judaism in the letter was no more than self-defense, though "the book does not mention the antagonists of Judaism by name, nor does it admit that its intention is to refute direct attacks". Stein sees in the letter "a special kind of defense, which practices diplomatic tactics", and Tramontano also speaks of "an apologetic and propagandist tendency". Vincent characterizes it as "a small unapologetic novel written for the Egyptians" (i.e. the Greeks in Egypt). Pheiffer says: "This fanciful story of the origin of the Septuagint is merely a pretext for defending Judaism against its heathen denigrators, for extolling its nobility and reasonableness, and first striving to convert Greek speaking Gentiles to it". Schürer classes the letter with a special kind of literature, "Jewish propaganda in Pagan disguise", whose works are "directed to the pagan reader, in order to make propaganda for Judaism among the Gentiles". Andrews, too, believes that the role of a Greek was assumed by Aristeas in order "to strengthen the force of the argument and commend it to non-Jewish readers. Even Gutman, who rightly recognizes that the Letter sprang 'from an inner need of the educated Jew,' sees in it 'a strong means for making Jewish propaganda in the Greek world.' ”

But, Tcherikover continues:

"In this article an attempt will be made to prove that the Letter of Aristeas was not written with the aim of self-defense or propaganda, and was addressed not to Greek, but to Jewish readers."

In 1902, I. Abrahams writes:

"It is, to my mind, no longer improbable that the king would communicate in writing with his librarian as Aristeas asserts, though Hody directs his satire against this very point."

In 2001, Bruce Metzger writes:

Most scholars who have analyzed the letter have concluded that the author cannot have been the man he represented himself to be but was a Jew who wrote a fictitious account in order to enhance the importance of the Hebrew Scriptures by suggesting that a pagan king had recognized their significance and therefore arranged for their translation into Greek.

Scholars avid for the scant information about the Library and the Musaeum of Alexandria have depended on pseudo-Aristeas, who "has that least attractive quality in a source: to be trusted only where corroborated by better evidence, and there unneeded," Roger Bagnall concluded.

== See also ==
- Ptolemaic Baris

== Bibliography ==
- Bagnall, Roger S. (December 2002). "Alexandria: Library of Dreams" (PDF). Proceedings of the American Philosophical Society. 146 (4): 348–362. Archived from the original (PDF) on 4 March 2016.
- De Crom, Dries (2008). "The Letter of Aristeas and the Authority of the Septuagint*". Journal for the Study of the Pseudepigrapha. 17 (2). SAGE: 141–160. doi:10.1177/0951820707087066. ISSN 0951-8207.
- De Crom, Dries (10 February 2021). "The Letter of Aristeas". In Salvesen, Alison G.; Law, Timothy Michael (eds.). The Oxford Handbook of the Septuagint. Oxford University Press. pp. 120–134. ISBN 9780191833809.
