= Church of the Condemnation and Imposition of the Cross =

Roman Catholic church in Jerusalem

Coordinates: 31°46′49.26″N 35°14′1.36″E

Church of the Condemnation and Imposition of the Cross קפלת ההרשעה וכפיית הצלב
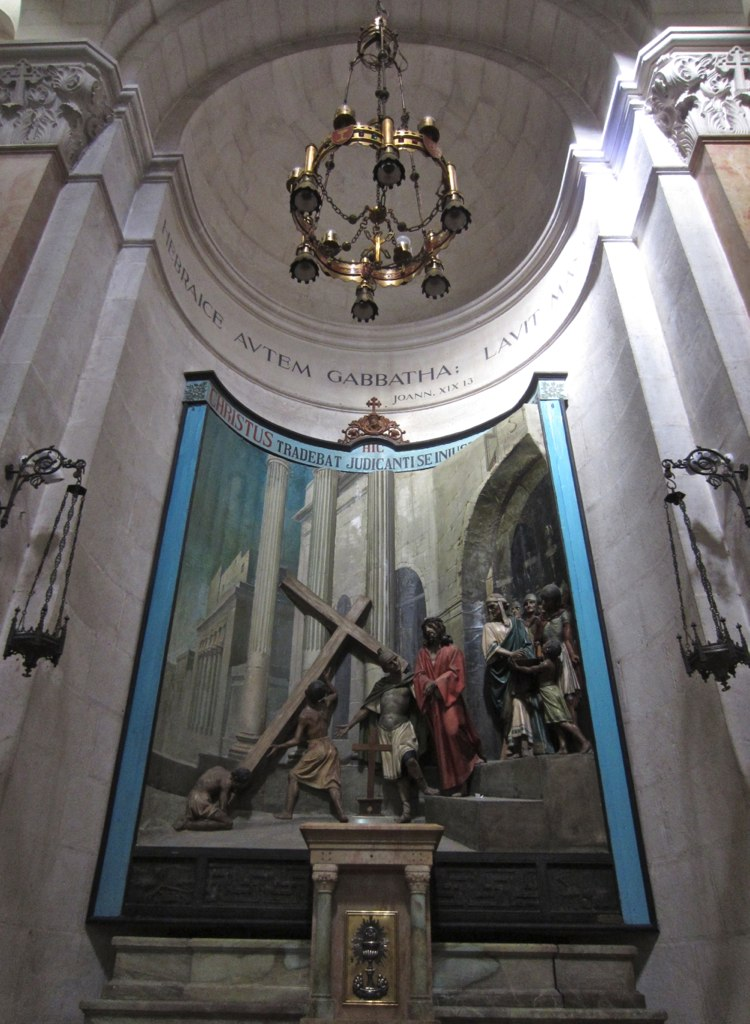
- Interior view: Imposition of the Cross above the altar

Religion
- Affiliation: Roman Catholic
- Leadership: Franciscan Order

Location
- Location: Jerusalem
- Interactive map of Church of the Condemnation and Imposition of the Cross קפלת ההרשעה וכפיית הצלב

Architecture
- Style: Byzantine
- Completed: 1904

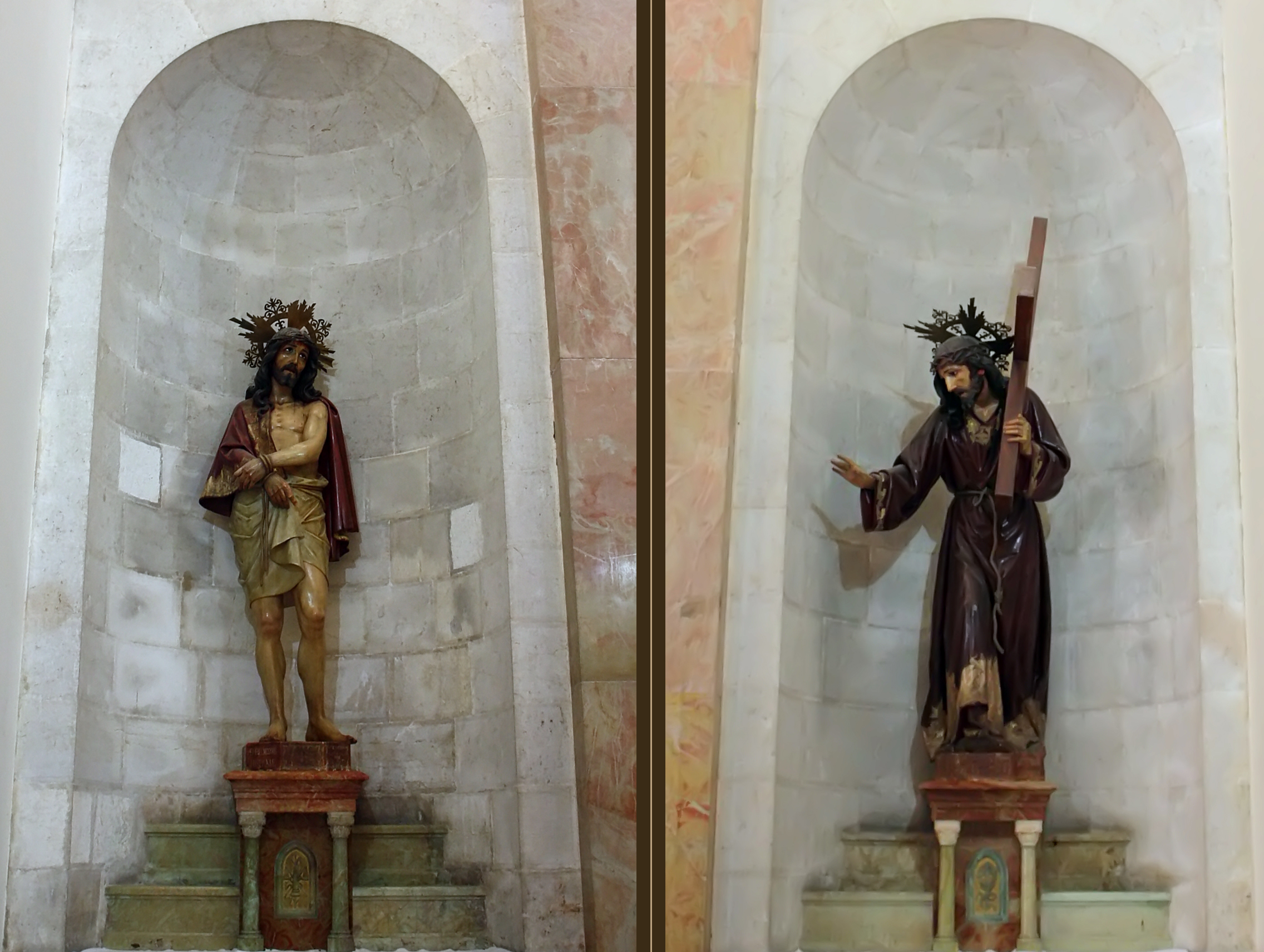
Sculptures depicting Jesus' condemnation & the Imposition of the Cross.

The Church of the Condemnation and Imposition of the Cross (Hebrew: קפלת ההרשעה וכפיית הצלב) is a Roman Catholic church located within the Franciscan monastery that also contains the Church of the Flagellation in the old city of Jerusalem. The monastery stands at the traditional Second Station of the Cross on the Via Dolorosa.

== Tradition vs research ==
The church marks the spot traditionally held to be where Jesus took up his cross after being sentenced to death by crucifixion. This tradition is based on the assumption that an area of Roman flagstones, discovered beneath the building and beneath the adjacent Convent of the Sisters of Zion, are those of Gabbatha, the pavement which the Bible describes as the location of Pontius Pilate's judgment of Jesus. Archaeological investigation now indicates that these slabs are the paving of the eastern of two second-century forums built by Hadrian as part of the Aelia Capitolina. The site of the forum had previously been a large open-air pool, the Strouthion Pool, which was constructed by the Hasmoneans, and mentioned by Josephus as being adjacent to the fortress in the first century. It is still present beneath Hadrian's flagstones.

Like Philo, Josephus testifies that the Roman governors stayed in Herod's palace while they were in Jerusalem, carried out their judgements on the pavement immediately outside it, and had those found guilty flogged there; Josephus indicates that Herod's palace is on the western hill, and it has recently (2001) been rediscovered under a corner of the Jaffa Gate citadel. Archaeologists now, therefore, conclude that, in the first century, the Roman governors judged at the western hill, rather than the area around the Church of the Condemnation, on the diametrically opposite side of the city.

== History ==
The original church was built during the Byzantine era. It was converted into a mosque before being restored to a Catholic church in 1904.

== Design ==
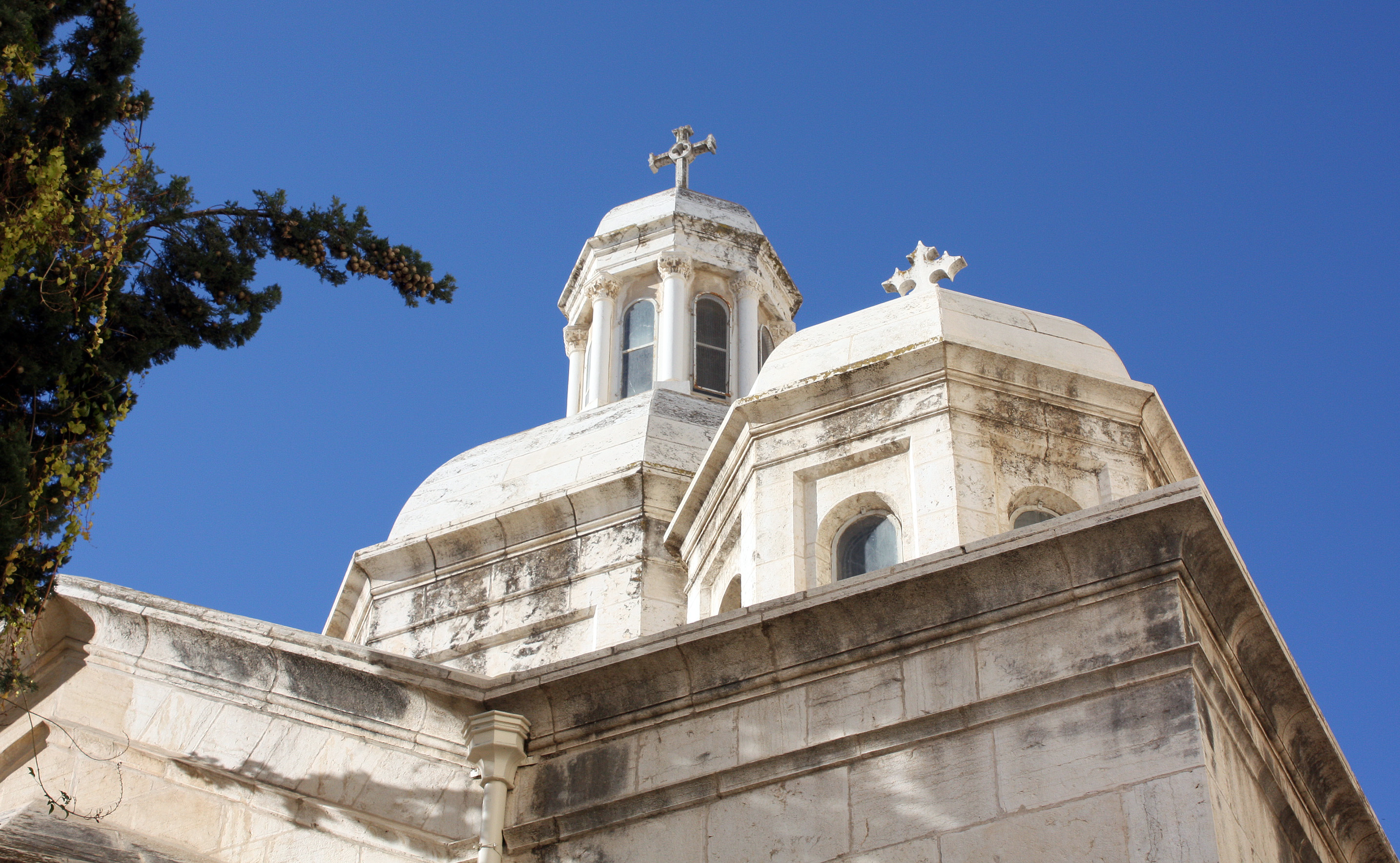
Exterior dome view of the church

The church is topped by five white domes, each of them sitting on a drum containing stained-glass windows depicting themes from Christ's Passion. Papier-mâché figures in the apse also visually narrate stories of the Passion. In one Pontius Pilate condemns Jesus to crucifixion. Another shows John desperately trying to keep the Virgin Mary from seeing Jesus carrying the cross down the Via Dolorosa. Wall illustrations depict Pontius Pilate washing his hands, and soldiers imposing the cross on Jesus. Four pink marble pillars support the ceiling. Pilasters are found on many of the walls, and miniature Corinthian columns appear to be holding up the altar.

An interesting feature of this church is the Roman period floor found next to its western wall. Typical of floors of that era, it is made of very large, striated stones that kept animals' hooves from slipping.
