= Chapel of Simon of Cyrene =

Place of worship in the Palestinian territories

Coordinates: 31°46′46.3″N 35°13′56.7″E

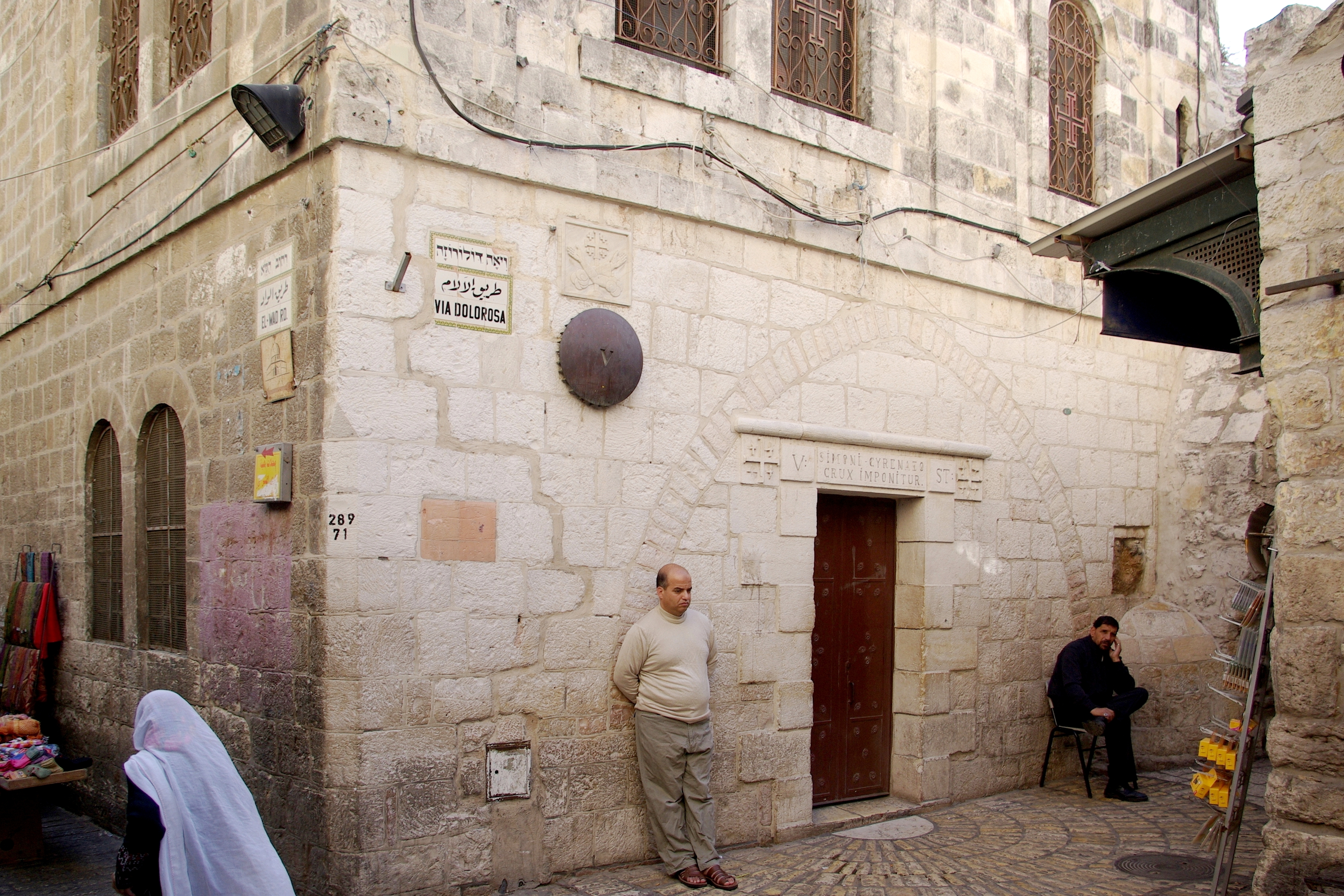
The exterior of the Chapel of Simon of Cyrene, at the fifth station of the Via Dolorosa, in the Old City of Jerusalem

The Chapel of Simon of Cyrene is a Catholic chapel belonging to the Franciscans in the Old City of Jerusalem.

The place marks the fifth station of Via Dolorosa, and refers to the biblical episode in which Simon of Cyrene takes Jesus' cross, and carries it for him. Although this narrative is included in the three Synoptic Gospels, the Gospel of John does not mention Simon of Cyrene but instead emphasizes the portion of the journey during which Jesus carried the cross himself. The current traditional site for the station is located at the east end of the western fraction of the Via Dolorosa, adjacent to the Chapel of Simon of Cyrene, a Franciscan construction built in 1895. An inscription, in the architrave of the main entrance from the Via Dolorosa, bears the inscription "[line 1] Simoni - Cyrenaeo [line 2] Crux Imponitur" references the Synoptic events.

Prior to the 15th century, this location was instead considered to be the House of the Poor Man, and honoured as the fifth station for that reason; the name refers to the Lukan tale of Lazarus and Dives, this Lazarus being a beggar, and Dives being the Latin word for [one who is] Rich. Adjacent to the alleged House of the Poor Man is an arch over the road; the house on the arch was thought to be the corresponding House of the Rich Man. The houses in question are believed to date to the Middle Ages.

== See also ==
- Simon of Cyrene
- Via Dolorosa
