= Umariya Elementary School =

Elementary school in Jerusalem

Coordinates: 31.780325°N 35.234206°E

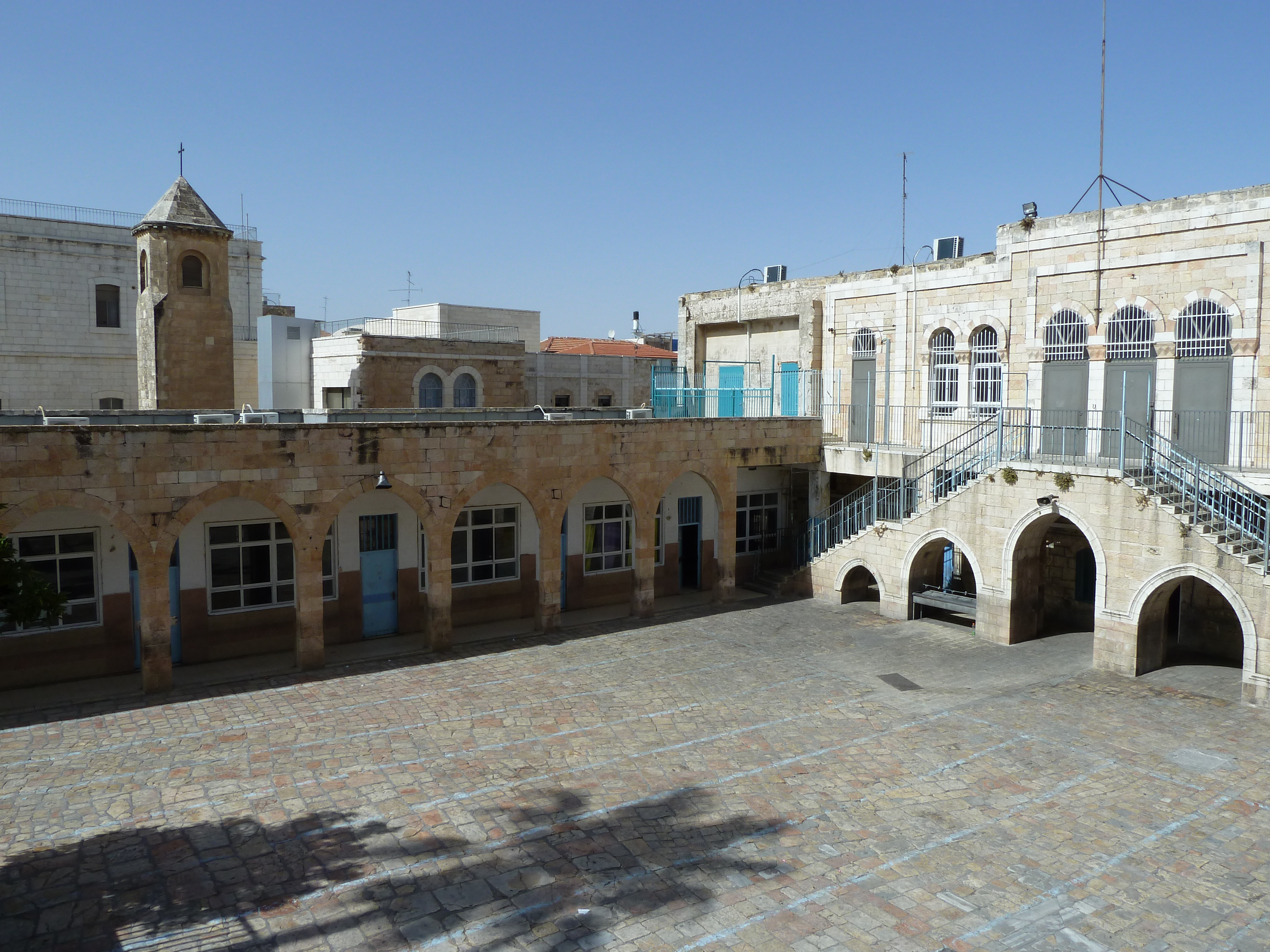
Courtyard of the school

The Umariya Elementary School (al-Omariyya, al-ʿUmariyya) is a madrassa in the Muslim Quarter of Jerusalem's Old City. It is located at the start of the Via Dolorosa, where it marks the First Station of the Cross, and is adjacent to the Convent of the Sisters of Zion. Underneath the buildings of the school are remains of the Antonia Fortress.

In 1996, under the orders of the then prime minister, Benjamin Netanyahu, an exit from the Western Wall Tunnel was opened into the Via Dolorosa underneath the school's entrance stairs. This was interpreted by some in the Arab population as a land-grab, and over the subsequent week, 80 people were killed as a result of riots against the creation of the exit.

== Environs ==
To its south is the part of the northern wall of the al-Aqsa Compound that includes al-Muḥdathiyya (al-Maḥdithiyya), al-Jawiliyya and aṣ-Ṣabībiyya (aṣ-Ṣubaybiyya) Madrasas.

To its southeast is the part of the wall with the Gate of the Bani Ghānim.

== See also ==
- Struthion Pool
