= Church of the Flagellation =

Roman Catholic church in Jerusalem

Coordinates: 31°46′49.93″N 35°14′03.72″E

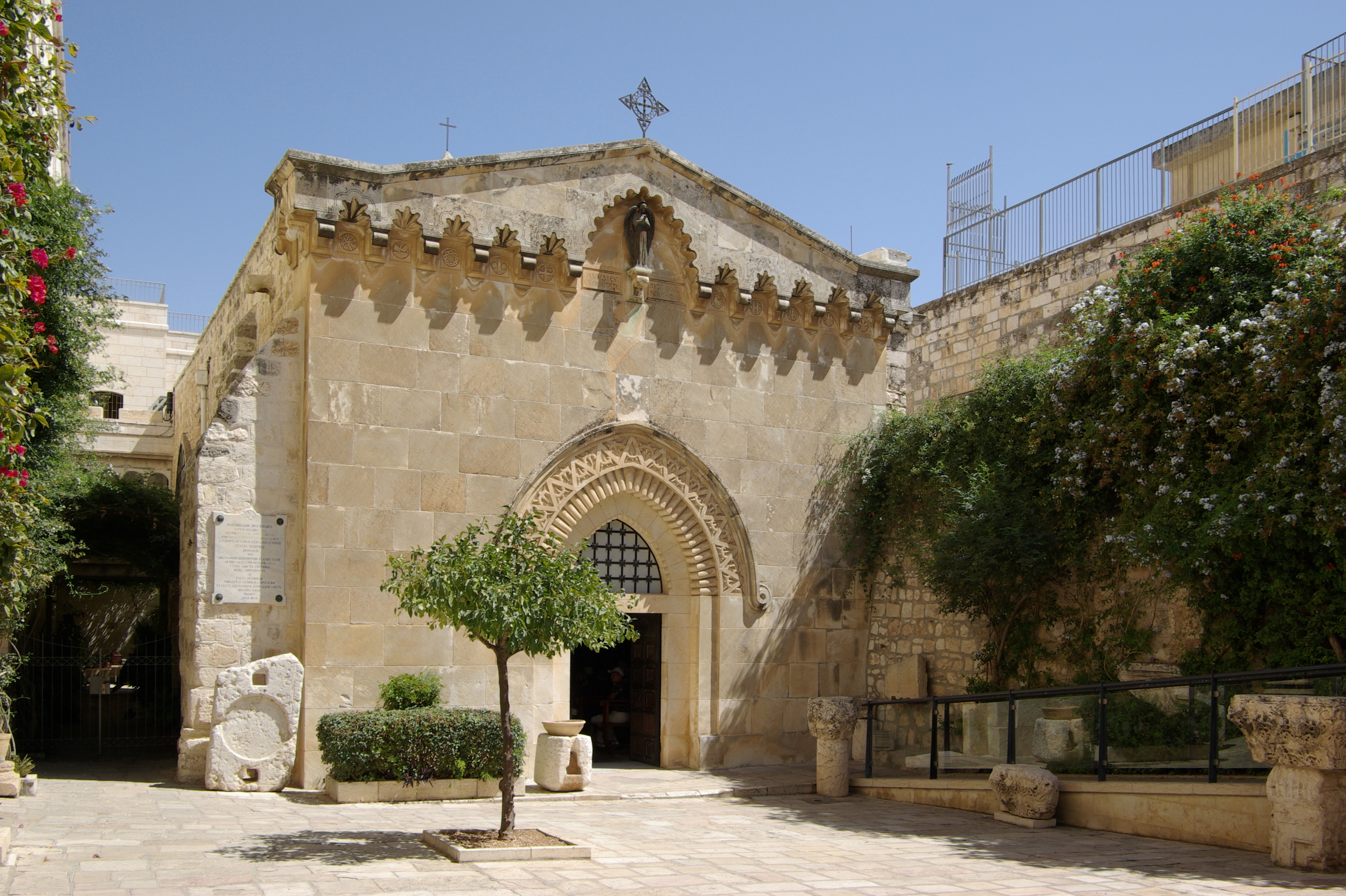

Religion
- Affiliation: Roman Catholic

Location
- Location: Jerusalem
- Interactive map of Church of the Flagellation

Architecture
- Architect: Antonio Barluzzi
- Completed: 1929

The Church of the Flagellation is a Roman Catholic church and Christian pilgrimage site located in the Muslim Quarter of the Old City of Jerusalem, near St. Stephen's Gate (also called Lions' Gate). It is part a Franciscan monastery which also includes the Church of the Condemnation and Imposition of the Cross. The monastery stands at the traditional Second Station of the Cross on the Via Dolorosa.

== Tradition ==
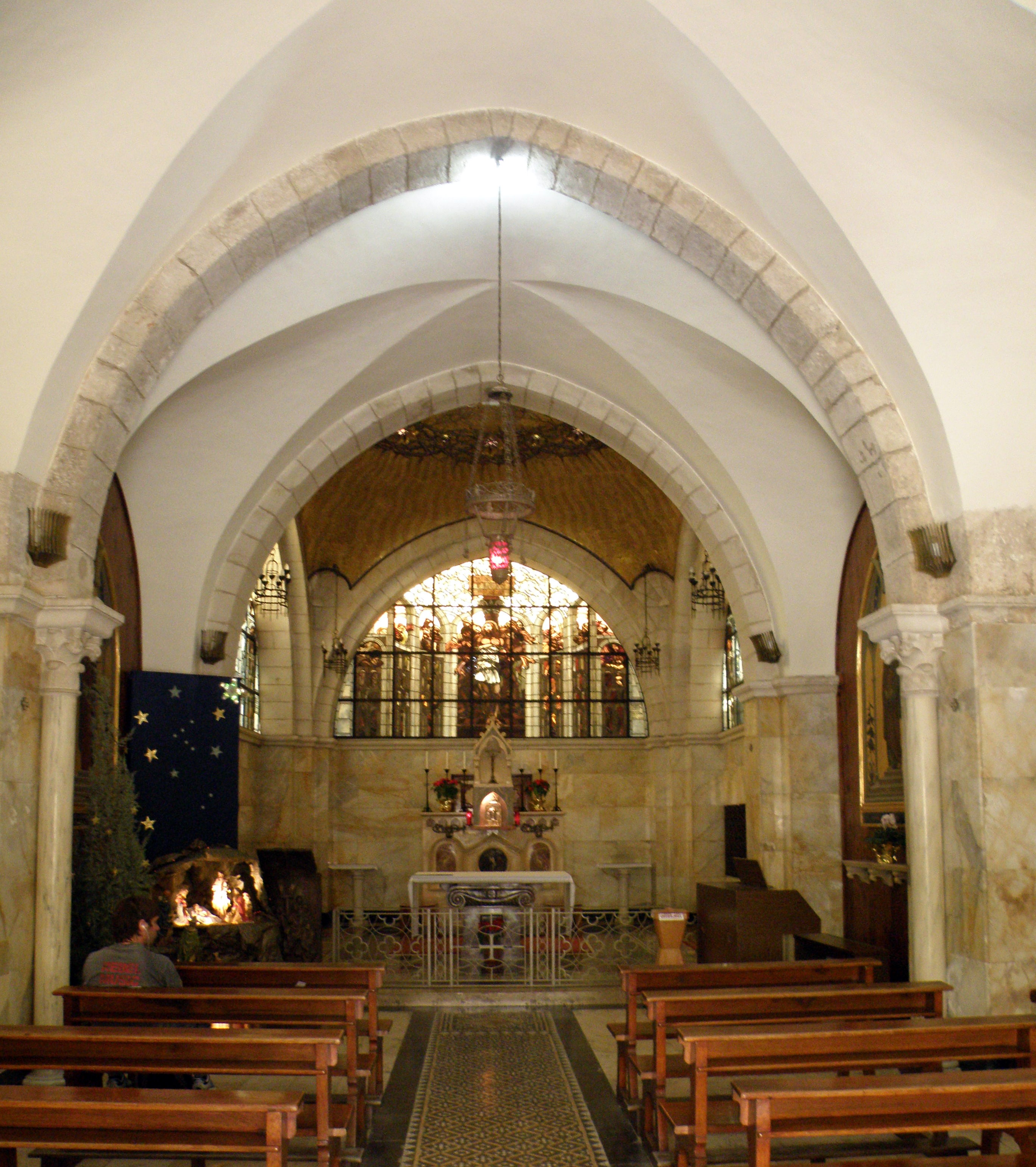
Church of the Flagellation

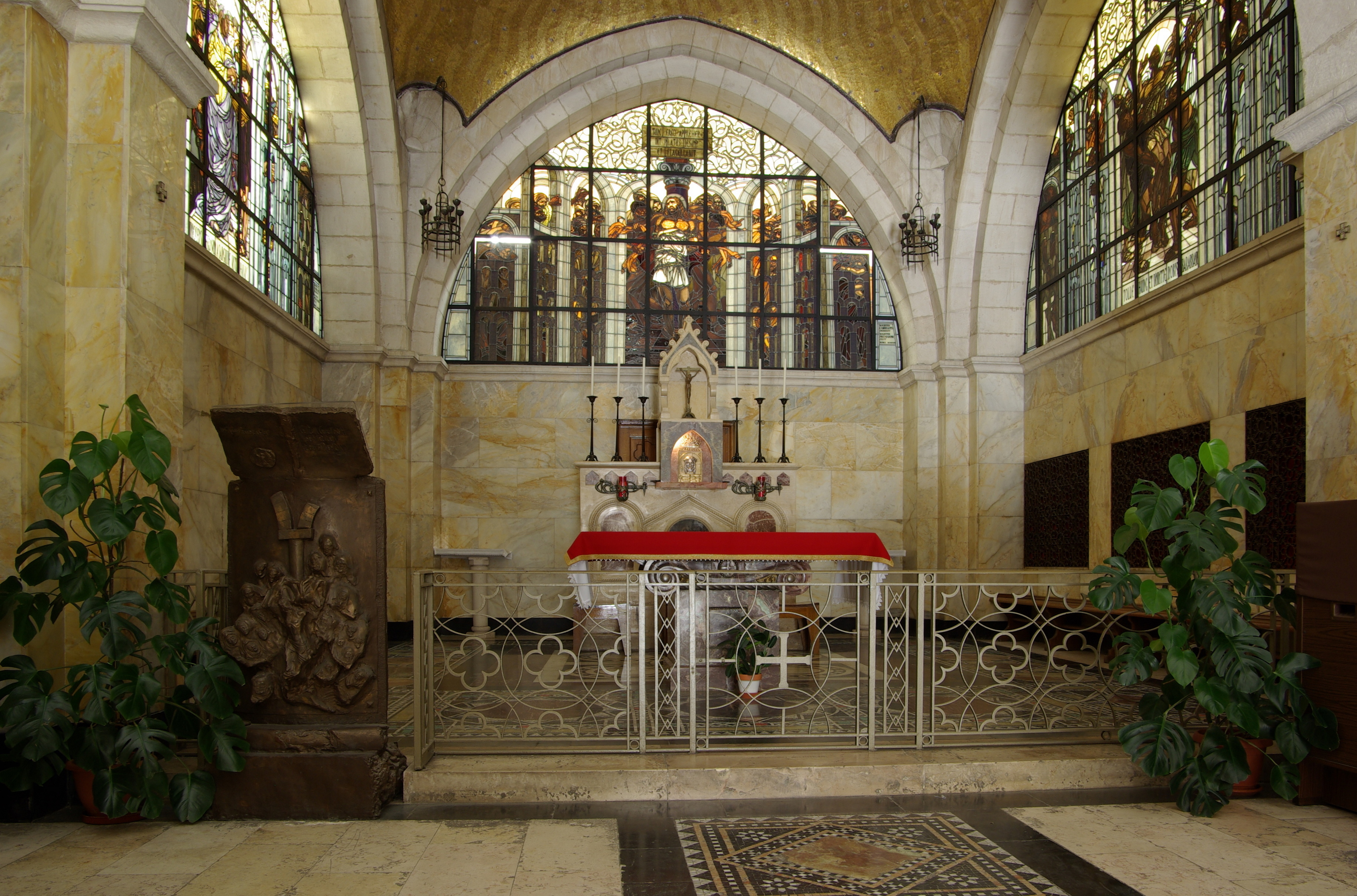
The altar of the church

According to tradition, the church enshrines the spot where Jesus was flogged by Roman soldiers before his journey down the Via Dolorosa to Calvary. However, this tradition is based on the assumption that an area of Roman flagstones, discovered beneath the adjacent Church of the Condemnation and the Convent of the Sisters of Zion, was Gabbatha, or the pavement the Bible describes as the location of Pontius Pilate's judgment of Jesus (John 19, John 19:13). A triple-arched gateway built by Hadrian as an entrance to the eastern forum of Aelia Capitolina was traditionally, but as archaeological investigation shows, mistakenly, said to have been part of the gate of Herod's Antonia Fortress, which was alleged to be the location of Jesus' trial. It is possible that following its destruction the Antonia Fortress's pavement tiles were brought to Hadrian's plaza.

Like Philo, Josephus testifies that the Roman governors stayed in Herod's palace while they were in Jerusalem, carried out their judgements on the pavement immediately outside it, and had those found guilty flogged there; Josephus indicates that Herod's palace is on the western hill, and it has recently (2001) been rediscovered under a corner of the Jerusalem citadel near Jaffa Gate. Archaeologists now therefore conclude that, in the first century, the Roman governors judged at the western hill, rather than the area around the Church of the Flagellation, on the diametrically opposite side of the city.

== History ==
The original church was built by the Crusaders. During the Ottoman period (from 1516), this early shrine and its surrounding buildings were reportedly used as stables, and later as private houses.

The whole complex was given to the Franciscans in 1838 by Ibrahim Pasha of Egypt, who brought parts of Ottoman Syria under Egyptian rule between 1831 and 1841. In 1839 Duke Maximilian Joseph in Bavaria funded a hasty rebuilding of the church over the medieval ruins.

The current church was completed between 1928 and 1929 and was a complete reconstruction, executed by Italian Antonio Barluzzi in the style of the 12th century. The church is held in trust by the Franciscan Custody of the Holy Land.

In February 2023, a Jewish–American tourist vandalized a statue of Jesus within the church with a hammer.

== Description ==
The interior of the church consists of a single aisle.

Some noteworthy points of interest include the three stained glass windows, each depicting a different aspect of the biblical narrative of the trial of Jesus by Pilate, and the inside of the mosaic-clad golden dome. The northern window depicts Pontius Pilate washing his hands (Matthew 27:24), the central one behind the altar depicts the Flagellation (Mark 15:15, John 19:1), and the southern one the victory of Barabbas (Matthew 27:26, Mark 15:15, Luke 23:24–25). The dome with its mosaic and translucent elements is designed as a crown of thorns.
