= Via Dolorosa =

Path in Jerusalem taken by Jesus Christ prior to his crucifixion

Coordinates: 31°46′45.84″N 35°13′55.46″E

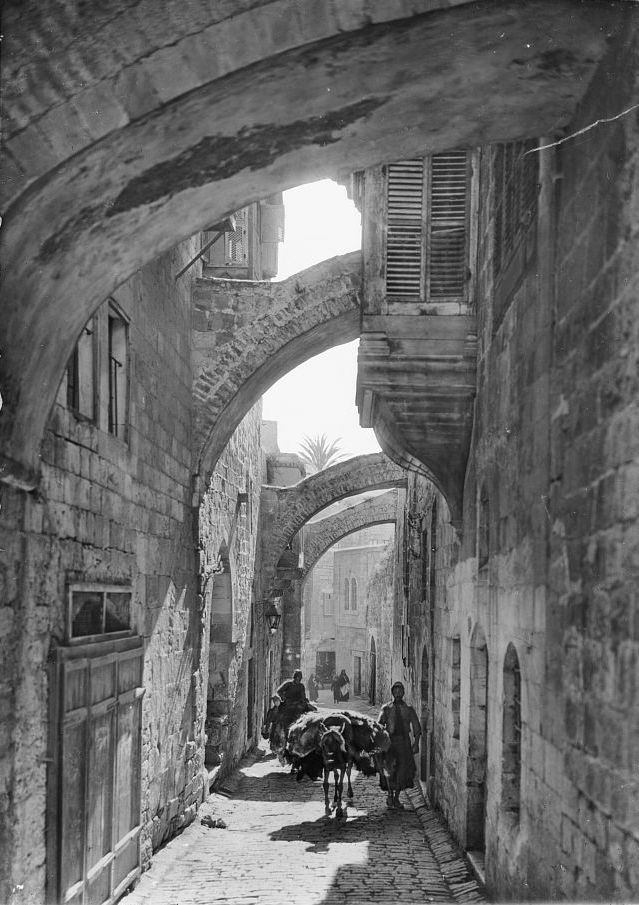
Via Dolorosa, Jerusalem

The Via Dolorosa (Latin for 'Sorrowful Way', often translated as 'Way of Suffering'; Arabic: طريق الآلام, romanized: Ṭarīq al-Ālām; Hebrew: ויה דולורוזה), sometimes known as the Via Crucis (Latin for 'Way of Cross'; Arabic: درب الصليب, romanized: Darb al-ṣalīb, lit. 'Via Crucis'; Hebrew: ויה קרוסיס) is a processional route in the Old City of Jerusalem. It represents the path that Jesus took, forced by the Roman soldiers, on the way to his crucifixion. The winding route from the former Antonia Fortress to the Church of the Holy Sepulchre—a distance of about 600 metres (2,000 ft)—is a celebrated place of Christian pilgrimage. The current route has been established since the 18th century, replacing various earlier versions. Today, it is marked by 14 Stations of the Cross, nine of which are outside, in the streets, with the remaining five stations being currently inside the Church of the Holy Sepulchre.

== History ==
The Via Dolorosa is not one street, but a route consisting of segments of several streets. One of the main segments is the modern remnant of one of the two main east-west routes (Decumanus Maximus) through the Roman city of Aelia Capitolina, as built by Hadrian. Standard Roman city design places the main east-west road through the middle of the city, but the presence of the Temple Mount along much of the eastern side of the city required Hadrian's planners to add an extra east-west road at its north. In addition to the usual central north-south road (Cardo Maximus), which in Jerusalem headed straight up the western hill, a second major north-south road was added down the line of the Tyropoeon Valley; these two cardines converge near the Damascus Gate, close to the Via Dolorosa. If the Via Dolorosa had continued west in a straight line across the two routes, it would have formed a triangular block too narrow to construct standard buildings; the decumanus (now the Via Dolorosa) west of the Cardo was constructed south of its eastern portion, creating the discontinuity in the road still present today.

The first reports of a pilgrimage route corresponding to the Biblical events date from the Byzantine era; during that time, a Holy Thursday procession started from the top of the Mount of Olives, stopped in Gethsemane, entered the Old City at the Lions' Gate, and followed approximately the current route to the Church of the Holy Sepulchre; however, there were no actual stops during the route along the Via Dolorosa itself. By the 8th century, however, the route went via the western hill instead; starting at Gethsemane, it continued to the alleged House of Caiaphas on Mount Zion, then to the Church of Hagia Sophia (viewed as the site of the Praetorium), and finally to the Church of the Holy Sepulchre.

After the split in the Catholic Church, Christians created two separate routes on the western hill and the eastern hill, with each group supporting the route which took pilgrims past the churches they controlled, one arguing that the Roman governor's mansion (Praetorium) was on Mount Zion (where they had churches), the other that it was near the Antonia Fortress (where they had churches).

What the Crusader Kingdom of Jerusalem called Jehoshaphat Street (Via Josaphat) was where present-day Via Dolorosa partly is. (Today's Via Dolorosa extends westward from the western portion of that street.) Near the ruined Antonia Fortress and north of the Templum Domini precinct, Jehoshaphat Street led eastward to the Jehoshaphat Gate (near or at Lions' Gate on Lions' Gate Street), with the Valley of Jehoshaphat (near or in the Kidron Valley) beyond the gate.

In the 14th century, Pope Clement VI achieved some consistency in route with the bull Nuper Carissimae, establishing the Franciscan Custody of the Holy Land, and charging the friars with "the guidance, instruction, and care of Latin pilgrims as well as with the guardianship, maintenance, defense and rituals of the Catholic shrines of the Holy Land". Beginning around 1350, Franciscan friars conducted official tours of the Via Dolorosa, from the Holy Sepulchre to the House of Pilate—opposite the direction travelled by Jesus in the Bible. The route was not reversed until c. 1517, when the Franciscans began to follow the events of Jesus's Passion chronologically—setting out from the House of Pilate and ending with the crucifixion at Golgotha.

From the onset of Franciscan administration, the development of the Via Dolorosa was intimately linked to devotional practices in Europe. The Friars Minor were ardent proponents of devotional meditation as a means to access and understand the Passion. The hours and guides they produced, such as Meditaciones vite Christi (MVC), were widely circulated in Europe.

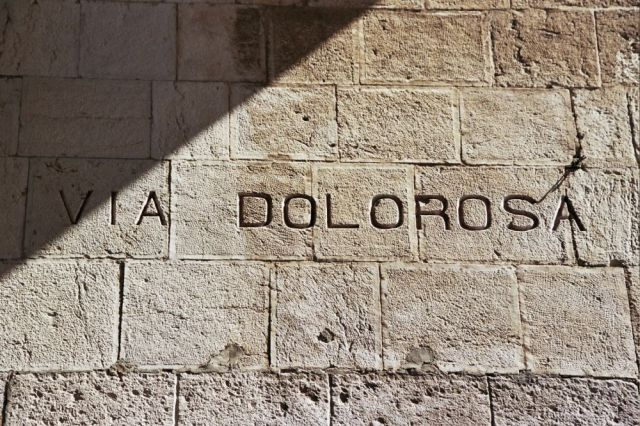
Sign along the Via Dolorosa

Necessarily, such devotional literature expanded on the terse accounts of the Via Dolorosa in the Bible; the period of time between just after Jesus's condemnation by Pilate and just before his crucifixion receives no more than a few verses in the canonical gospels. Throughout the 14th century, a number of events, marked by stations on the Via Dolorosa, emerged in devotional literature and on the physical site in Jerusalem.

The first stations to appear in pilgrimage accounts were the Encounter with Simon of Cyrene and the Daughters of Jerusalem. These were followed by a host of other, more or less ephemeral, stations, such as the House of Veronica, the House of Simon the Pharisee, the House of the Evil Rich Man Who Would Not Give Alms to the Poor, and the House of Herod. In his book, The Stations of the Cross, Herbert Thurston notes: "Whether we look to the sites which, according to the testimony of travelers, were held in honor in Jerusalem itself, or whether we look to the imitation pilgrimages which were carved in stone or set down in books for the devotion of the faithful at home, we must recognize that there was a complete want of any sort of uniformity in the enumeration of the Stations."

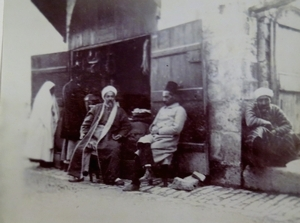
Shop on the Via Dolorosa near the Ecce Homo arch, Jerusalem, 1891

This negotiation of stations, between the European imagination and the physical site would continue for the next six centuries. Only in the 19th century was there general accord on the position of the first, fourth, fifth, and eighth stations. Ironically, archaeological discoveries in the 20th century now indicate that the early route of the Via Dolorosa on the Western hill was actually a more realistic path.

The equation of the present Via Dolorosa with the biblical route is based on the assumption that the Praetorium was adjacent to the Antonia Fortress. However, like Philo, the late 1st-century writer Josephus testifies that the Roman governors of Roman Judaea, who governed from Caesarea Maritima on the coast, stayed in Herod's Palace while they were in Jerusalem, carried out their judgements on the pavement immediately outside it, and had those found guilty flogged there; Josephus indicates that Herod's Palace is on the western hill. In 2001, it was rediscovered under a corner of the Jaffa Gate citadel. Furthermore, archeological reconstruction has shown that prior to Hadrian's 2nd-century alterations (see Aelia Capitolina), the area adjacent to the Antonia Fortress was a large open-air pool of water.

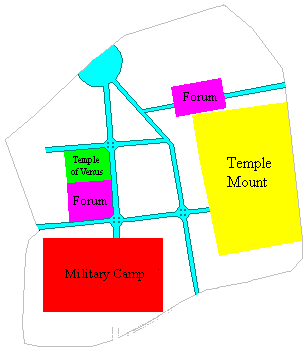
The main roads—the cardines (north-south) and decumani (east-west)—in Aelia Capitolina. The Via Dolorosa is the northern decumanus

In 2009, Israeli archaeologist Shimon Gibson found the remains of a large paved courtyard south of the Jaffa Gate between two fortification walls, with an outer gate and an inner gate leading to a barracks. The courtyard contained a raised platform of around 2 square metres (22 ft^{2}). A survey of the ruins of the Praetorium, long thought to be the Roman barracks, indicated that it was no more than a watchtower. These findings together "correspond perfectly" with the route as described in the gospels and match details found in other ancient writings.

The route traced by Gibson begins in a parking lot in the Armenian Quarter, then passes the Ottoman walls of the Old City next to the Tower of David near the Jaffa Gate before turning towards the Church of the Holy Sepulchre. The new research also indicates that the crucifixion site is around 20 metres (66 ft) from the traditionally accepted site.

However, there are at least two arguments in favor of the traditional route and for Antonia fortress as the place of judgement:

1. During the greatest pilgrimage feast, when hundreds of thousands came to the Temple, Pilate naturally had to be with his garrison next to the Temple mount as a potential focus of the uprising, and certainly the favorite place of religious and national zealots who wished independence from Rome.

2. According to Luke's Gospel (23:6–13), Pilate found out that Christ was from Galilee, "and when he knew that he was of Herod's jurisdiction, he sent him unto Herod, who himself also was at Jerusalem in these days" (23:7). Herod Antipas, who came for the holiday from Galilee to Jerusalem, disappointed and angry because of Jesus’ silence, "sent him back to Pilate" (23:11), who then "called together the chief priests and the rulers and the people" (23:13). It seems that Pilate was not in Herod's castle. If the trial had taken place in Herod's castle, he could have simply asked Herod to come to the courtroom, as he summoned the chief priests and the leaders.

== The 14 stations ==
The traditional route starts about 200 metres (660 ft) inside (west of) the Lions' Gate (St. Stephen's Gate) in the Muslim Quarter, at the Umariya Elementary School, near the location of the former Antonia Fortress. Continuing from Lions' Gate Street, the route makes its way westward through the Old City to the Church of the Holy Sepulchre in the Christian Quarter. The current enumeration is partly based on a circular devotional walk, organised by the Franciscans in the 14th century; their devotional route, heading east along the Via Dolorosa (the opposite direction to the usual westward pilgrimage), began and ended at the Church of the Holy Sepulchre, also passing through both Gethsemane and Mount Zion during its course.

Whereas the names of many roads in Jerusalem are translated into English, Hebrew, and Arabic for their signs, the name used in Hebrew is Via Dolorosa, transliterated. The Arabic name is the translation of 'way of pain' (طريق الآلام Ṭarīq al-ʾĀlām).

The series of 14 stations currently commemorate the fourteen following episodes:

1. The place where Jesus was condemned to death;
2. Jesus is made to bear his cross (Church of the Flagellation/Church of the Imposition of the Cross and Church of Ecce Homo);
3. Jesus falls for the first time;
4. Jesus meets his mother (Church of Our Lady of Sorrows);
5. Simon of Cyrene is made to bear the cross (Chapel of Simon of Cyrene);
6. Veronica wipes Jesus' face;
7. Jesus falls for the second time;
8. The women of Jerusalem weep over Jesus;
9. Jesus falls for the third time;
10. Jesus is stripped of his garments;
11. Jesus is nailed to the cross;
12. Jesus dies on the cross;
13. Jesus is taken down from the cross; and
14. Jesus is placed in the sepulchre.

=== Trial by Pilate: stations one and two ===
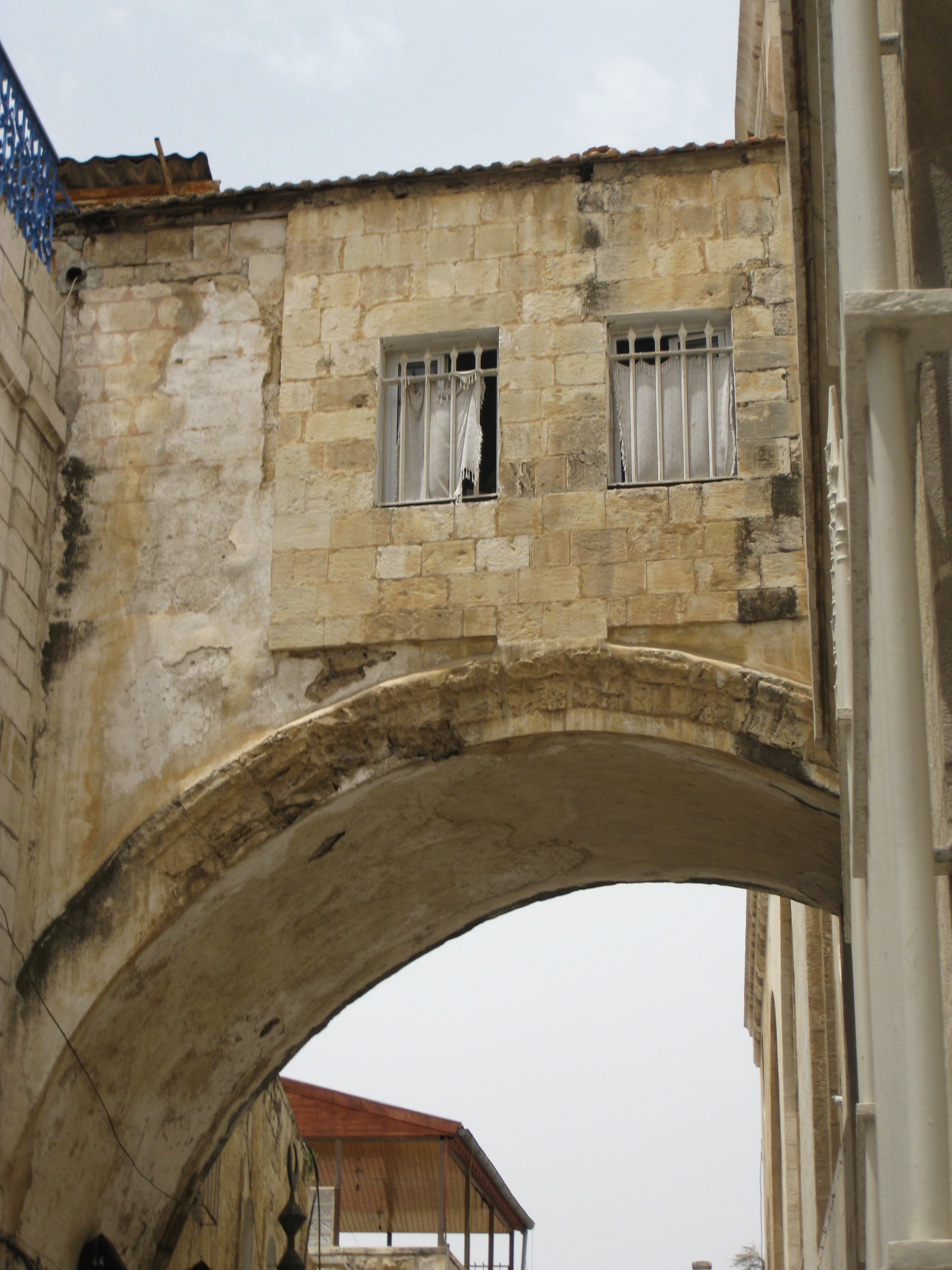
The central Ecce homo arch, now partially hidden by subsequent construction

The first and second stations commemorate the events of Jesus' encounter with Pontius Pilate, the former in memorial of the biblical account of the trial and Jesus' subsequent scourging, and the latter in memorial of the Ecce homo speech, attributed by the Gospel of John to Pilate. Some biblical scholars propose that Pilate likely carried out his judgements at the now destroyed Antonia Palace, at the southwest side of the city, in what is now the Umariya Elementary School. Although others suggest that it had taken place at Herod's Palace, located near the present Tower of David to the west of the Holy Sepulchre. Adjacent to it, there are two Catholic compounds taking their names from these events: a Franciscan monastery including the Church of the Condemnation and Imposition of the Cross and the Church of the Flagellation, and the Convent of the Sisters of Zion, including the Church of Ecce Homo; a large area of Roman paving, beneath these structures, was traditionally regarded as Gabbatha, or 'the pavement' described in the Bible as the location of Pilate's judgment of Jesus.

Archaeological studies have confirmed that an arch at these two traditional stations was built by Hadrian as the triple-arched gateway of the eastern of two forums. Prior to Hadrian's construction, the area had been a large open-air pool of water, the Struthion Pool mentioned by Josephus. When later building works narrowed the Via Dolorosa, the two arches on either side of the central arch became incorporated into a succession of buildings; the Church of Ecce Homo now preserves the northern arch.

The three northern churches were gradually built after the site was partially acquired in 1857 by Marie-Alphonse Ratisbonne, a Jesuit who intended to use it as a base for proselytizing the Jews. The most recent church of the three—the Church of the Flagellation—was built during the 1920s; above the high altar, under the central dome, is a mosaic on a golden ground showing the Crown of Thorns Pierced by Stars, and the church also contains modern stained-glass windows depicting Christ Scourged at the Pillar, Pilate Washing his Hands, and the Freeing of Barabbas. The Convent, which includes the Church of Ecce Homo, was the first part of the complex to be built, and contains the most extensive archaeological remains. Prior to Ratisbonne's purchase, the site had lain in ruins for many centuries; the Crusaders had previously constructed a set of buildings here, but they were later abandoned.

=== The three falls: stations three, seven, and nine ===
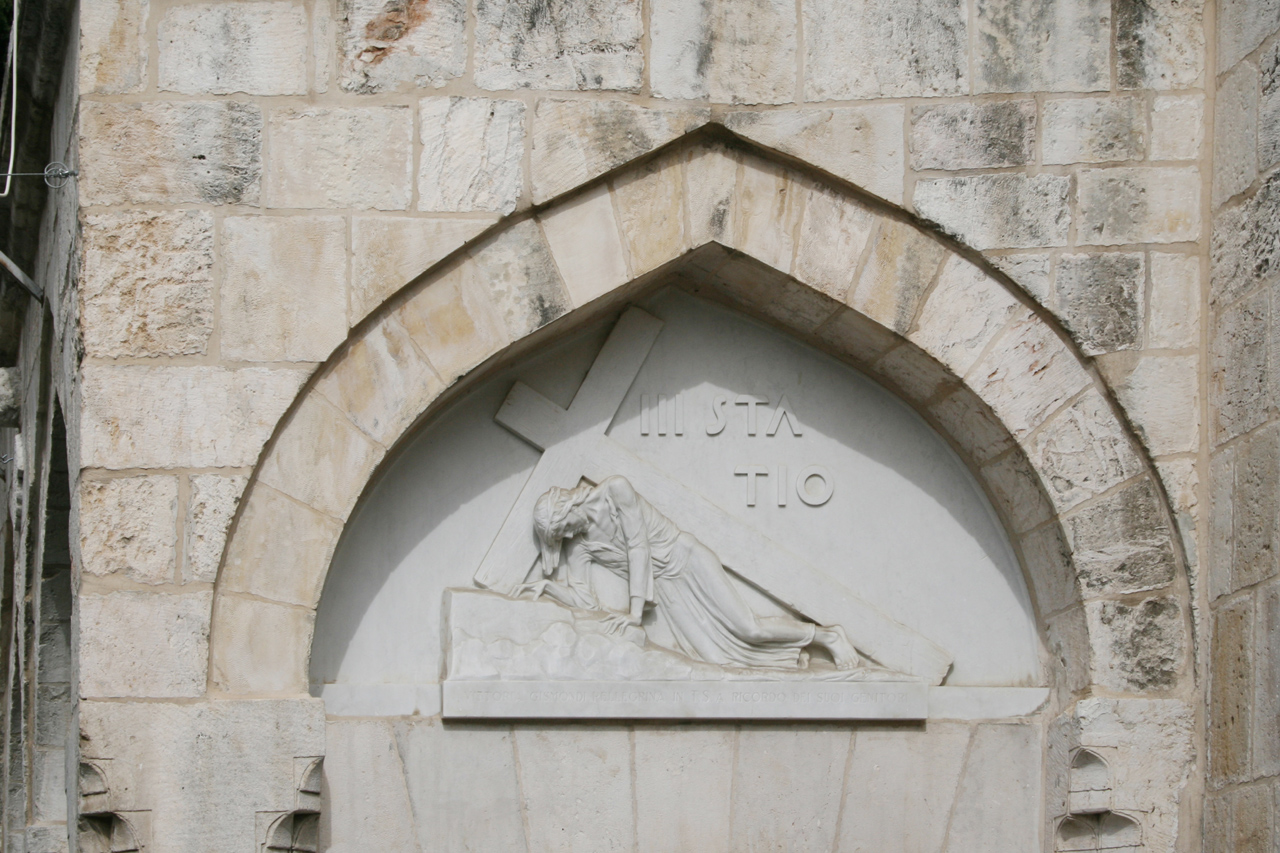
The exterior of the Polish Catholic Chapel at the third station

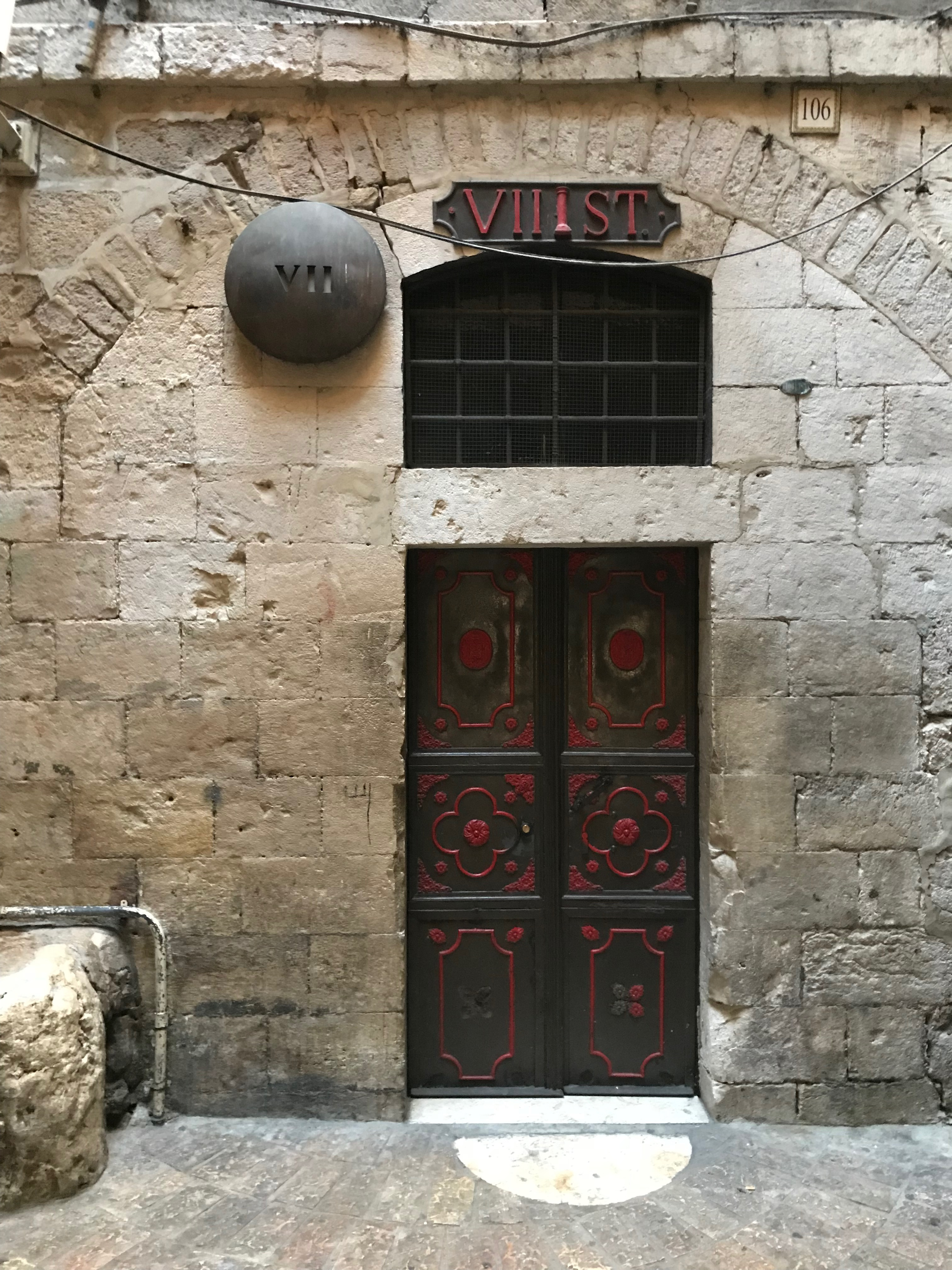
Exterior of the 7th station, 2017

Christian tradition holds that Jesus stumbled three times during his walk along the route; this belief is currently manifested in the identification of the three stations at which these falls occurred. Tradition holds that Mary, the mother of Jesus, set up stone markers at her home outside Jerusalem to retrace the steps of her son's Passion, but the origin of the devotion in its present form is not clear.

The first fall is represented by the current third station, located at the west end of the eastern fraction of the Via Dolorosa, adjacent to the 19th-century Polish Catholic Chapel; this chapel was constructed by the Armenian Catholics. The 1947–48 renovations, to the 19th-century chapel, were carried out with the aid of a large financial grant from the Polish army. The site was previously one of the city's hammams.

The second fall is represented by the current seventh station, located at a major crossroad junction, adjacent to a Franciscan chapel, built in 1875. In Hadrian's era, this was the junction of the main cardo (north-south road), with the decumanus (east-west road) which became the Via Dolorosa; the remains of a tetrapylon, which marked this Roman junction, can be seen in the lower level of the Franciscan chapel. Prior to the 16th century, this location was the 8th and last station. The seventh station is located within the modern-day Suq Khan az-Zait.

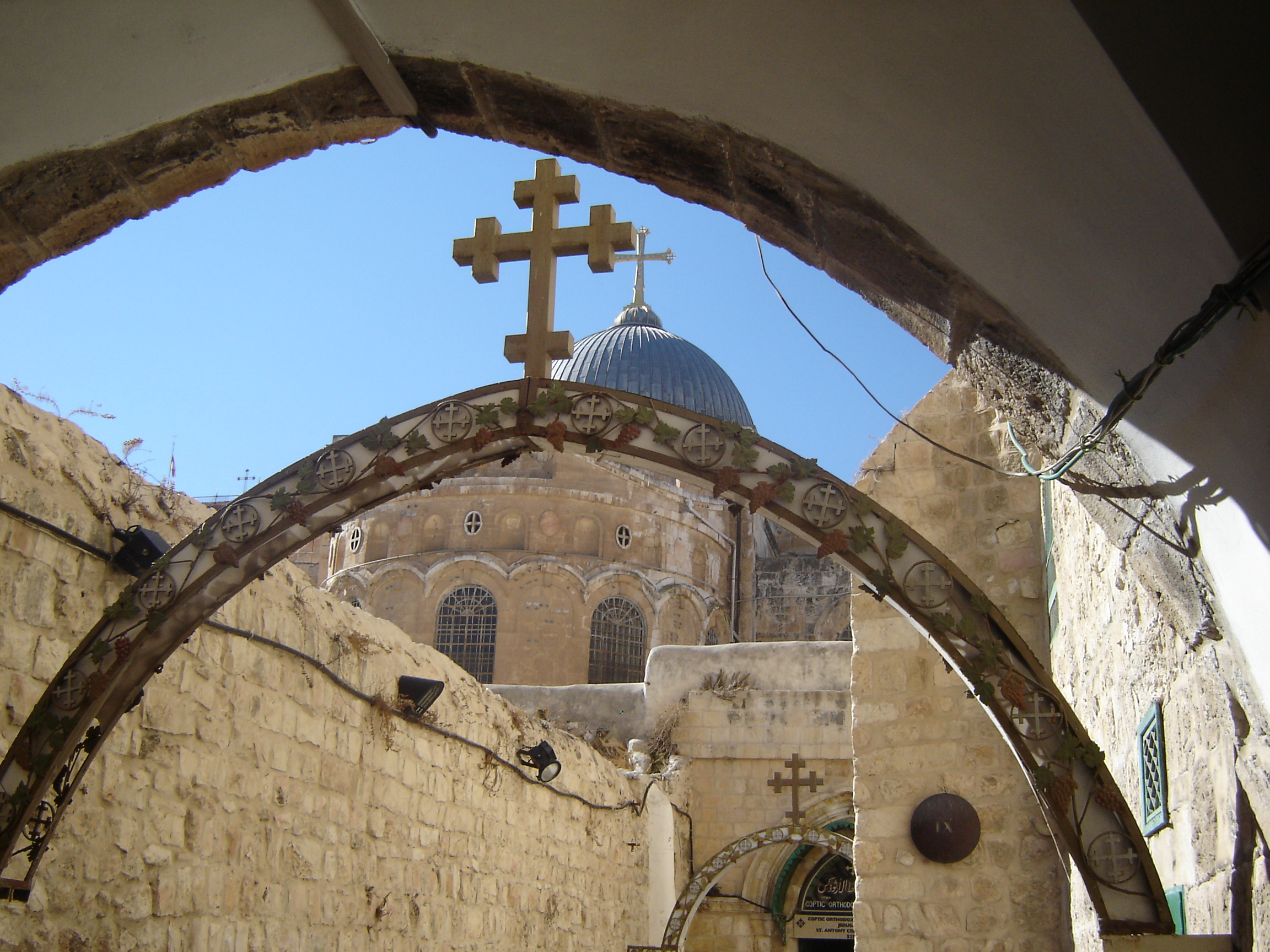
The ninth station, signified by the black disc on the wall. In the background is the entree to the Coptic Orthodox Patriarchate. The alley is parallel to and south of the Via Dolorosa.

The third fall is represented by the current ninth station, which is not actually located on the Via Dolorosa, instead being located at the entrance to the Ethiopian Orthodox Monastery and the Coptic Orthodox Monastery of Saint Anthony, which together form the roof structure of the subterranean Chapel of Saint Helena in the Church of the Holy Sepulchre; the Coptic and Ethiopian Orthodox churches split in 1959, and prior to that time the monastic buildings were considered a single monastery. However, in the early 16th century, the third fall was located at the entrance courtyard to the Church of the Holy Sepulchre, and an engraved stone cross signifying this remains in situ. Prior to the 15th century, the final station was located before this point would have been reached.

=== The encounters ===
Four stations commemorate encounters between Jesus and other people, in the city streets.

==== With Mary, Jesus' mother: fourth station ====
Christian tradition holds that Mary approached her son during his way of the cross. The fourth station, the location of the Armenian Catholic Church of Our Lady of Sorrows, commemorates these events; a lunette, over the entrance to the chapel, references these events by means of a bas-reliefcarved by the Polish artist Jerzy Zieliński. The oratory, named Our Lady of the Spasm, was built in 1881, but its crypt preserves some archaeological remains from former Byzantine buildings on the site, including a mosaic floor.

==== With Simon of Cyrene: fifth station ====
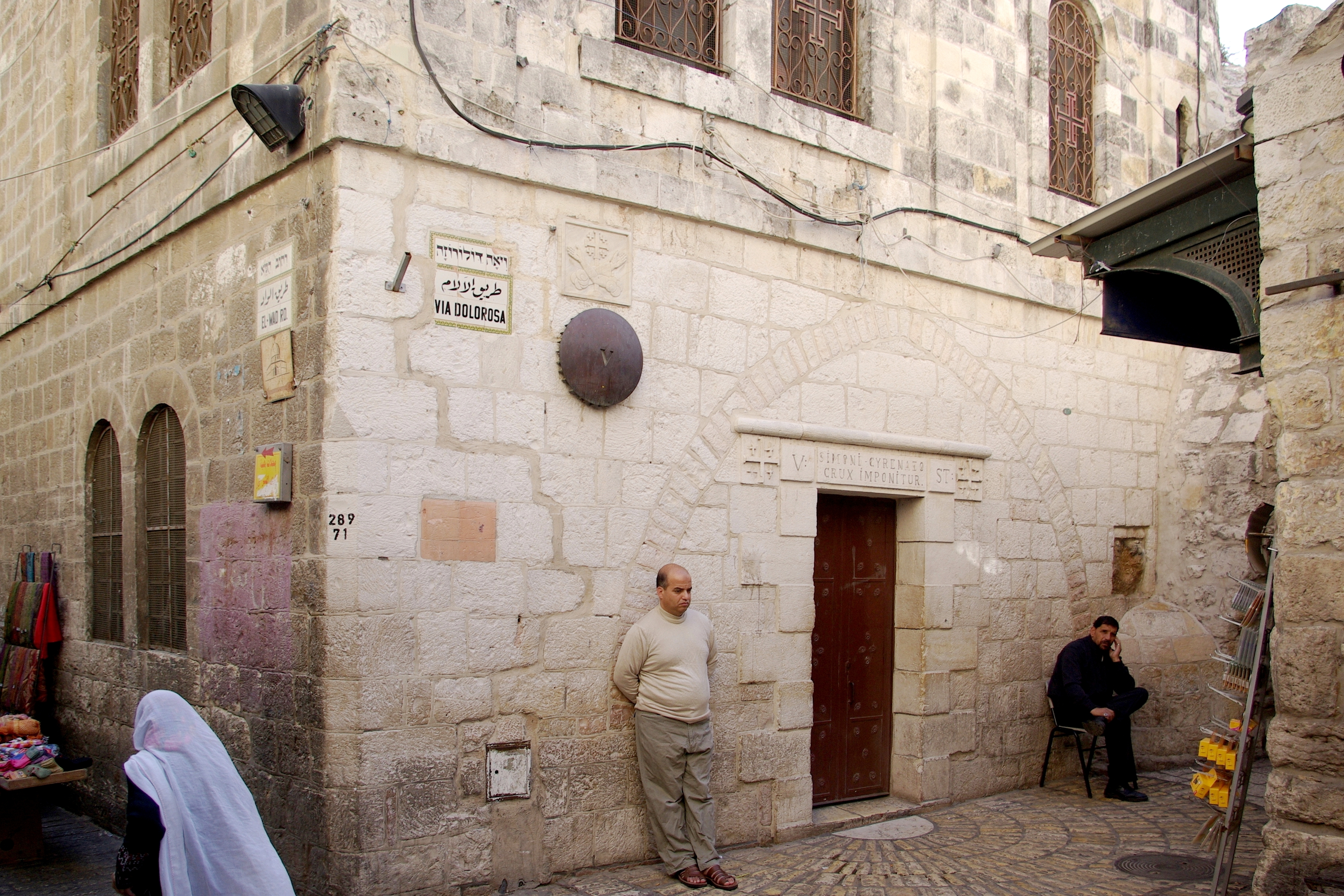
The exterior of the Chapel of Simon of Cyrene, at the fifth station

The fifth station refers to the biblical episode in which Simon of Cyrene takes Jesus' cross, and carries it for him. This narrative is included in the three Synoptic Gospels. The current traditional site for the station is located at the east end of the western fraction of the Via Dolorosa, adjacent to the Chapel of Simon of Cyrene, a Franciscan construction built in 1895. An inscription, in the architrave of one of the Chapel doors, references the Synoptic events.

Prior to the 15th century, this location was instead considered to be the House of the Poor Man, and honoured as the fifth station for that reason; the name refers to the Lukan tale of Lazarus and Dives, this Lazarus being a beggar, and dives being the Latin word for '[one who is] Rich'. Adjacent to the alleged House of the Poor Man is an arch over the road; the house on the arch was thought to be the corresponding House of the Rich Man. The houses in question, however, only date to the Middle Ages, and the narrative of Lazarus and Dives is now widely held to be a parable.

==== With Veronica: sixth station ====
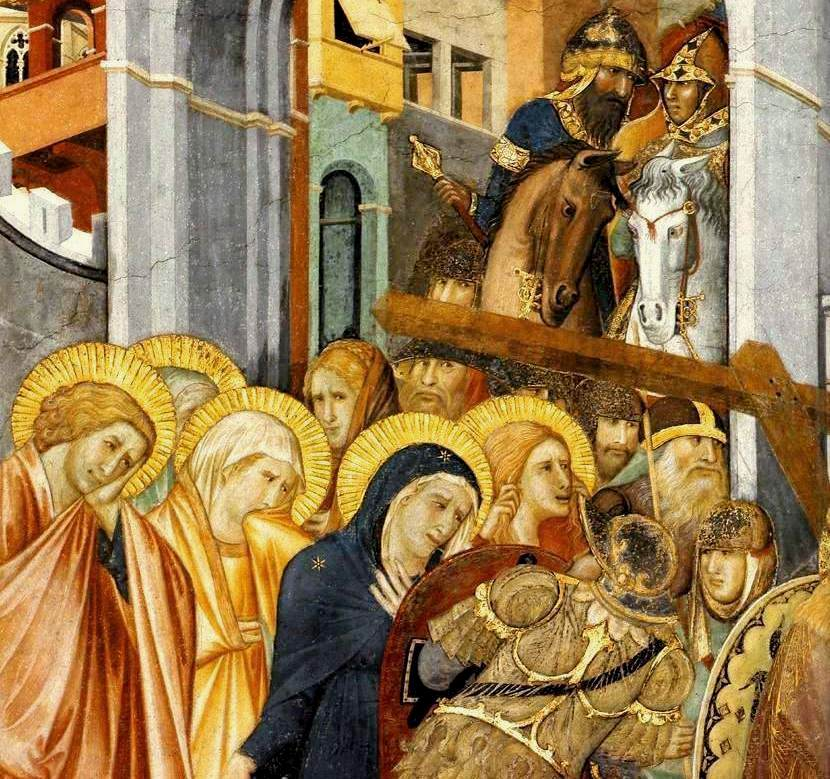
Pietro Lorenzetti's fresco of women following Jesus on Via Dolorosa, Assisi, 1320

A medieval Catholic legend viewed a specific piece of cloth, known as the Veil of Veronica, as having been supernaturally imprinted with Jesus' image, by physical contact with Jesus' face. By metathesis of the Latin words vera icon (meaning 'true image') into Veronica, it came to be said that the Veil of Veronica had gained its image when a Saint Veronica encountered Jesus, and wiped the sweat from his face with the cloth; no element of this legend is present in the Bible, although the similar Image of Edessa is mentioned in The Epistles of Jesus Christ and Abgarus King of Edessa, a late piece of New Testament apocrypha. The Veil of Veronica relates to a pre-Crucifixion image, and is distinct from the post-Crucifixion Holy Face image, often related to the Shroud of Turin.

The current sixth station of the Via Dolorosa commemorates this moment when a woman is said to have wiped the sweat from Jesus' face with a cloth. The location was identified as the site of the encounter in the 19th century; in 1883, Greek Catholics purchased the 12th-century ruins at the location, and built the Church of the Holy Face and Saint Veronica on them, claiming that Veronica had encountered Jesus outside her own house, and that the house had formerly been positioned at this spot. The church includes some of the remains of the 12th-century buildings which had formerly been on the site, including arches from the Crusader-built Monastery of Saint Cosmas. The present building is administered by the Little Sisters of Jesus, and is not generally open to the public.

==== With pious women: eighth station ====
The eighth station commemorates an episode described by the Gospel of Luke, alone among the canonical gospels, in which Jesus encounters pious women on his journey, and is able to stop and speak to them. However, prior to the 15th century the final station in Jesus' walk was believed to occur at a point earlier on the Via Dolorosa, before this location would have been reached. The present eighth station is adjacent to the Greek Orthodox Monastery of Saint Charalampus; it is marked by the letters IC XC / Nika carved into the wall, and an embossed cross.

== Modern processions ==
Each Friday, a Catholic procession walks the Via Dolorosa route, starting out at the monastic complex by the first station; the procession is organized by the Franciscans of this monastery, who also lead the procession. Acted re-enactments also regularly take place on the route, ranging from amateur productions with, for example, soldiers wearing plastic helmets and vivid red polyester wraps, to more professional drama with historically accurate clothing and props.

The seat of the Coptic Orthodox Patriarchate in Jerusalem is located on the roof of the Church of the Holy Sepulchre. At the entrance of the Patriarchate is a column with a cross on it, marking the 9th Station of the Via Dolorosa. In 1980 Pope Shenouda III of Alexandria (3 August 1923 – 17 March 2012) had forbidden Coptic faithful from traveling to Jerusalem on pilgrimage until the Israeli-Palestinian conflict was resolved. However, despite the ban, dozens of Coptic pilgrims travel to Jerusalem every year, especially during the Easter holidays.

== Image gallery of the fourteen stations ==
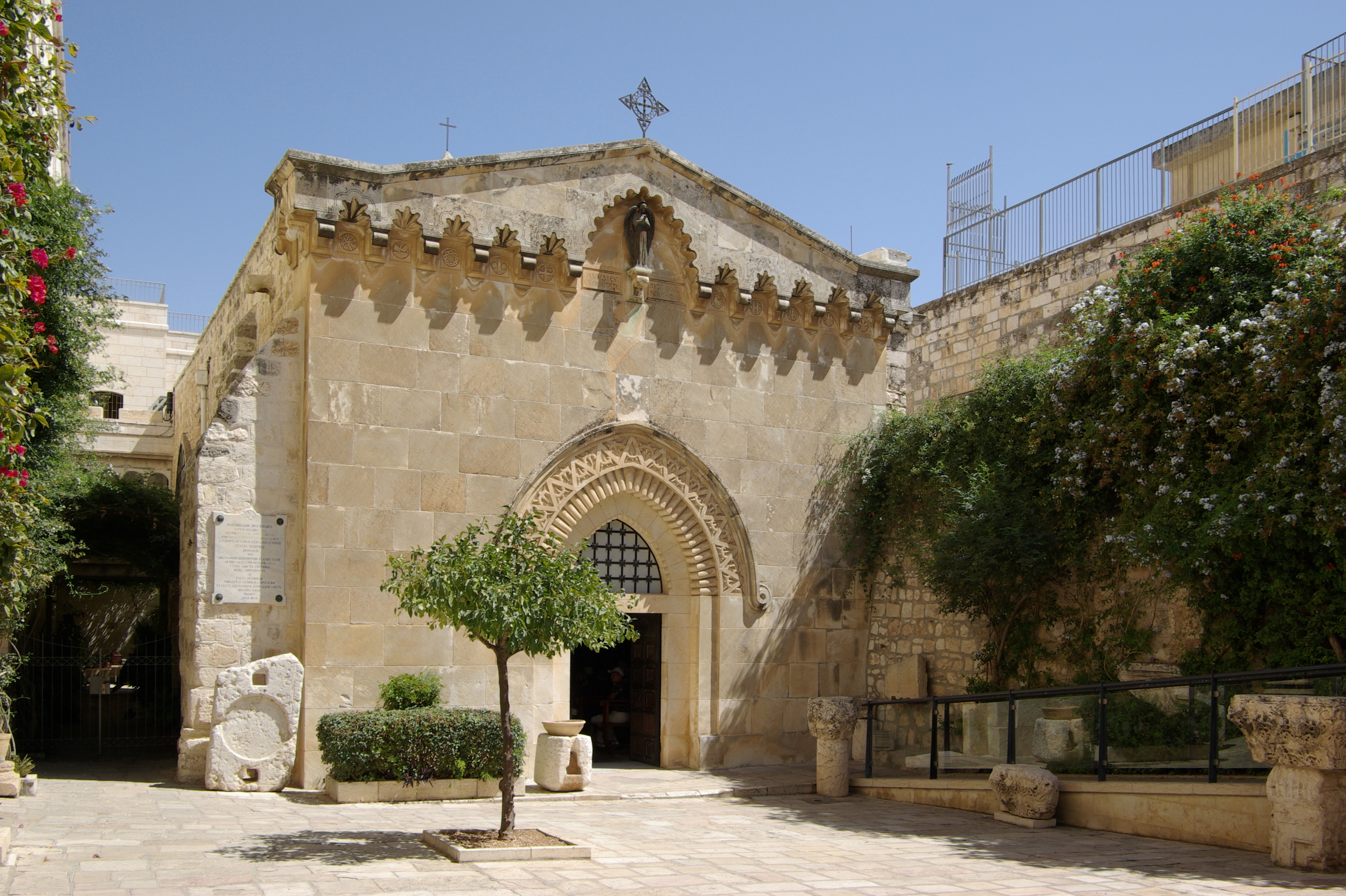
1st Station – Jesus is condemned to death

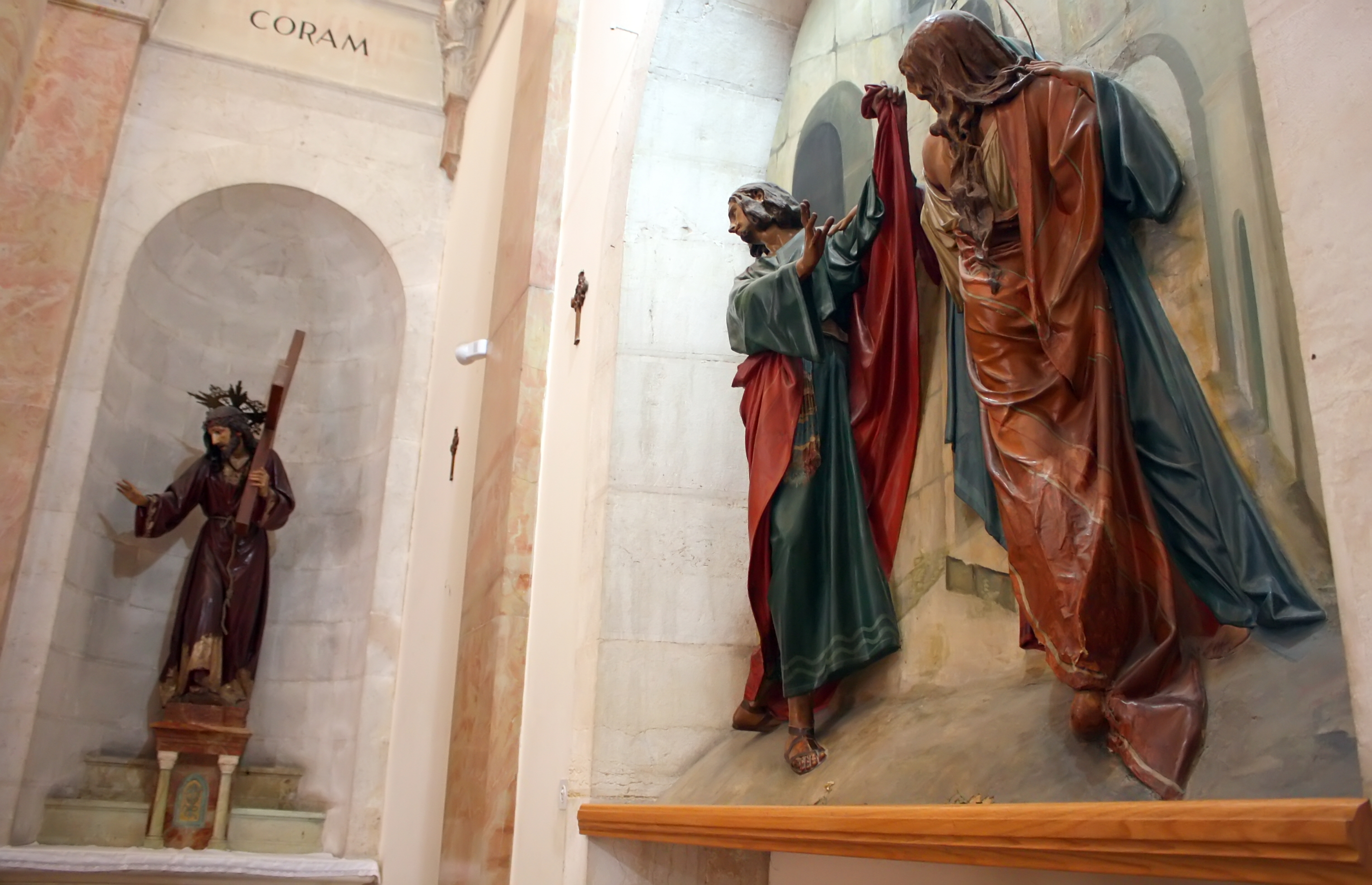
2nd Station – Jesus carries his cross

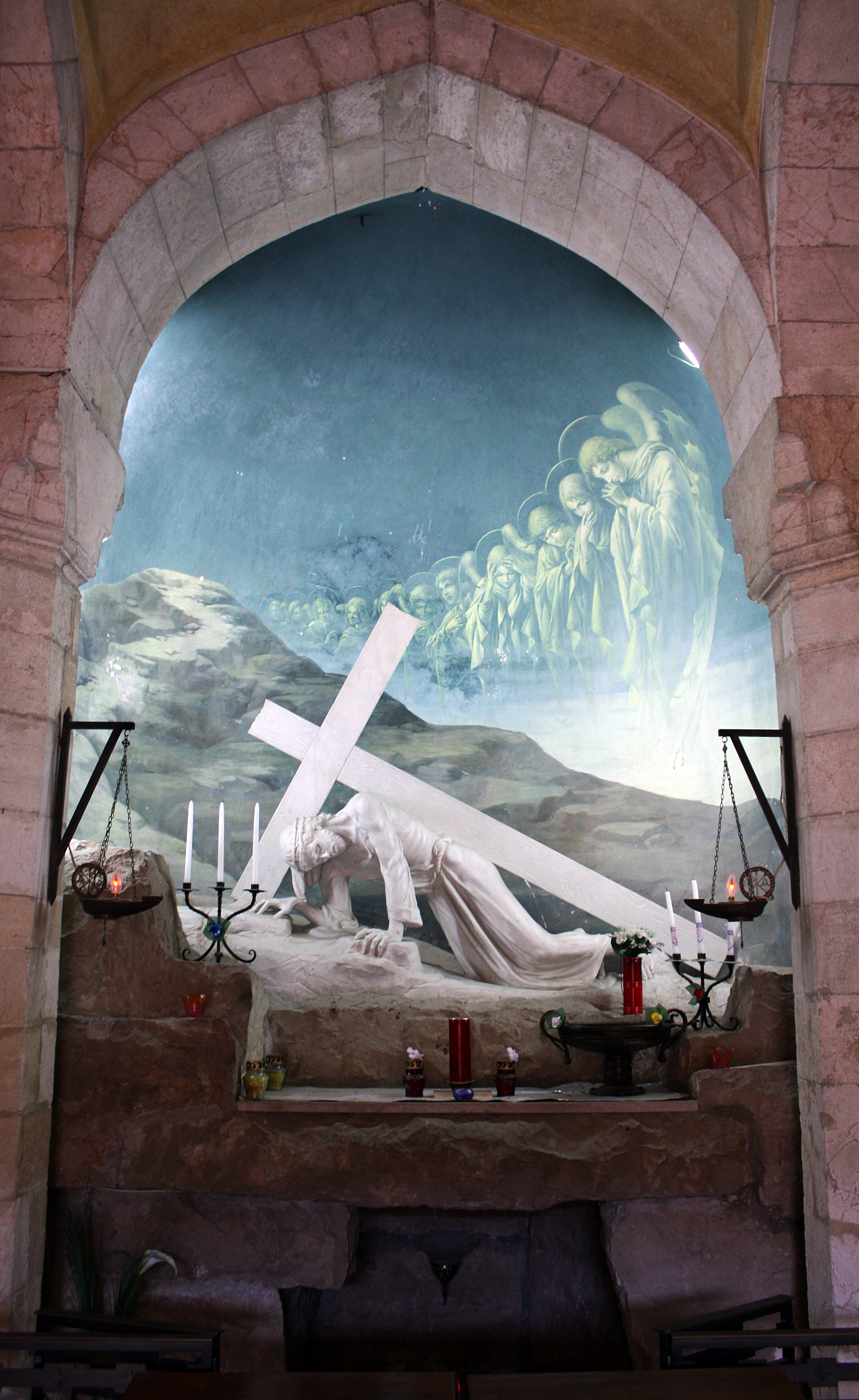
3rd Station – Jesus falls the first time

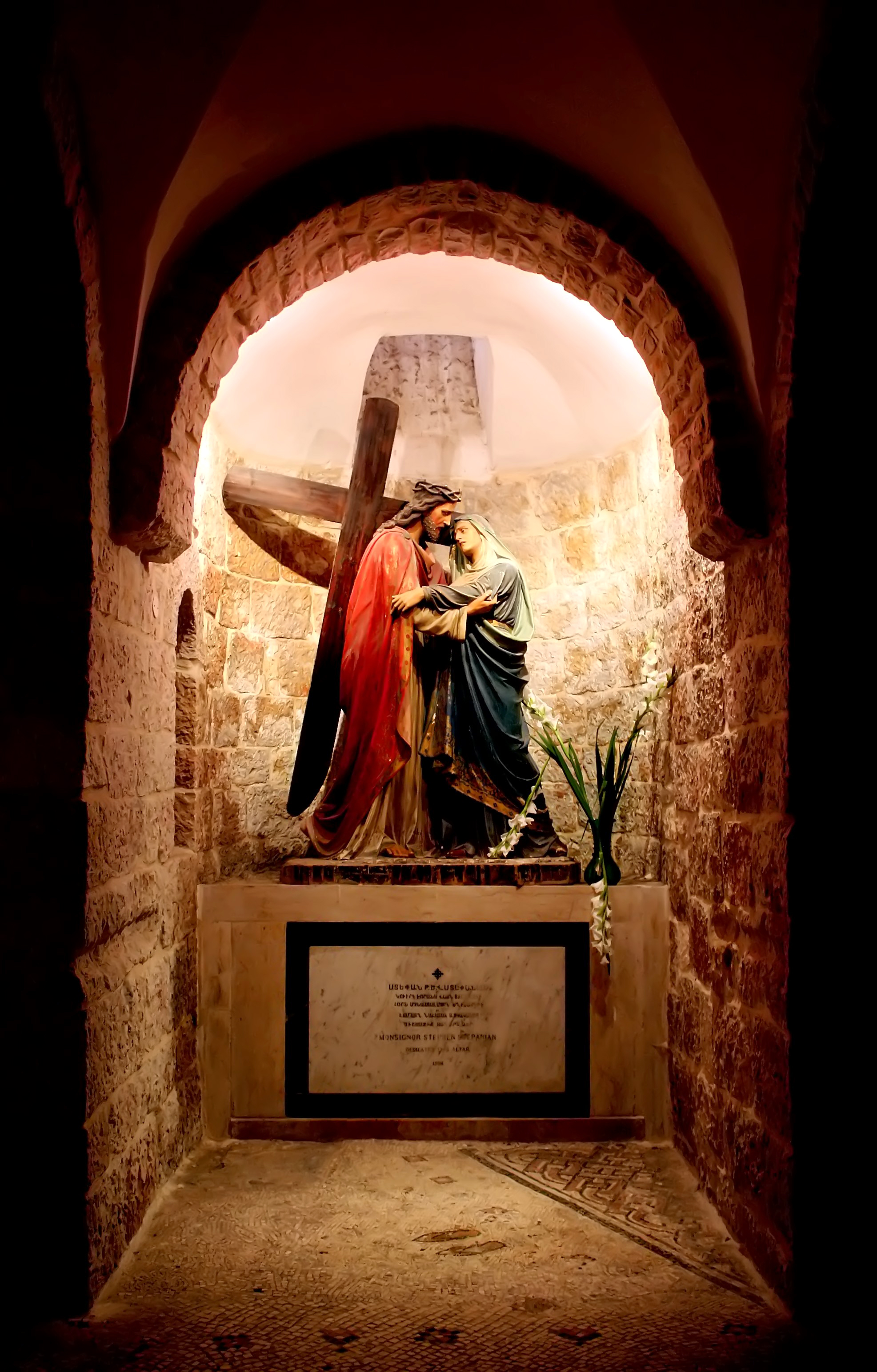
4th Station – Jesus meets his mother

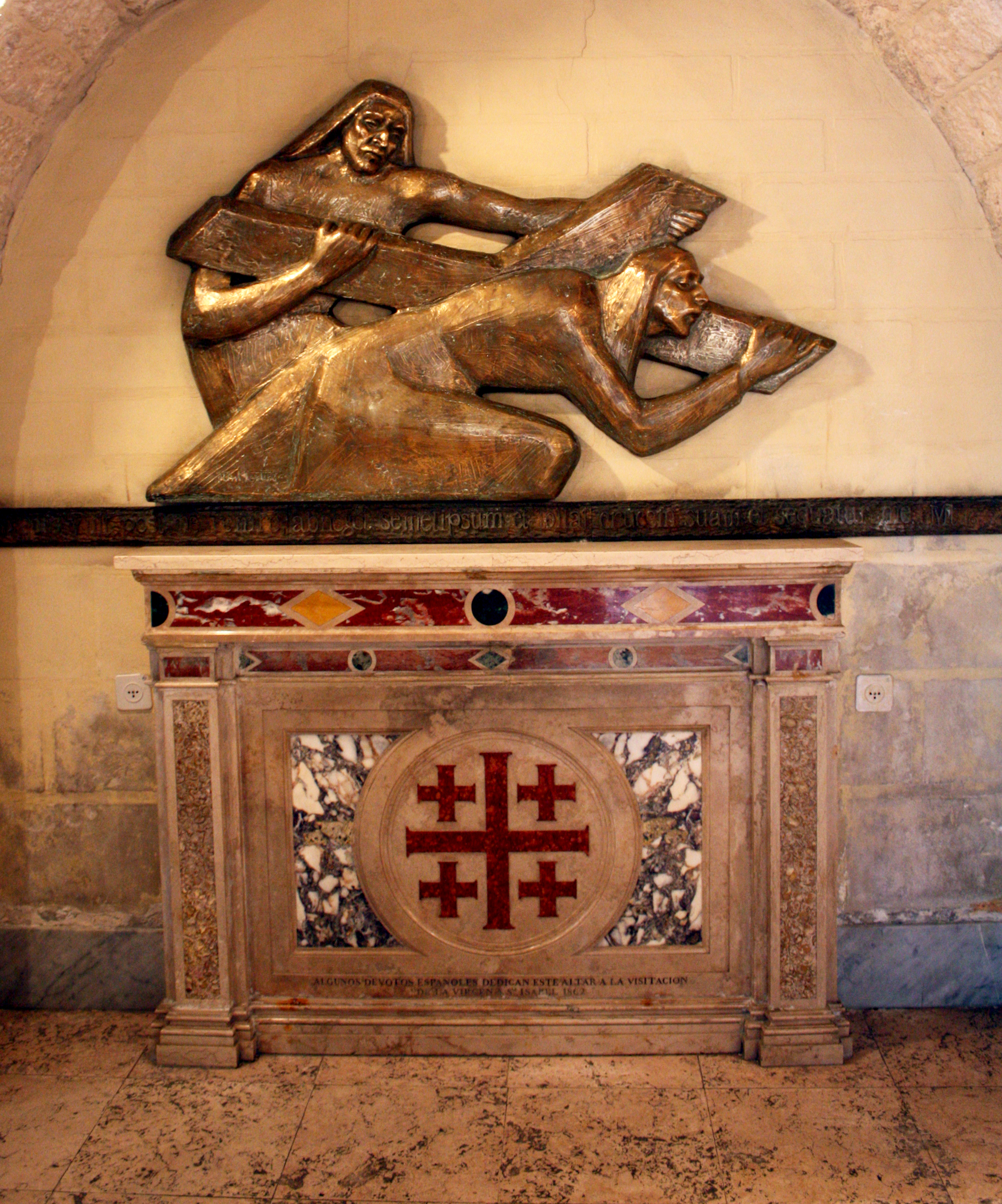
5th Station – Simon of Cyrene helps Jesus carry the cross

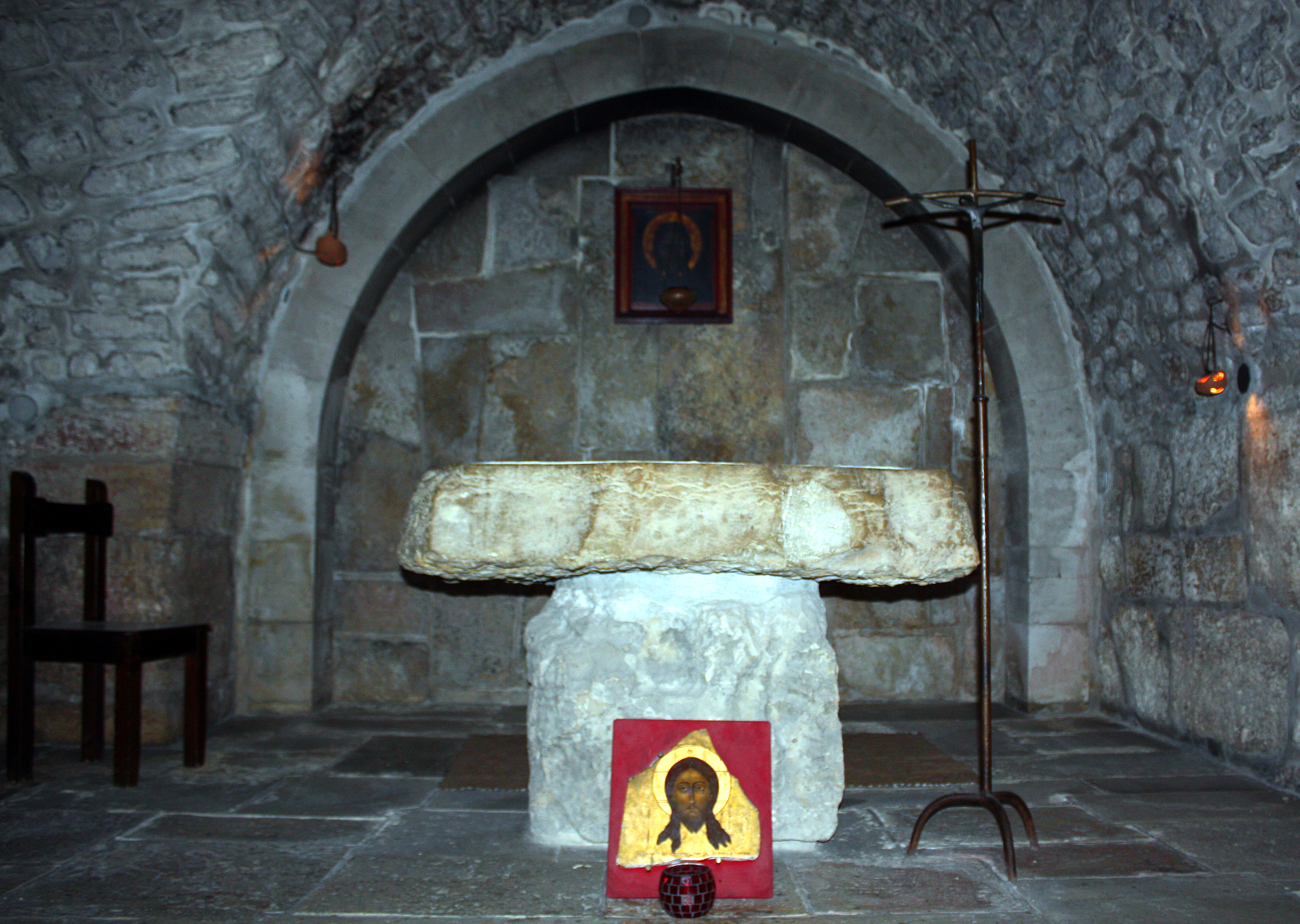
6th Station – Veronica wipes the face of Jesus

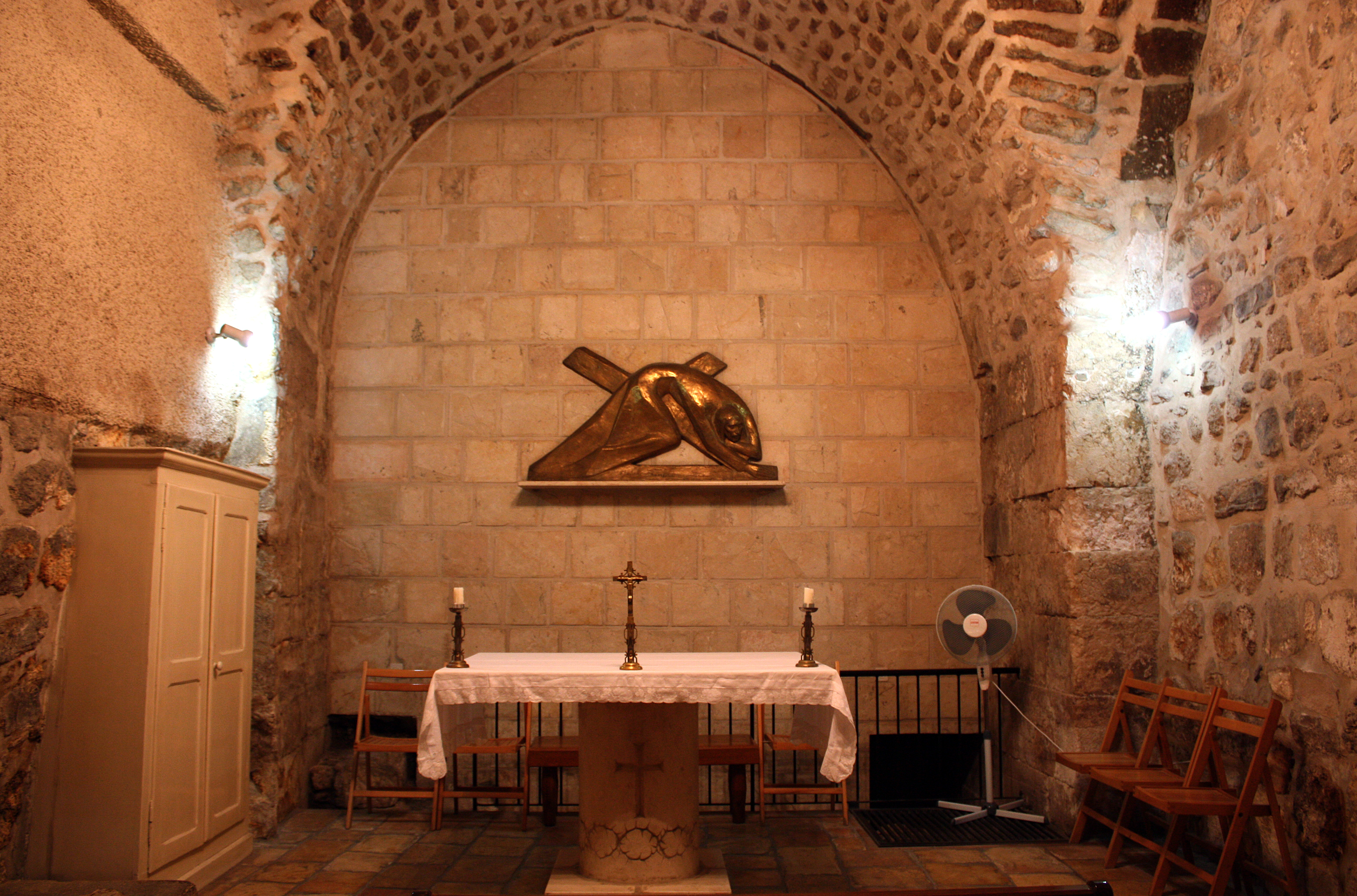
7th Station – Jesus falls the second time

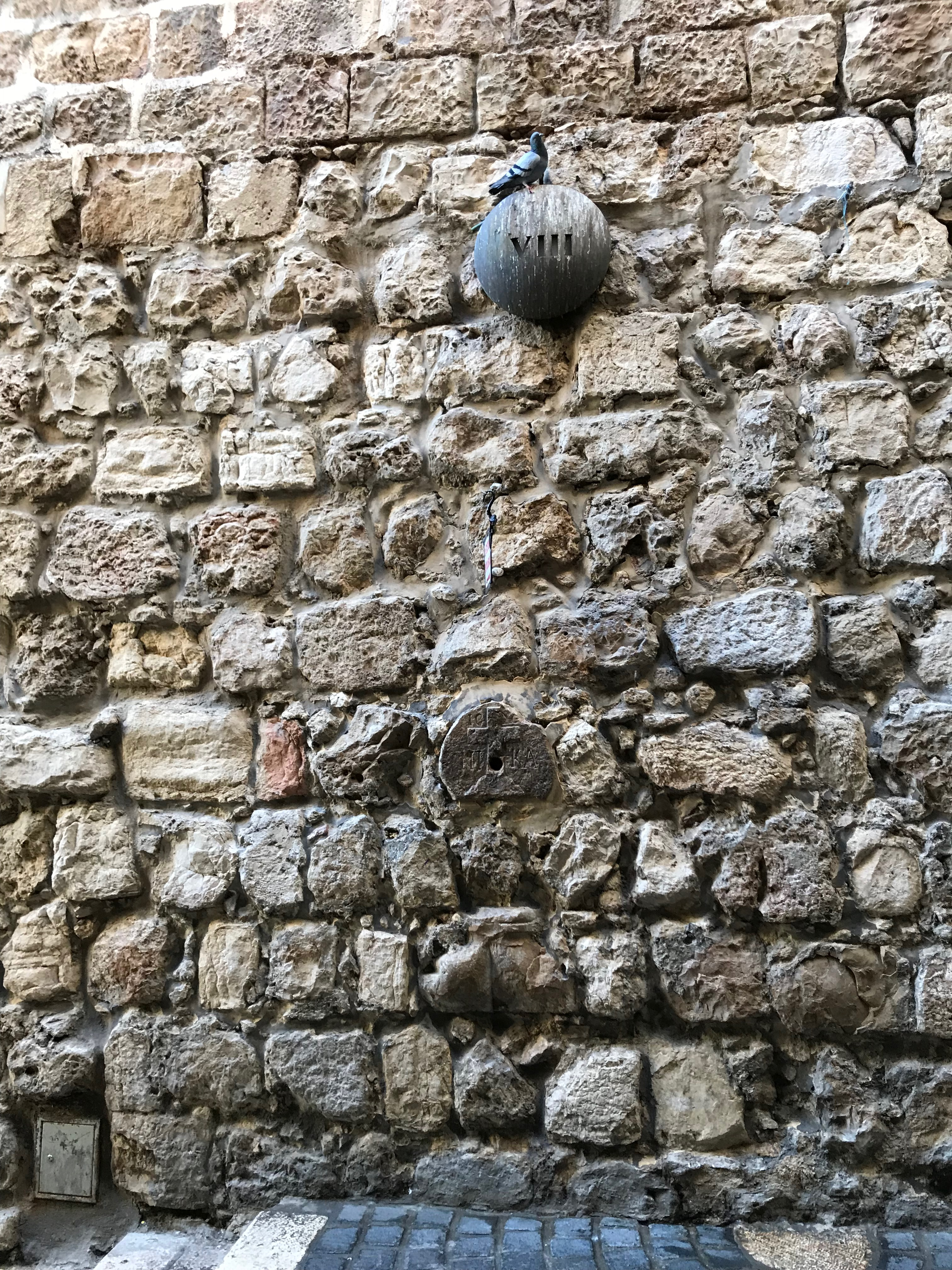
8th Station – Jesus meets the women of Jerusalem

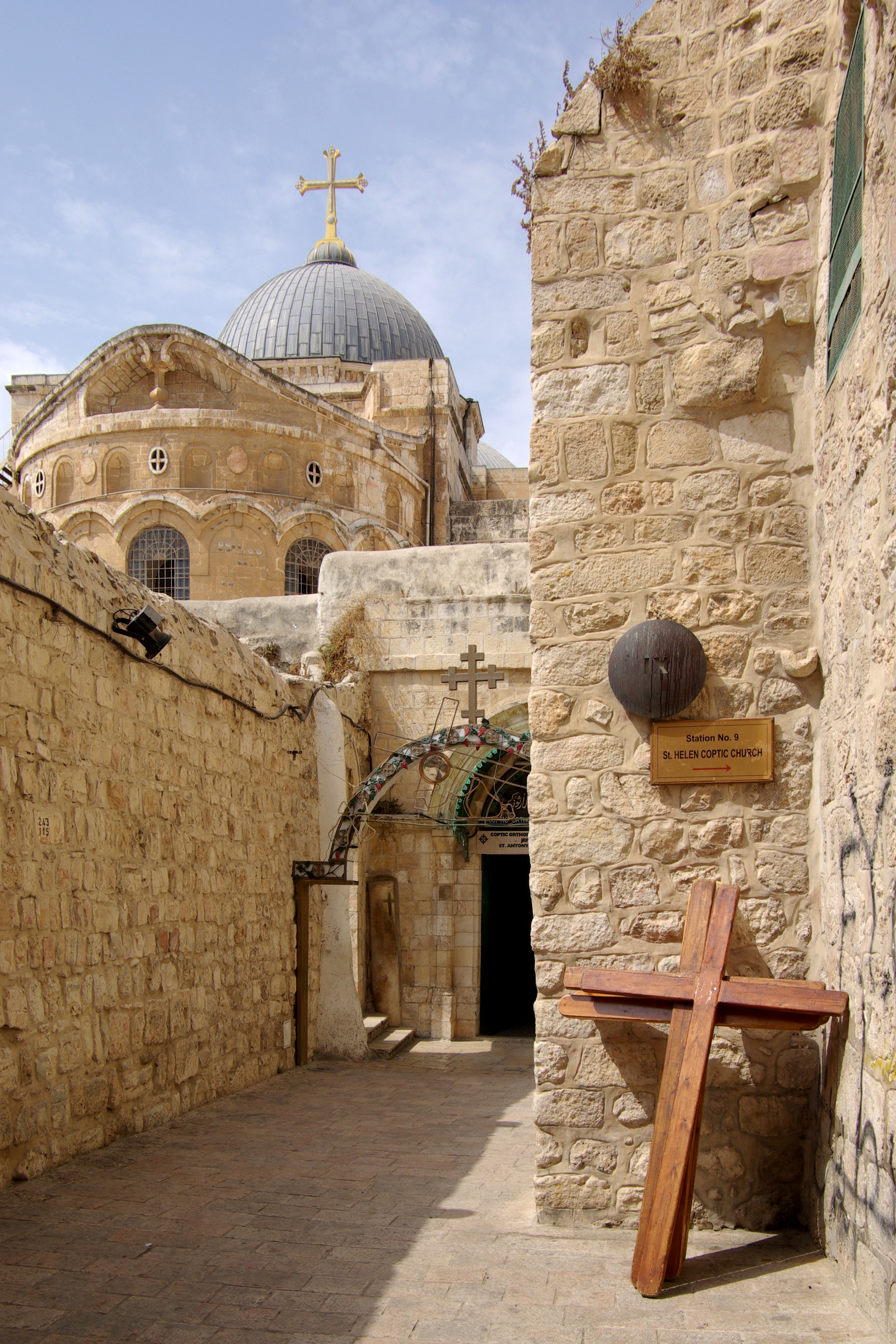
9th Station – Jesus falls the third time

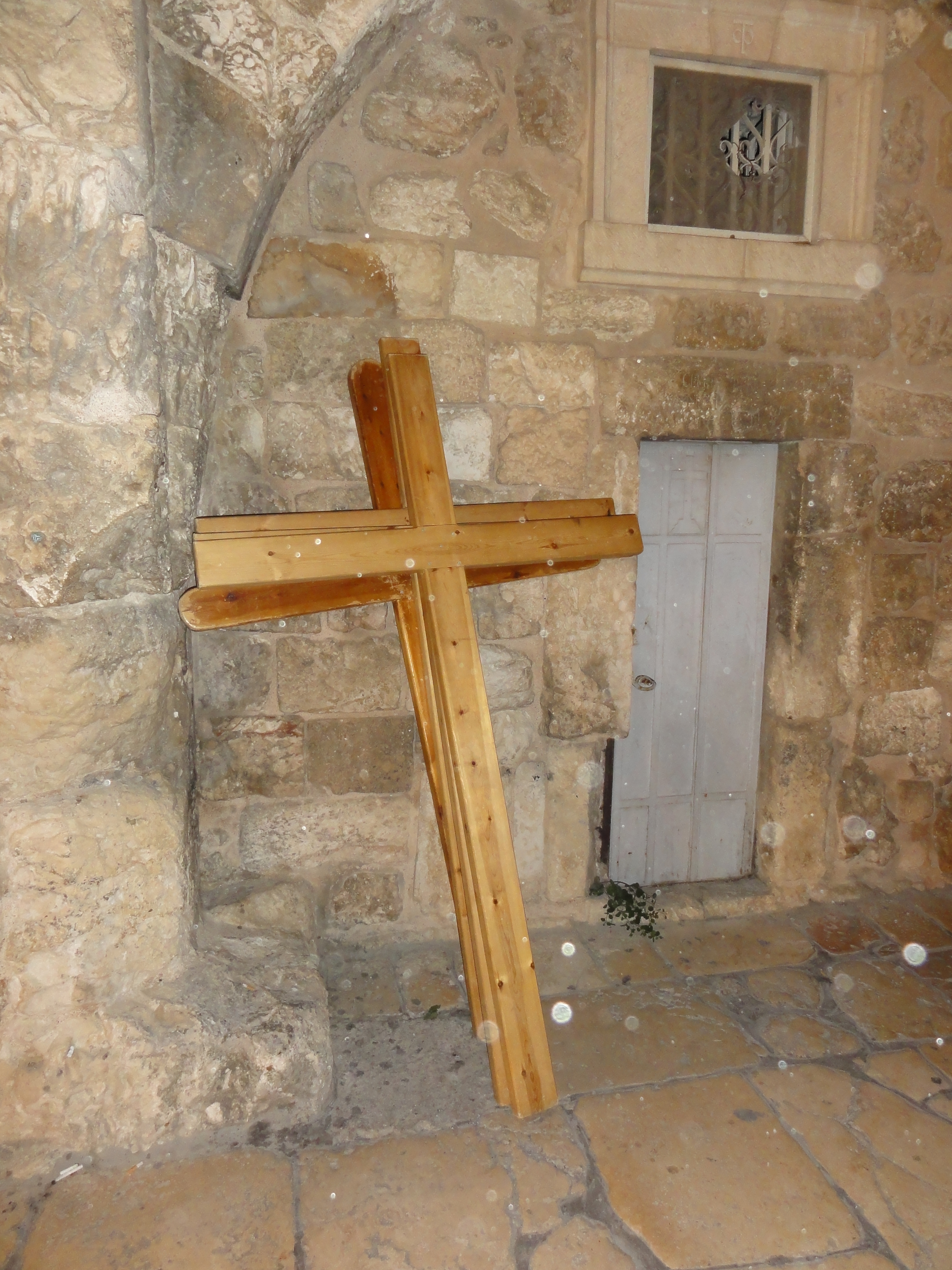
10th Station – Jesus is stripped of his garments

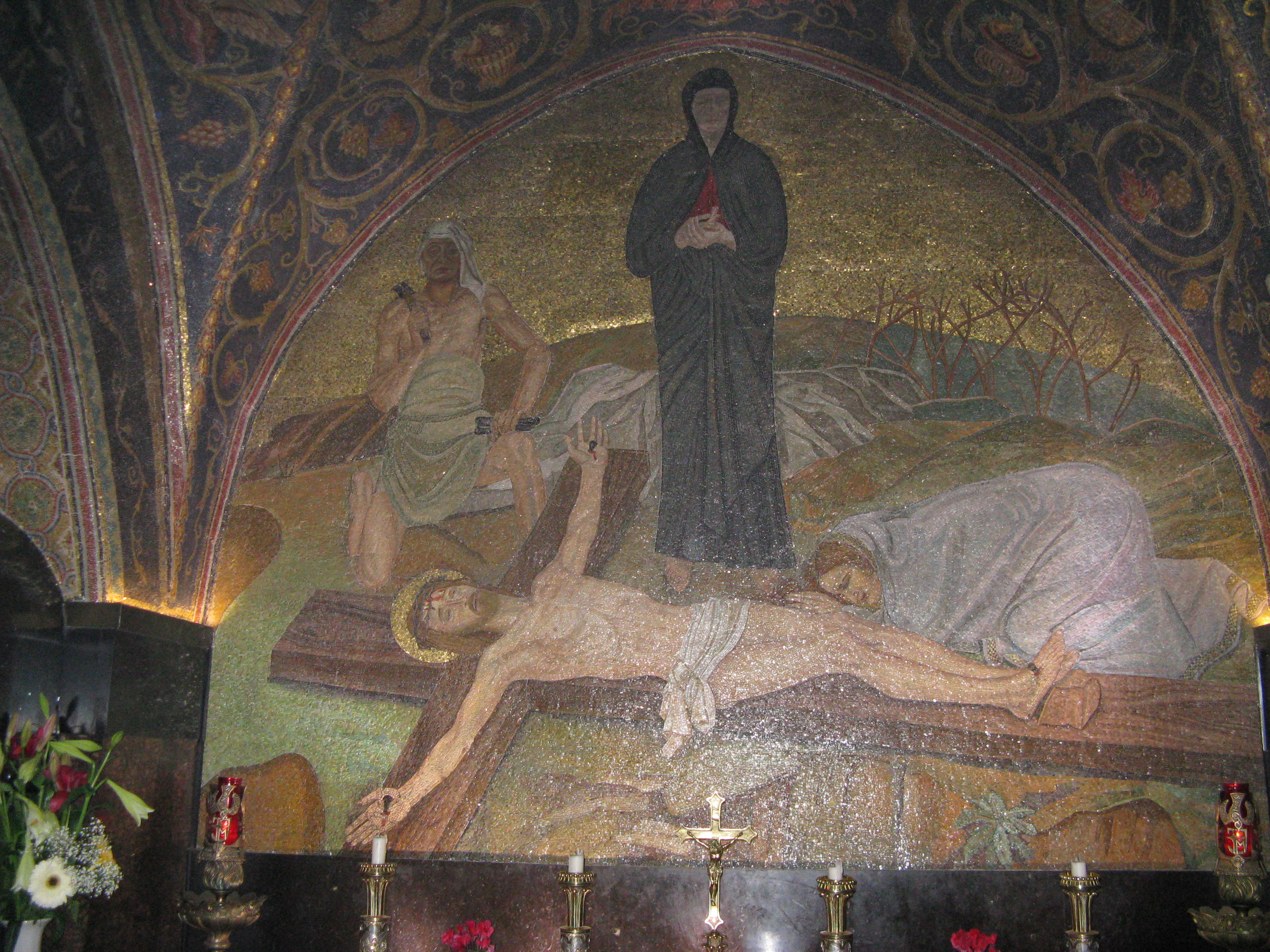
11th Station – Crucifixion: Jesus is nailed to the cross

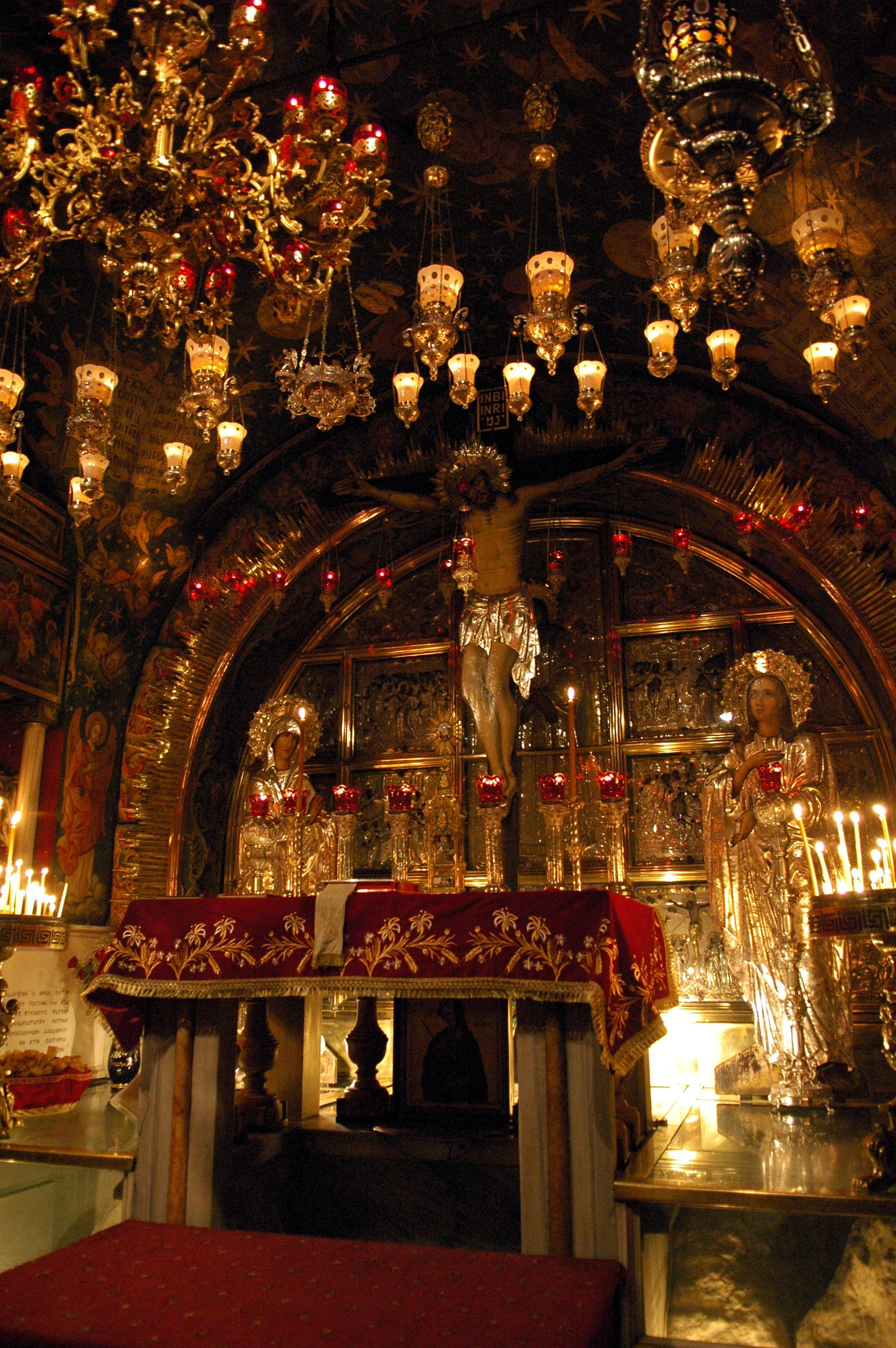
12th Station – Jesus dies on the cross

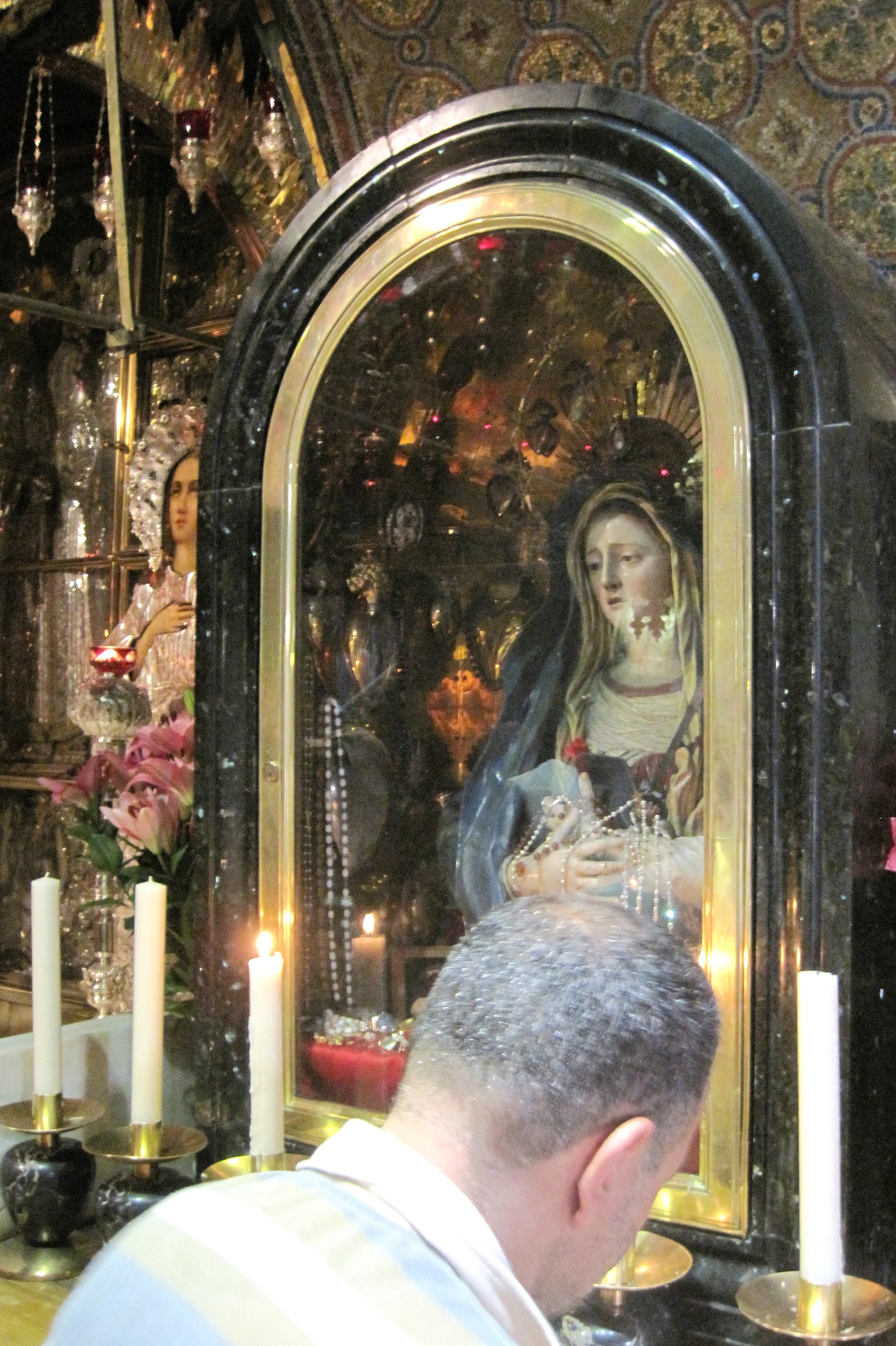
13th Station – Catholic bust of Our Lady of Sorrows

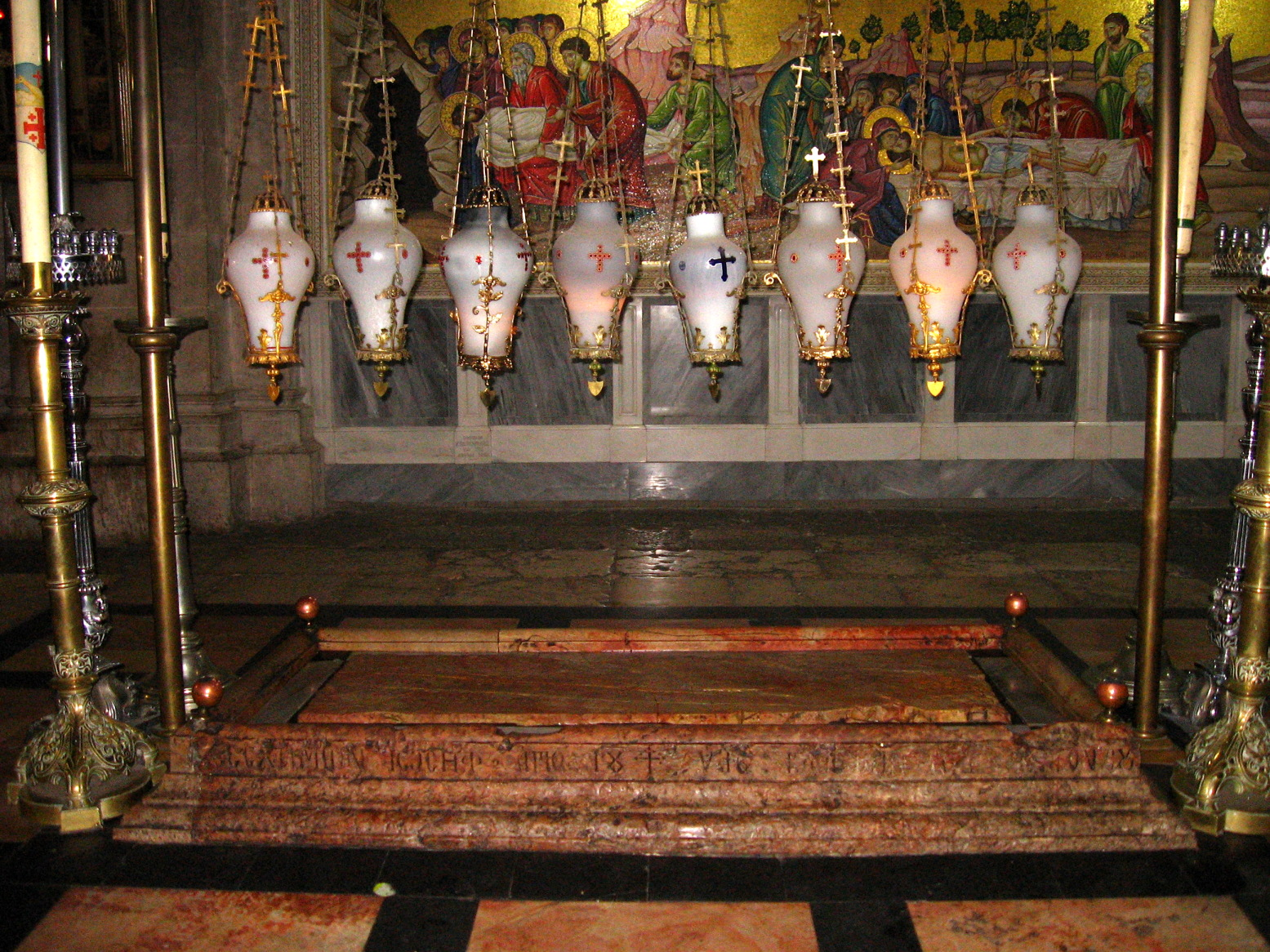
alternative 13th Station, Stone of the Anointing

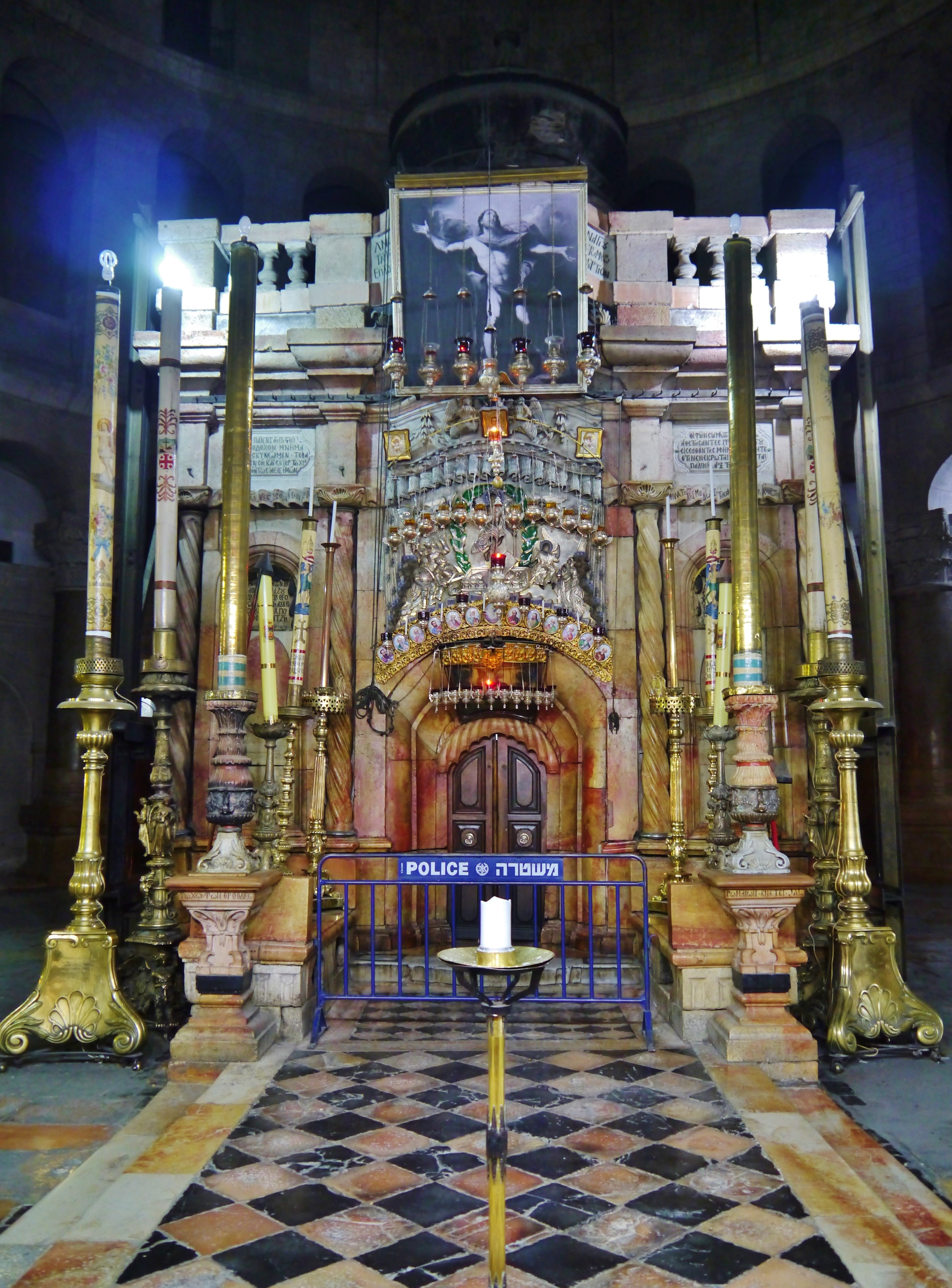
14th Station – Jesus is laid in the tomb

== See also ==
- Passion of Jesus

== Sources ==
- Thurston, Herbert (1914). The Stations of the Cross. London: Burns and Oates.
