= Struthion Pool =

1st-century BCE underground cistern in Jerusalem

- אשווח צפרא (Hebrew) (Jewish Palestinian Aramaic)
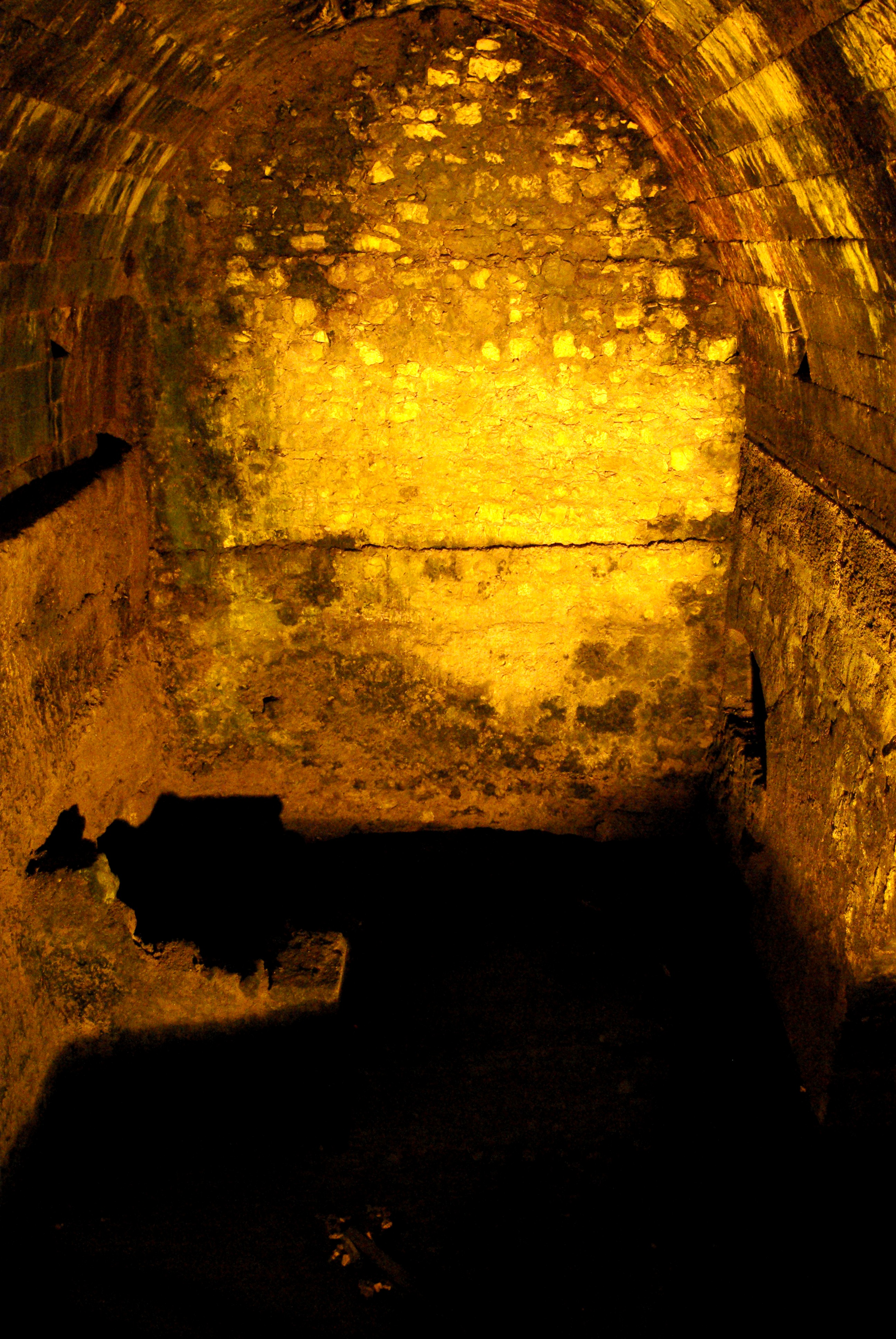
- One chamber of the pool

- Location within Old City of Jerusalem
- 31°46′49.083″N 35°14′1.102″E
- Location: Old City of Jerusalem

History
- Built: First century BCE
- Built by: Herod the Great

Site notes
- Material: Stone, mortar
- Condition: Preserved
- Management: Convent of the Sisters of Zion
- Public access: Restricted

The Struthion Pool, effectually translated from the Greek as 'Sparrow Pool' (Jewish Palestinian Aramaic: אשווח צפרא) is a large cuboid cistern beneath the Convent of the Sisters of Zion in the Old City of Jerusalem, built by Herod the Great in the first century BCE.

== Construction ==
=== Hellenistic precursor and Herodian pool ===
Lying at the foot of the rock scarp that once bore the Antonia Fortress, the pool is located at the northwestern corner of Jerusalem's Temple Mount. Measuring 52 by 14 metres, the pool is oriented from northwest to southeast, with its depth increasing from 4.5 metres in the north to 6 metres in the south. The pool's long eastern and western walls are not horizontal but also drop steadily to the south. Once open-aired, the pool was accessible along both long walls by a series of rock-cut steps covered by waterproof mortar composed of chalk and ashes.

The pool was apparently built by Herod the Great during his construction of the Antonia and the renovation of the Temple Mount in the late first century BCE. The only pool known to stand in close association with the site of the Antonia, there is little doubt that it was constructed no later than the fashioning of the rock scarp above it, as the orientation of the pool conditioned a slight directional change in the rock podium's northeastern corner. It is therefore identified with the Struthius or Struthion ('sparrow') pool mentioned by Josephus in his description of Titus' siege of the Antonia during the Great Revolt (70 CE):

For there were now four great banks raised, one of which was at the tower Antonia; this was raised by the fifth legion, over against the middle of that pool which was called Struthius

— Josephus, The Jewish War V. 467

The discovery of Seleucid and Hasmonean coins in the debris of the pool, as well as the similarity between local mortar and mortar used in other Hasmonean cisterns and baths in Jerusalem, may suggest a pre-Herodian origin to the pool. The Struthion is also accessible by a rock-cut passage that leads south for 34 meters before reaching the western wall of the Temple Mount enclosure. Blocked by the Herodian construction, this was an earlier aqueduct that once fed one of the cisterns underneath the Temple Mount enclosure itself. The aqueduct has been attributed to the Hasmoneans, though an earlier Ptolemaic association cannot be ruled out. With a floor 3 meters above the top of the pool, this passage would have remained dry at the time the pool was in use and may have been used as a secret means of access to the pool from the fortress or Temple Mount. Another passage exists north of the pool, though its relation to the pool or the southern passage is unknown.

=== Late Roman vaults and pavement ===
Once open-aired, the pool was later covered by two longitudinal barrel vaults that spring from the side walls and connect on a wall running along the center of the pool pierced by a series of arches. This division is the source of another name given to the Struthion, the Twin Pools. The two vaults were built to support a large flagstone pavement that covered the area above the pool. This pavement features shallow channels that carried runoff water into the pool as well as masonry manholes.

Opinions differ as to the dating and origin of the pavement. Originally thought to be contemporary with the construction of the pool and thus to belong to the Antonia Fortress, reexamination of archaeological data by Father Pierre Benoit has prompted a revision of its dating. The vaults and pavement are rather thought to be contemporary with the nearby Ecce homo arch, originally a triumphal arch constructed by Emperor Hadrian, and thus assigned to the 2nd century CE. This reasoning seems to be supported by Josephus' account of the siege of the Antonia, although whether Josephus had meant a ramp had been built in, over or opposite the middle of the pool remains unclear.

== Discovery and excavations ==
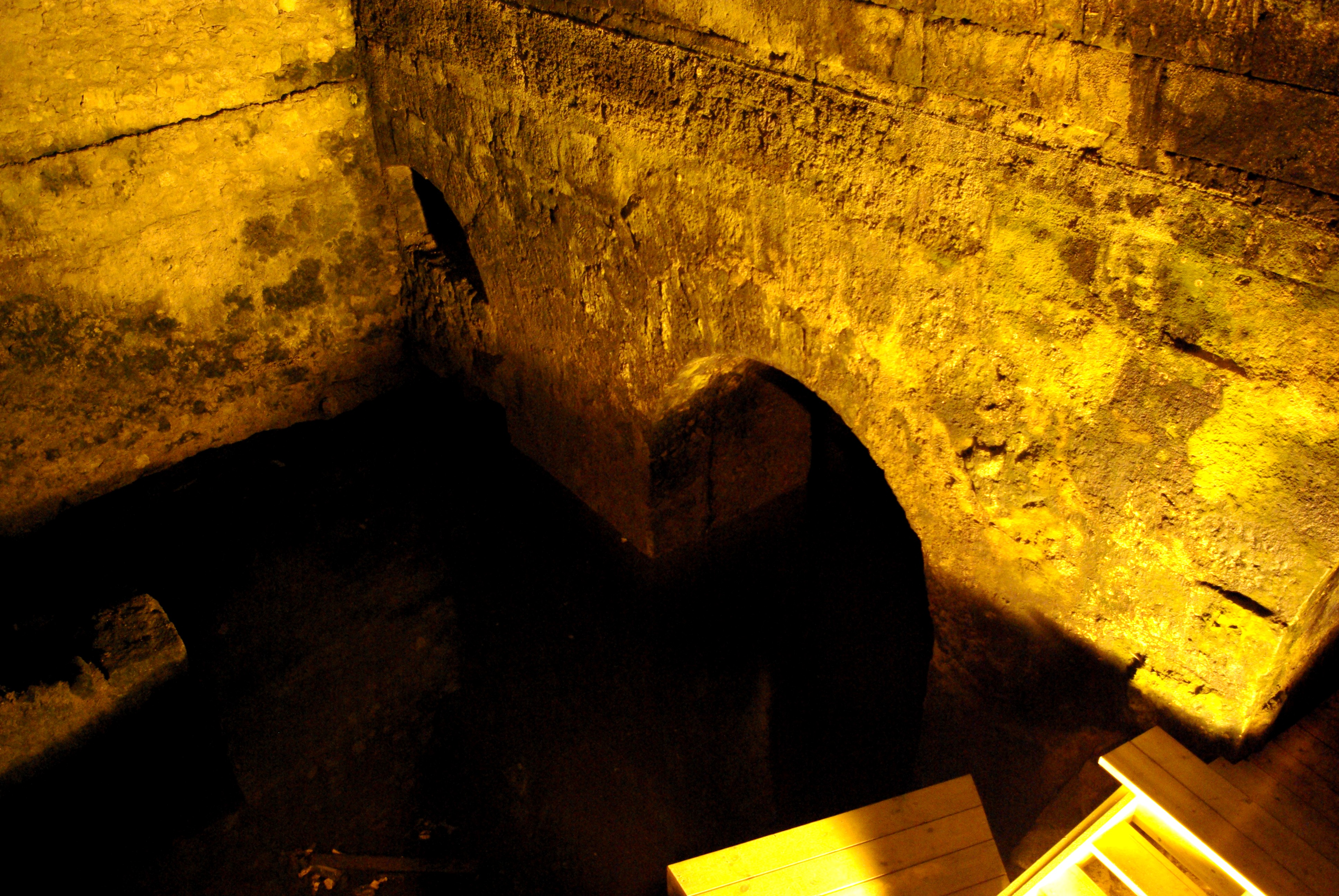
View of an arch connecting the two chambers of the pool

The pool had remained in use down to modern times, and was identified as the Struthion by British engineer Sir Charles Warren during his exploration of Jerusalem between 1867 and 1870. His discovery of a tunnel running along the Western Wall to the vicinity of the pool prompted the Convent of the Sisters of Zion to seal off a part of the pool. An east-west wall now divides the Struthion pool into two parts, preventing access between them; one side is visible from the Western Wall tunnels, the other area is accessible from the Convent.

As a result of 1971 extensions to the original Western Wall Tunnel, the Hasmonean water system became linked to the end of the Western Wall Tunnel. Running under Arab housing, the two were later opened as a tourist attraction. The attraction has a linear route, starting at the Western Wall Plaza, passing through the modern tunnels, then the ancient water system, and ending at the Struthion Pool. As the Sisters of Zion were not willing to allow tourists to exit into the Convent via the pool, tourists had to return through the narrow tunnels to their starting point, creating logistical issues. Digging an alternative exit from the tunnel was proposed, but initially rejected on the grounds that any exit would be seen as an attempt by the Jewish authorities to stake a claim to ownership of the nearby land—part of the Muslim Quarter of the city.

In 1996 Benjamin Netanyahu authorized the opening of an exit into the Via Dolorosa, underneath the Ummariya madrasah. Over the subsequent few weeks, 80 people were killed as a result of riots against the creation of the exit.

== See also ==
- Church of Ecce Homo
- Hasmonean Baris
- Ptolemaic Baris
- Siege of Jerusalem (70 CE)
