= Jerusalem during the Byzantine period =

Period of the history of Jerusalem

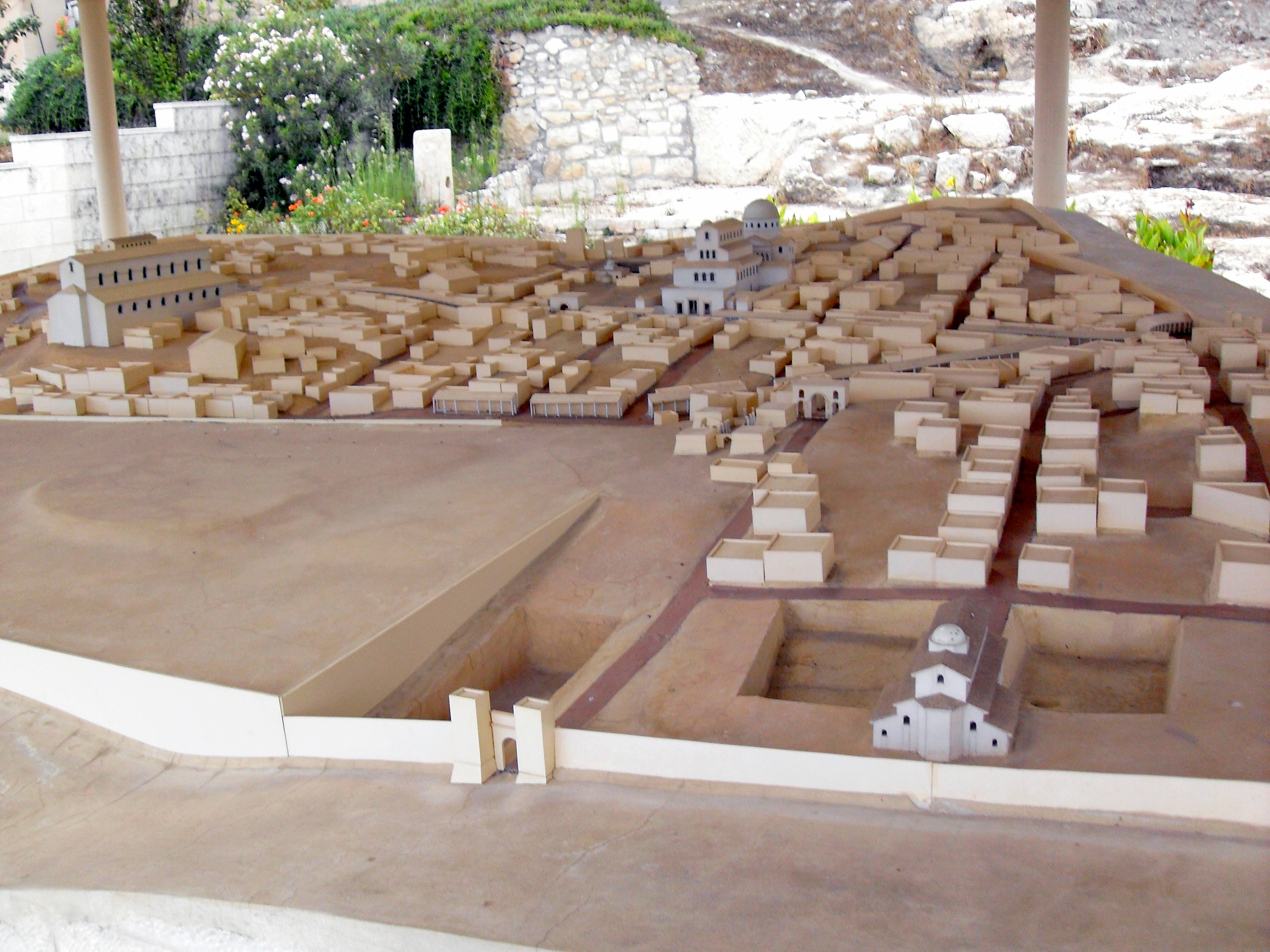
Jerusalem Saint Peter in Gallicantu model of the Byzantine city

During the Byzantine period, in the years between Constantine the Great's rise to power (324 AD) and its conquest by the Rashidun Caliphate in 637, Jerusalem was under the control of the Byzantine Empire. The essential change in the character and status of the city, compared to the classical Roman period, was its transformation from a pagan city to a Christian city. The Byzantine rule developed the Roman colony Aelia Capitolina in Jerusalem, turning it into a central Christian city from a religious and administrative point of view (with the administration subject to the institutional-religious hierarchy) and a world center for pilgrimage. At the end of the period, between the years 614–628, Jerusalem was conquered by the Sasanian Empire, but was later recaptured by Byzantine Christians in 629 CE. Jerusalem was captured by the Rashidun Caliphate in 637 CE as part of the Siege of Jerusalem (636–637).

== The Temple Mount in the Byzantine period ==
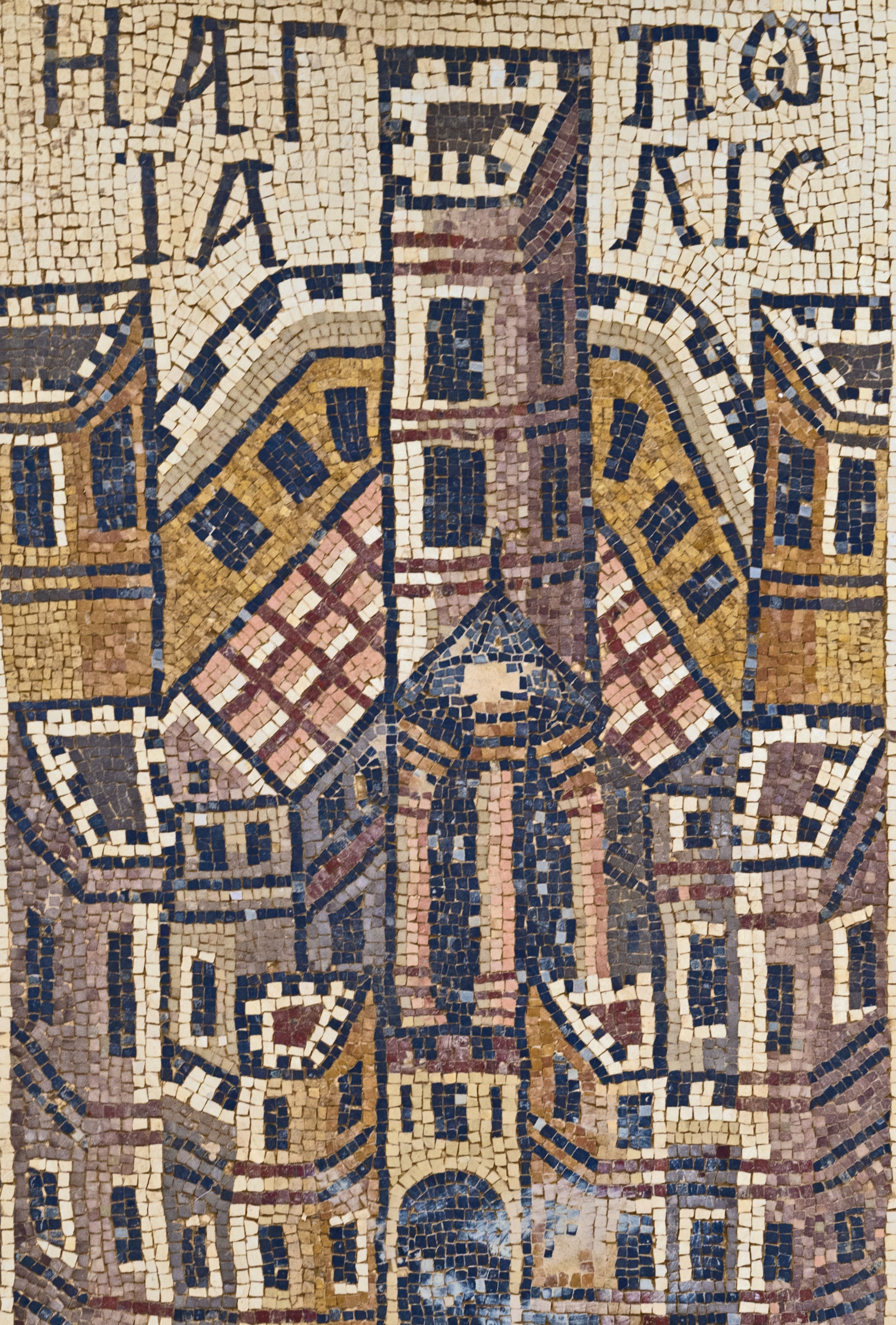
Depiction of Jerusalem in the Byzantine Umm ar-Rasas mosaics, identified as Hagia Polis in Greek, the Holy City, during the time of the Abbasid Caliphate in 785.

Depiction of Jerusalem in the Byzantine Umm ar-Rasas mosaics, identified as Hagia Polis in Greek, the Holy City, during the time of the Abbasid Caliphate in 785.

As part of the Temple Mount Sifting Project, rich findings from the Byzantine period were discovered, including mosaic pieces, ceramics, coins and the remains of large buildings, leading the team to believe there was very likely a Byzantine church built there in antiquity. The Bordeaux Pilgrim reports in 333 about the statues of the emperor Hadrian on the Temple Mount, but it is likely that the idolatrous statues were soon removed. On the Madaba map, the Temple Mount does not appear at all, and since the size of the elements on the map expresses their importance, its absence expresses its lack of importance. Some scholars believe the Temple Mount and its surroundings were even used as a municipal dump. In 361, the emperor Julian came to power, who wanted to renew the face of the empire and retreat from Christianity back to paganism. As part of his Anti-Christian worldview, he also proposed to rebuild the Jewish Temple. The cornerstone of Julian's temple was laid in May 363, but construction stopped about a month later. After the death of Julian, his successor Jovian returned the empire to Christianity.

== Jews in Byzantine Jerusalem ==
In 329 AD, Constantine the Great issued laws prohibiting Jews to own Christian slaves, prohibited mixed marriages and punished by death conversion of Christians to Judaism. Jews did not belong to the Eastern Orthodox faith, which was the state church of the Byzantine Empire. Jews were subject to heavy restrictions when approaching Jerusalem, which led to a distancing from the traditions connected with the Mount of Olives. Jews could still practice faith under the rule of the Byzantines, as long as they paid the Fiscus Judaicus. During the Byzantine–Sasanian War of 602–628 many Jews sided against the Byzantine Empire in the Jewish revolt against Heraclius, which successfully assisted the invading Persian Sassanids in conquering all of Roman Egypt and Syria.

== Structure of the city ==
Researchers agree that the Byzantine Jerusalem was based on the Roman city of Aelia Capitolina, characterized by two north–south streets: the Cardo, extending south from the Damascus Gate along the Tyropoeon Valley. The religious center of the city was the Church of the Holy Sepulchre. Its proximity to the Cardo has turned the area into a bustling center of activity throughout the year in general, and on the many holidays in particular. An important urban focal point between the Church of the Holy Sepulchre was Hezekiah's Pool and the Church of Saint John the Baptist.
