= Helena, mother of Constantine I =

Roman empress and saint (c. 246–c. 330)

Helena
- Augusta
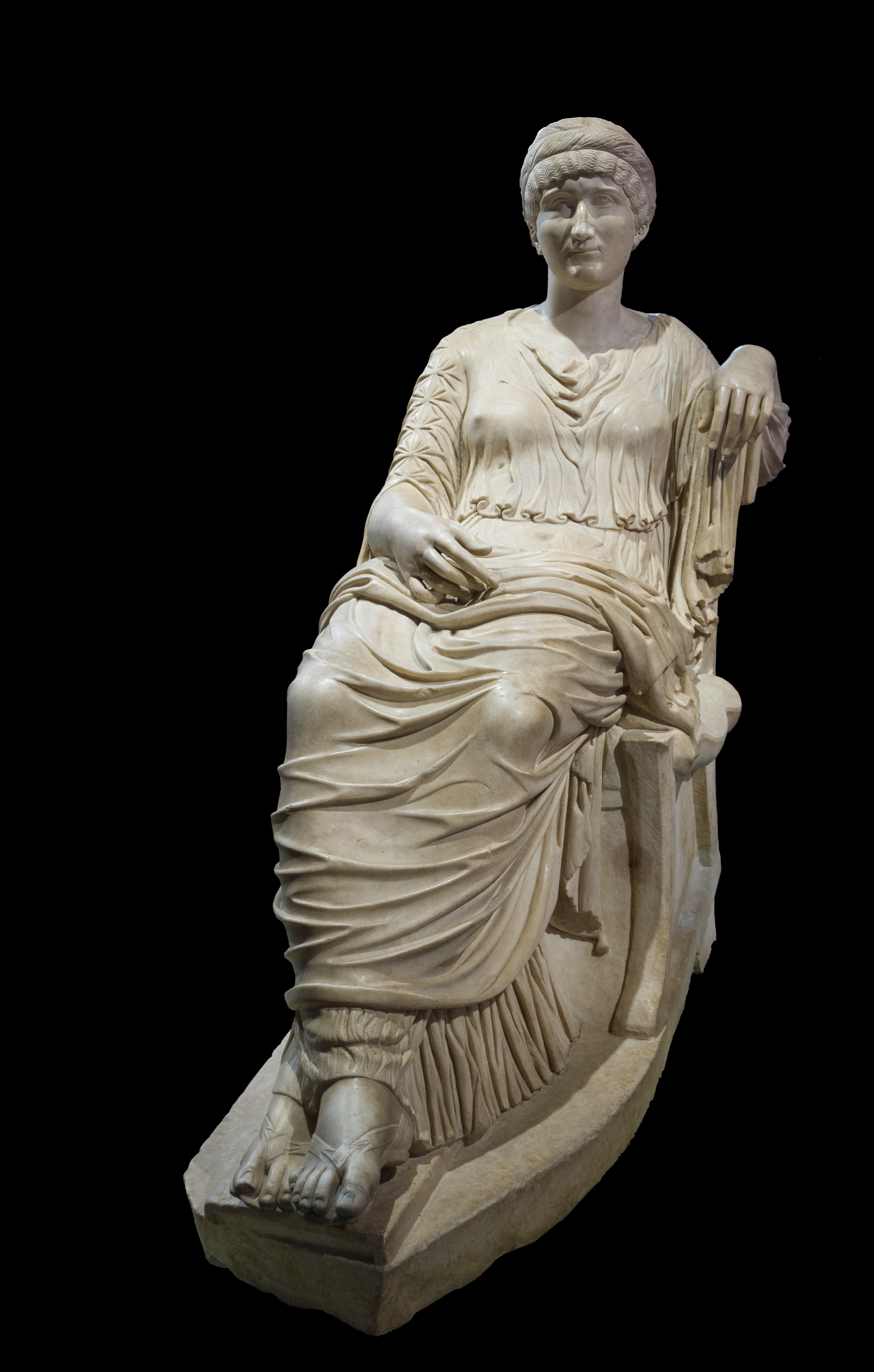
- Statue of Helena in the Musei Capitolini, Rome

Roman empress
- Tenure: c. 324–330
- Born: c. AD 246–248; Drepanon (later Helenopolis), Bithynia, in Asia Minor
- Died: AD 330 (aged 82–84); Rome, Tuscania et Umbria
- Burial: Mausoleum of Helena
- Spouse: Constantius Chlorus
- Issue: Constantine I
Names
- Flavia Julia Helena
Regnal name
- Flavia Julia Helena Augusta
- Dynasty: Constantinian
- Religion: Nicene Christianity

Flavia Julia Helena (Note: Her full name is not attested until 324, when she received the honorific Augusta. Her birth name was probably just "Helena".) (/ˈhɛlənə/; Ancient Greek: Ἑλένη, Helénē; c. AD 246/248 – 330), also known as Helena of Constantinople and in Christianity as Saint Helena, (Note: Spelling variations include Saint Helen and Saint Helene.) was an Augusta of the Roman Empire and mother of Emperor Constantine the Great as well as a canonized saint in both Catholic and Orthodox Churches for her pivotal role in the spread of Christianity. She was born in the lower classes traditionally in the city of Drepanon, Bithynia, in Asia Minor, which was renamed Helenopolis.

Helena ranks as an important figure in the history of Christianity. In her final years, she made a religious tour of Syria Palaestina and Jerusalem, during which ancient tradition claims that she discovered the True Cross. The Eastern Orthodox Church, Catholic Church, Oriental Orthodox Churches, Anglican Communion, and the Lutheran Church revere her as a saint.

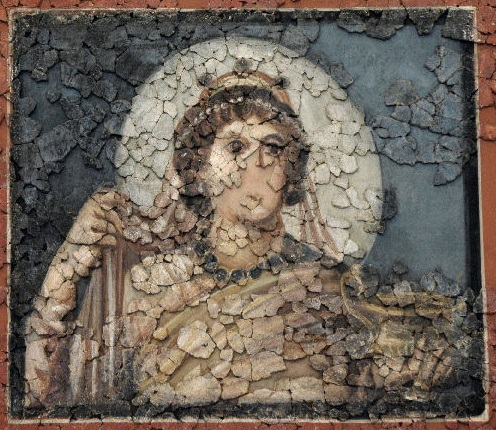
A fresco from Trier, Germany, possibly depicting Helena, c. 310

== Early life ==
Though Helena's birthplace is not known with certainty, Drepanon (later named Helenopolis after her) in the province of Bithynia, Asia Minor, is the candidate supported by most secondary sources (namely 6th-century Byzantine historian Procopius), and by far the most likely candidate for her place of origin. If so, it would make her a Greek speaker or possibly bilingual. Her name is attested on coins as Flavia Helena, Flavia Julia Helena and sometimes Aelena. (Note: It has been speculated that the name "Aelena" is the result of poor minting, with H turning into A. Nonetheless the 5th-century Latin text Acta Cyriaci (based on an earlier Greek text) also refers to her as Aelena.) Joseph Vogt suggested that the name Helena was typical for the Greek-speaking part of the Roman Empire and that therefore her place of origin should be looked for in the eastern provinces of the Roman Empire. No Greek inscriptions have been attested dedicated to Helena during her lifetime, which may be because her fame was not as great in the Greek East as in the Latin West where she resided as empress.

Procopius is the earliest authority for the statement that Helena was a native of Drepanon, although his description may have been only intended as an etymological explanation about the toponym Helenopolis. The name Helena appears in all areas of the Empire and was common in Latin-speaking areas, but is not epigraphically attested in inscriptions of Bithynia. Some interpret her son Constantine's renaming of the city to Helenopolis after her death around AD 330 as evidence that the city was her birthplace. Historian Julia Hillner argues that the fact that Constantine's nephew, Emperor Julian, granted city status to a nearby village in Bithynia and named it Basilinopolis in honor of his own mother, Basilina, who was undoubtedly from Bithynia, provides solid evidence that the renaming to Helenopolis marked Helena's birthplace. (Note: Hillner argued that: "Julian was famously disgruntled with Constantine and Helena on account of Helena's grandsons' complicity in the murder of his father and generally keen on stressing his own lineage. He must in this way have been seeking to allow his mother's birthplace, now Basilinopolis, to rival nearby Helenopolis.") However, Constantine named two other locations after Helena: Helenopolis in Palestine, apparently due to Helena's renowned pilgrimage to the Holy Land, and the province of Helenopontus in the Pontus, which was in the same region as Drepanon, but further to the east. (Note: Two other locations were named after Helena: a vicus Helena in northern France, and an oppidum Helena in the Pyrenees, which took its name due to Emperor Constans, a grandson of Helena, being murdered there, and corresponded with a prophecy which predicted that Constans would die in the arms of his grandmother.) Historian Cyril Mango argues that Helenopolis was refounded to strengthen the communication network around Constantine's new capital in Constantinople, and was renamed simply to honor Helena, not necessarily to mark her birthplace. Other suggestions about her birthplace, without strong documentation, are Naissus (central Balkans), Caphar or Edessa (Mesopotamia), and Trier.

The bishop and historian Eusebius of Caesarea states that Helena was about 80 on her return from Palestine. Since that journey has been dated to 326–28, she was probably born around 246 to 249. Information about her social background universally suggests that she came from the lower classes. Fourth-century sources, following Eutropius' Breviarium, record that she came from a humble background. Bishop Ambrose of Milan, writing in the late 4th century was the first to call her a stabularia, a term translated as "stable-maid" or "inn-keeper". He makes this comment a virtue, calling Helena a bona stabularia, a "good stable-maid", probably to contrast her with the general suggestion of sexual laxness considered typical of that group. Other sources, especially those written after Constantine's proclamation as emperor, gloss over or ignore her background. Some ancient historians, "pagan and therefore hostile to the family ... suggested that as a girl she had been one of the supplementary amenities of her father's establishment, regularly available to his clients at a small extra charge."

Both Geoffrey of Monmouth and Henry of Huntingdon promoted a popular tradition that Helena was a British princess and the daughter of "Old King Cole" from the area of Colchester. This led to the later dedication of 135 churches in England to her, many in and around the area of Yorkshire, and revived as a suggestion in the 20th century in the novel by Evelyn Waugh.

== Marriage to Constantius ==
It is unknown where she first met Constantius. The historian Timothy Barnes has suggested that Constantius, while serving under Emperor Aurelian, could have met her while stationed in Asia Minor for the campaign against Zenobia. A legend has it that upon meeting they were wearing identical silver bracelets. Barnes calls attention to an epitaph at Nicomedia of one of Aurelian's protectors, which could indicate the emperor's presence in the Bithynian region soon after AD 270. The precise legal nature of the relationship between Helena and Constantius is also unknown. The sources are equivocal on the point, sometimes calling Helena Constantius' "wife", and sometimes, following the dismissive propaganda of Constantine's rival Maxentius, calling her his "concubine". Jerome, perhaps confused by the vague terminology of his own sources, manages to do both.

Some scholars, such as the historian Jan Drijvers, assert that Constantius and Helena were joined in a common-law marriage, a cohabitation recognized in fact but not in law. Others, like Timothy Barnes, assert that Constantius and Helena were joined in an official marriage, on the grounds that the sources claiming an official marriage are more reliable.

Helena gave birth to the future emperor Constantine I on 27 February of an uncertain year soon after 270 (probably around 272). At the time, she was in Naissus (Niš, Serbia). In order to obtain a wife more consonant with his rising status, Constantius divorced Helena some time before 289, when he married Theodora, Maximian's daughter under his command. The narrative sources date the marriage to 293, when Constantius was appointed caesar (heir-apparent) of Maximian, but the Latin panegyric of 289 refers to the new couple as already married. Helena and her son were dispatched to the court of Diocletian at Nicomedia, where Constantine grew to be a member of the inner circle. Helena never remarried and lived for a time in obscurity, though close to her only son, who had a deep regard and affection for her.

== After Constantine's ascension to the throne ==
Constantine was proclaimed augustus (emperor) in 306 by Constantius' troops after the latter had died, and following his elevation his mother was brought back to the public life in 312, returning to the imperial court. She appears in the Eagle Cameo portraying Constantine's family, probably commemorating the birth of Constantine's son Constantine II in the summer of 316. (Note: The cameo was incorporated in the rich binding of the Ada Gospels; the year 316 is argued in Stephenson 2010:126f.)

She lived in the Horti Spei Veteris in Rome which she converted into an even more luxurious palace.

According to Eusebius, Helena was converted to Christianity by Constantine.

She was first given the title of nobilissima femina. He later appointed her as Augusta in 324, following the defeat of his rival Licinius. According to Eusebius, he gave her unlimited access to the imperial treasury.

== Pilgrimage and relic discoveries ==
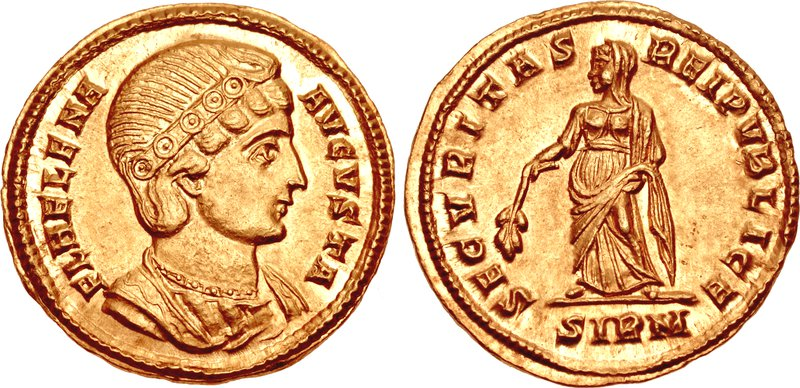
Coin of Helena as Augusta, minted in Sirmium in AD 324

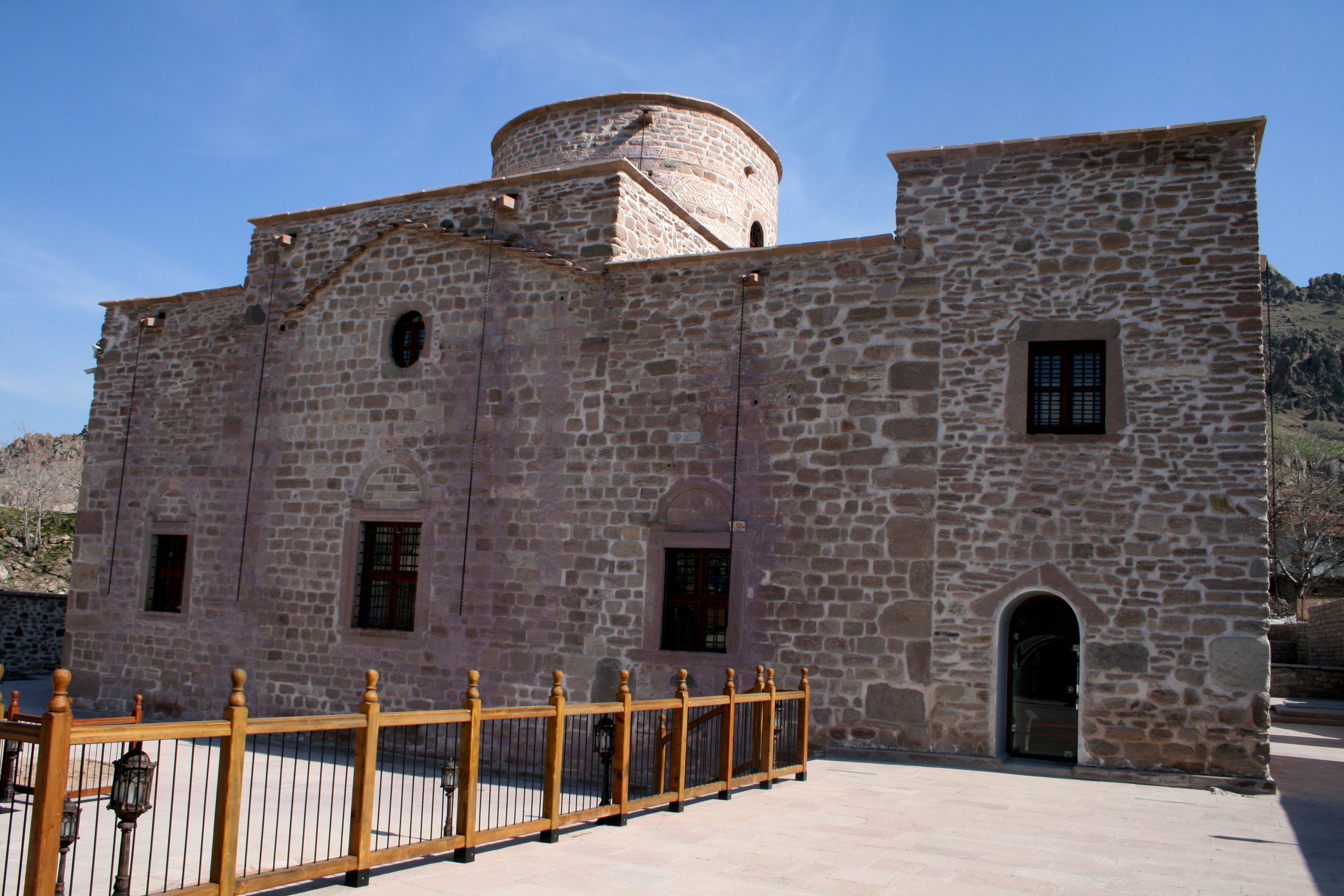
The church of the Archangel Michael founded by St. Helen in Sille, Konya, in Asia Minor in 327

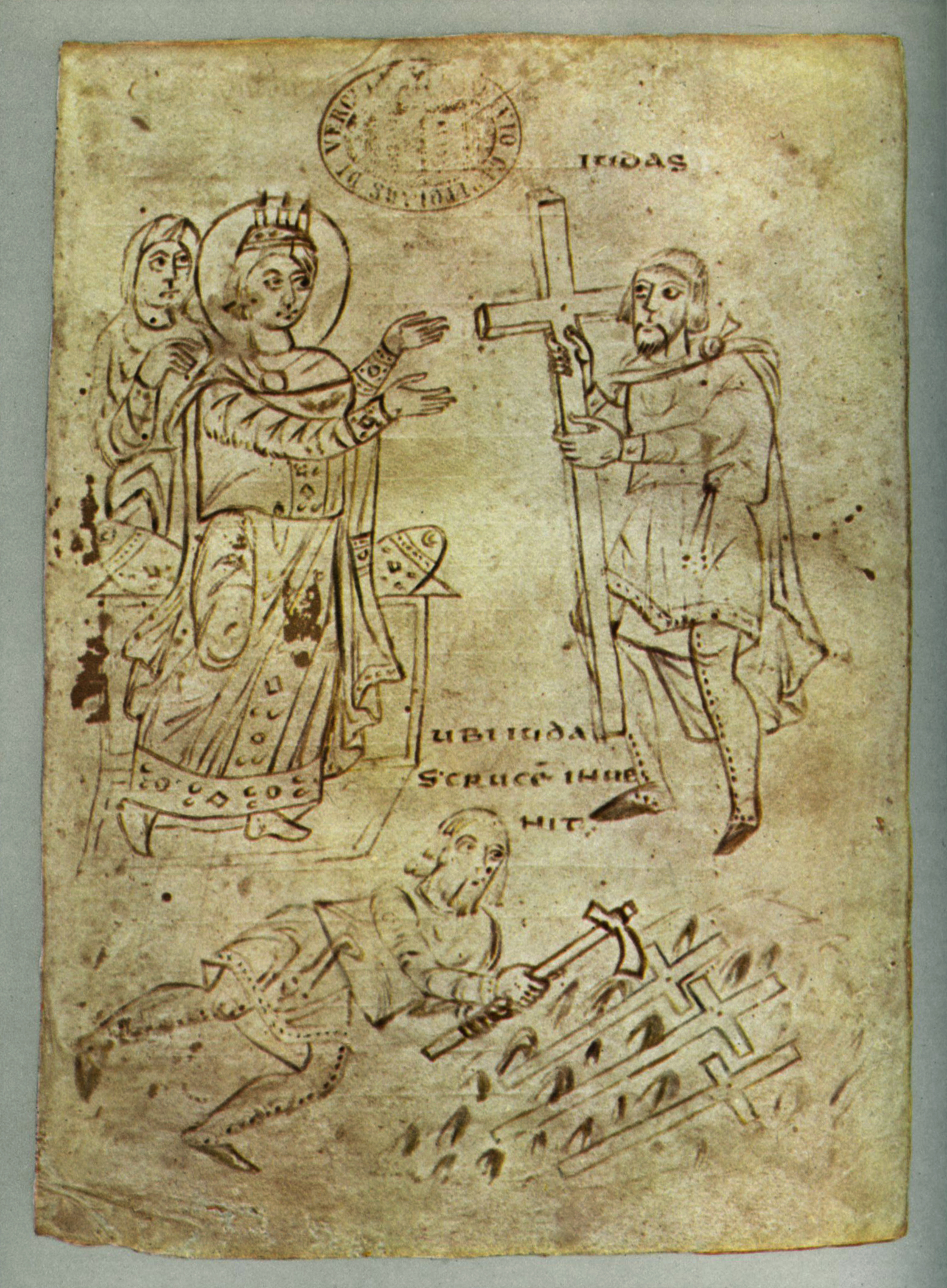
Helena finding the True Cross, Italian manuscript, c. 825

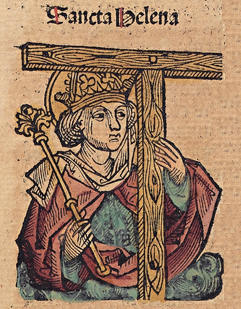
St Helena in the Nuremberg Chronicle, 1493

In AD 326–328 Helena undertook a trip to Palestine. According to Eusebius of Caesarea, who records the details of her pilgrimage to Palestine and other eastern provinces, and Socrates Scholasticus, she was responsible for the construction or beautification of the Church of the Nativity in Bethlehem, and the Church of Eleona on the Mount of Olives; sites of Christ's birth and ascension, respectively. Local founding legend attributes to Helena's orders the construction of a church in Egypt to identify the Burning Bush of Sinai. The chapel at Saint Catherine's Monastery—often referred to as the Chapel of Saint Helen—is dated to the year 330. However, a number of modern scholars believe this trip also had a political purpose, in addition to pilgrimage. Scholars believe that Eusebius' account led to later legends connecting her with the True Cross.

=== The True Cross and the Church of the Holy Sepulchre ===
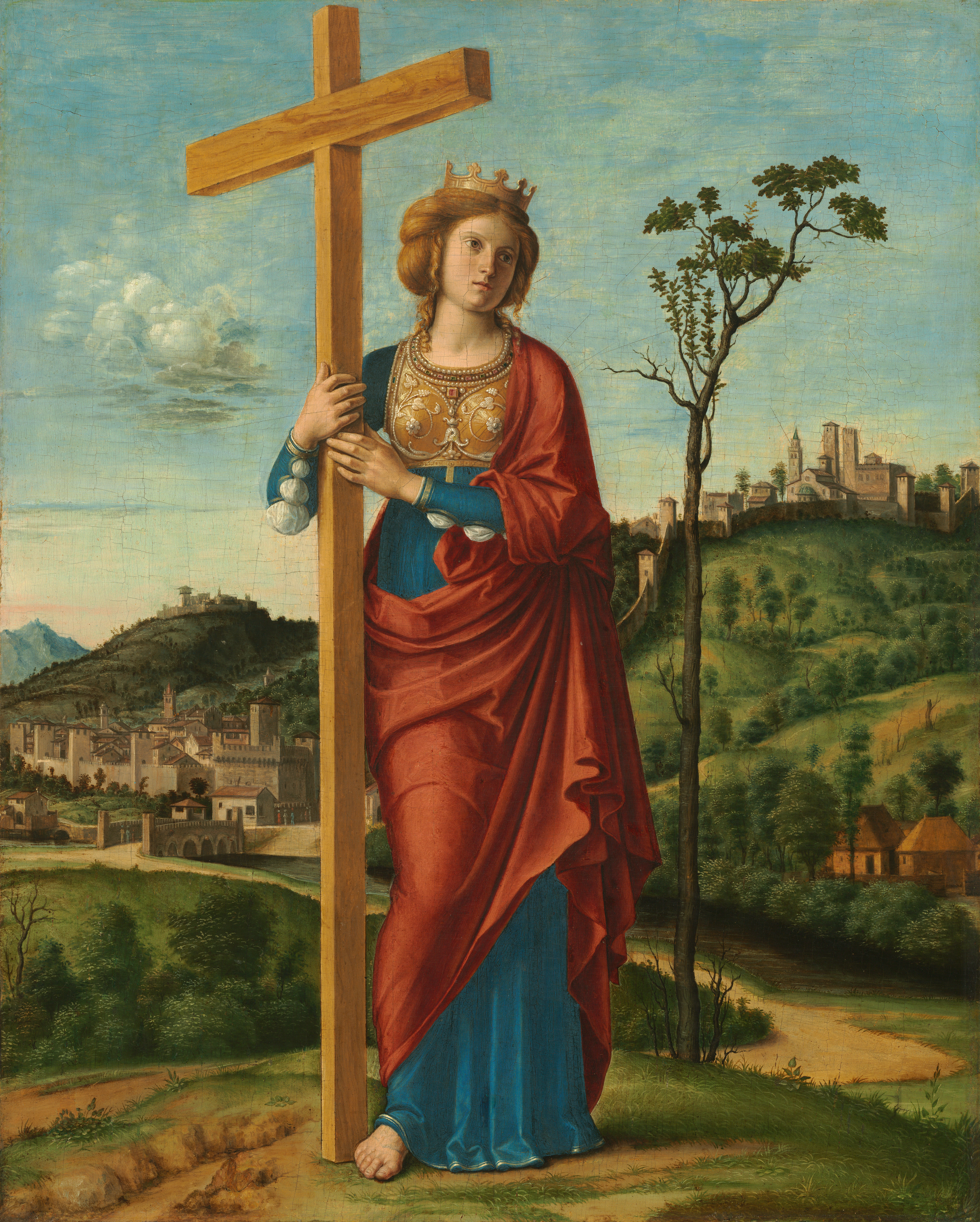
Helena of Constantinople by Cima da Conegliano, 1495 (National Gallery of Art, Washington, D.C.)

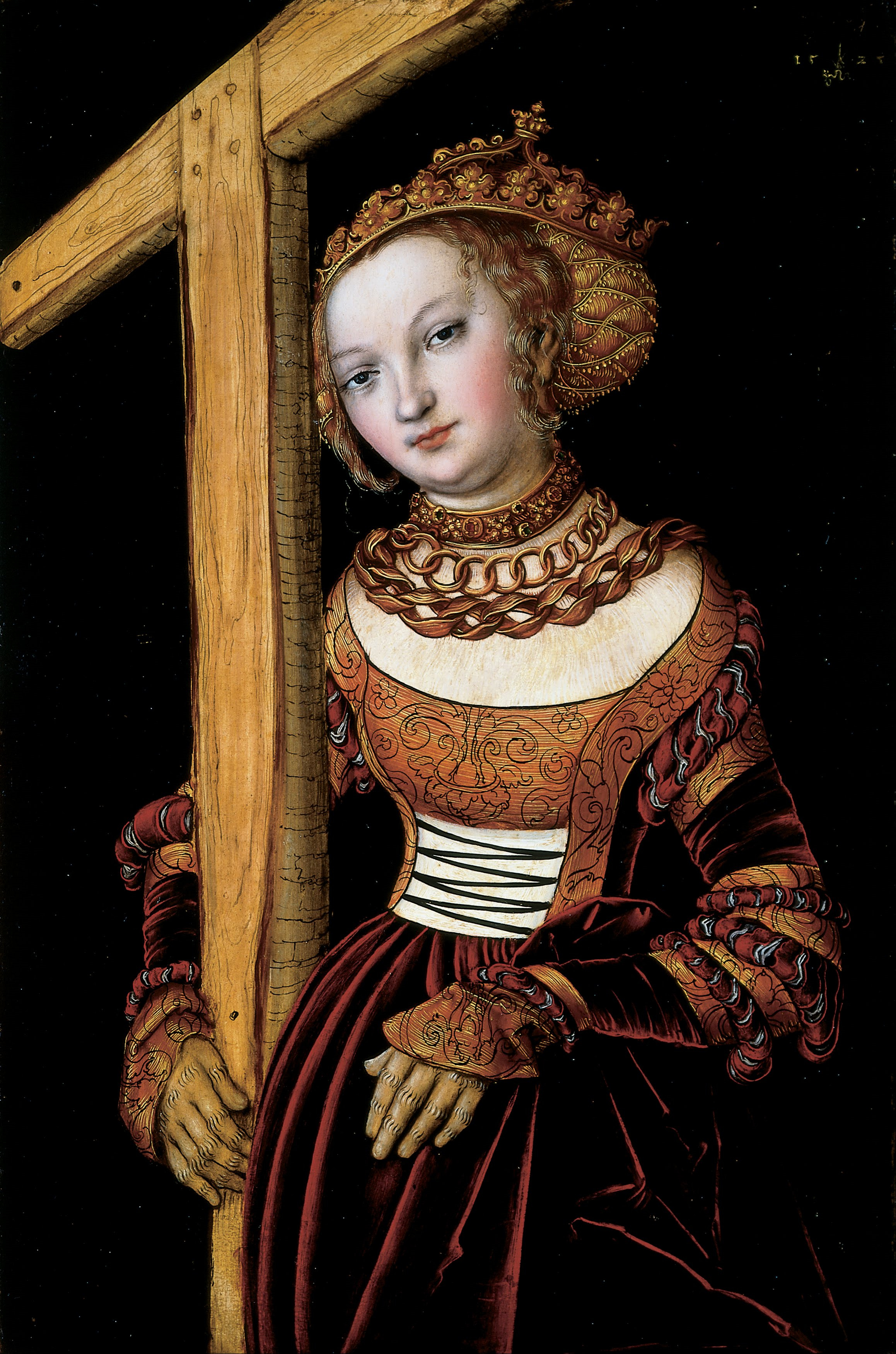
Saint Helena with the Cross, Lucas Cranach the Elder, 1525 (Cincinnati Art Museum)

She is most famous for the discovery of the True Cross, for which she was not responsible. Emperor Hadrian had built during the 130s a temple to Venus over the supposed site of Jesus' tomb near Calvary, and renamed the city Aelia Capitolina. Accounts differ concerning whether the temple was dedicated to Venus or Jupiter. According to Eusebius, Constantine destroyed the temple of Venus and discovered the burial site of Jesus in the spot. Later legends had Helena destroying the temple.

According to tradition, Helena ordered the temple torn down and, according to the legend that arose at the end of the 4th century, chose a site to begin excavating, which led to the recovery of three different crosses. The legend is recounted in Ambrose, On the Death of Theodosius (died 395) and at length in Rufinus' chapters appended to his translation into Latin of Eusebius's Ecclesiastical History, the main body of which does not mention the event. (Note: Noted in Stephenson 2010:253f, who observes "None of this is true", noting Rufinus' source in a lost work of Gelasius of Caesarea.) Then, Rufinus relates, the empress refused to be swayed by anything short of solid proof and performed a test. Possibly through Bishop Macarius of Jerusalem, she had a woman who was near death brought from the city. When the woman touched the first and second crosses, her condition did not change, but when she touched the third and final cross she suddenly recovered, (Note: There are actually several different accounts: Catholic Encyclopedia: Archæology of the Cross and Crucifix: "Following an inspiration from on high, Macarius caused the three crosses to be carried, one after the other, to the bedside of a worthy woman who was at the point of death. The touch of the other two was of no avail; but on touching that upon which Christ had died the woman got suddenly well again. From a letter of St. Paulinus to Severus inserted in the Breviary of Paris it would appear that St. Helena herself had sought by means of a miracle to discover which was the True Cross and that she caused a man already dead and buried to be carried to the spot, whereupon, by contact with the third cross, he came to life. From the 1955 Roman Catholic Marian Missal: St. Helen, the first Christian Empress, went to Jerusalem to try to find the True Cross. She found it in AD 320 on 14 September. In the eighth century, the feast of the Finding was transferred to 3 May and on 14 September was celebrated the "Exaltation of the Cross," the commemoration of a victory over the Persians by Heraclius, as a result of which the relic was returned to Jerusalem. From yet another tradition, related by St. Ambrose following Rufinus, it would seem that the titulus, or inscription, had remained fastened to the Cross."; see also Socrates' Church History at CCEL.org: Book I, Chapter XVII: The Emperor's Mother Helena having come to Jerusalem, searches for and finds the Cross of Christ, and builds a Church.) and Helena declared the cross with which the woman had been touched to be the True Cross.

On the site of discovery, Constantine ordered the building of the Church of the Holy Sepulchre. Churches were also built on other sites detected by Helena.

The "Letter From Constantine to Macarius of Jerusalem", as presented in Eusebius' Life of Constantine, states:

Such is our Saviour's grace, that no power of language seems adequate to describe the wondrous circumstance to which I am about to refer. For, that the monument of his [Christ's] most holy Passion, so long ago buried beneath the ground, should have remained unknown for so long a series of years, until its reappearance to his servants now set free through the removal of him who was the common enemy of all, is a fact which truly surpasses all admiration. I have no greater care than how I may best adorn with a splendid structure that sacred spot, which, under Divine direction, I have disencumbered as it were of the heavy weight of foul idol worship [the Roman temple]; a spot which has been accounted holy from the beginning in God's judgment, but which now appears holier still, since it has brought to light a clear assurance of our Saviour's passion.

Sozomen and Theodoret claim that Helena also found the nails of the crucifixion. To use their miraculous power to aid her son, Helena allegedly had one placed in Constantine's helmet, and another in the bridle of his horse. According to one tradition, Helena acquired the Holy Tunic on her trip to Jerusalem and sent it to Trier.

=== Cyprus ===
Several relics purportedly discovered by Helena are now in Cyprus, where she spent some time. Among them are items believed to be part of Jesus Christ's tunic, pieces of the holy cross, and pieces of the rope with which Jesus was tied on the Cross. The rope, considered to be the only relic of its kind, has been held at the Stavrovouni Monastery, which was also said to have been founded by Helena. According to tradition, Helena is responsible for the large population of cats in Cyprus. Local tradition holds that she imported hundreds of cats from Egypt or Palestine in the fourth century to rid a monastery of snakes. The monastery is today known as "St. Nicholas of the Cats" (Greek Άγιος Νικόλαος των Γατών) and is located near Limassol.

=== Rome ===
Helena left Jerusalem and the eastern provinces in 327 to return to Rome, her place of residence. Later legends depict her as bringing with her large parts of the True Cross and other relics, which were then stored in her palace's private chapel, now the Basilica of Santa Croce in Gerusalemme, where they can be still seen today. This has been maintained by Cistercian monks in the monastery which has been attached to the church for centuries.

== Death and burial ==
Helena died around 330, with her son at her side. She was buried in the Mausoleum of Helena, outside Rome on the Via Labicana. Her sarcophagus is on display in the Pio-Clementine Vatican Museum, next to the sarcophagus of her granddaughter Constantina (Saint Constance); however, in 1154 her remains were replaced in the sarcophagus with the remains of Pope Anastasius IV, and Helena's remains were moved to Santa Maria in Ara Coeli. Socrates of Constantinople, Nikephoros Kallistos Xanthopoulos and other historians claimed that Helena's body was removed from her sarcophagus two years after her death and transported to the Church of the Holy Apostles in Constantinople. Stephen of Novgorod describes the tomb of Constantine and Helen and its location as being east of the sanctuary.

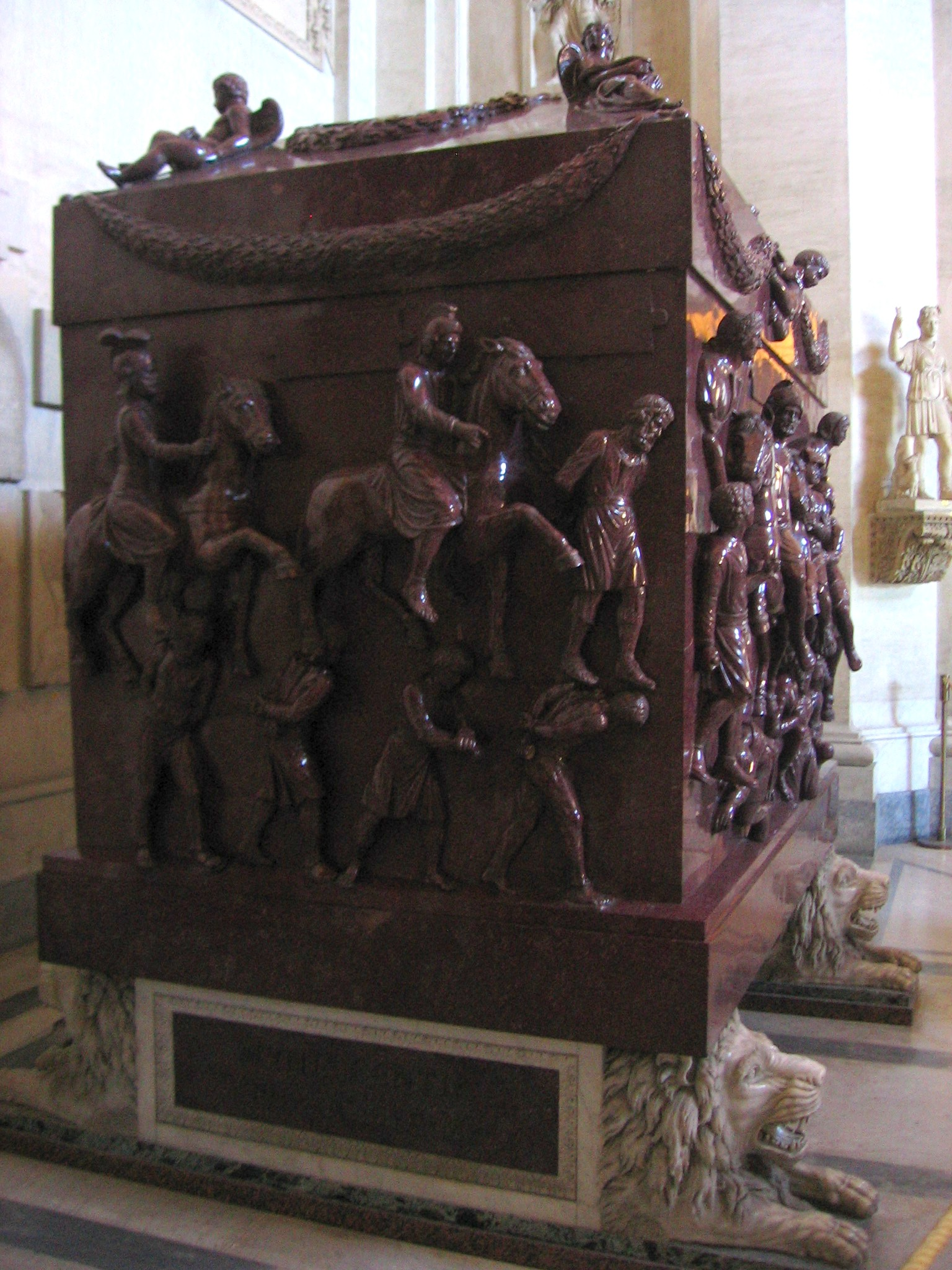
Helena's sarcophagus in the Museo Pio-Clementino, Vatican Museums, Rome

== Sainthood ==
Saint Helena of Constantinople
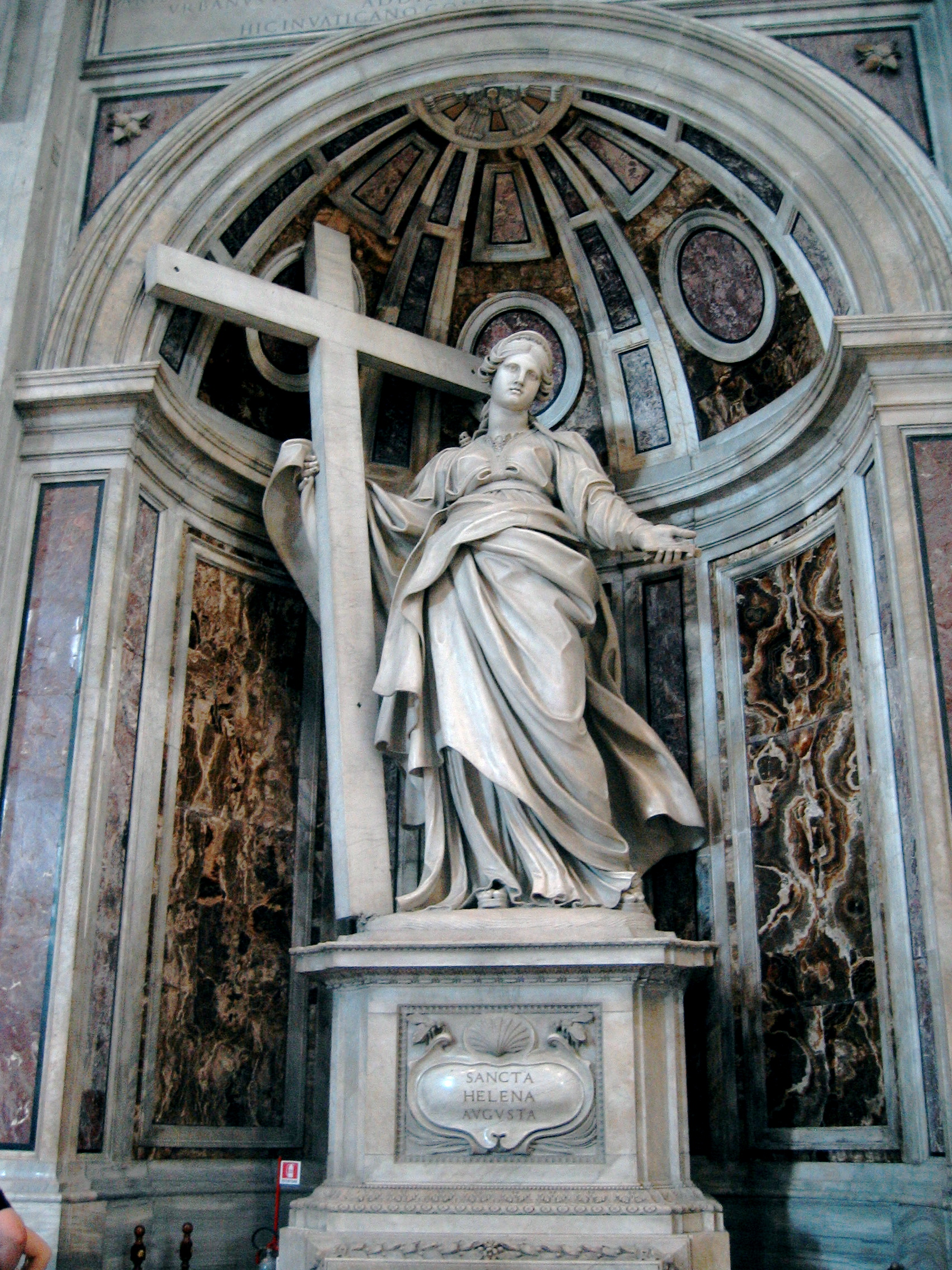
- Statue of Saint Helena in St. Peter's Basilica, Rome, Italy

Empress, Mother of Saint Constantine, Equal to the Apostles, Protector of the Holy Places
- Venerated in: Eastern Orthodoxy; Oriental Orthodoxy; Church of the East; Catholic Church; Lutheranism; Anglicanism
- Canonized: Pre-Congregation (Note: Her canonization pre-dates the practice of formal canonization by the Holy See and by the relevant Orthodox Churches."August 18 in German History". TGermanCulture.com.ua. Archived from the original on 17 March 2015. "Her designation as a saint precedes the practice of canonization by the Pope.")
- Major shrine: The shrine to Saint Helena in St. Peter's Basilica
- Feast: 21 May (Orthodox and most Lutheran and Anglican Churches); 18 August (Roman Rite); 19 May (some Lutheran Churches); 22 May (Episcopal Church); Tuesday after third Sunday of Pentecost (Armenian Apostolic Church); 9 Pashons (Coptic Orthodox Church)
- Attributes: crown, cross, nails
- Patronage: archaeologists, converts, difficult marriages, divorced people, empresses, new discoveries, Saint Helena Island, Noveleta, Cavite, Hagonoy, Bulacan, Colchester

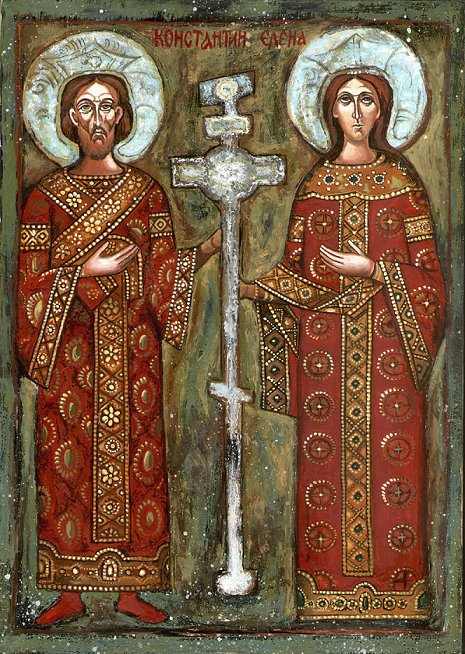
Eastern Orthodox Bulgarian icon of Saint Constantine and Saint Helena

Helena is considered by the Eastern Orthodox Church, Oriental Orthodox Churches, Catholic Church, Lutheranism and Anglicanism as a saint. She is sometimes known as Helen of Constantinople to distinguish her from others with similar names.

Her feast day as a saint of the Eastern Orthodox Church is celebrated with her son on 21 May, the "Feast of the Holy Great Sovereigns Constantine and Helena, Equal to the Apostles". Her feast day in the Roman Catholic Church and in Antiochian Western Rite Vicariate falls on 18 August. Her feast day in the Coptic Orthodox Church is on 9 Pashons. Some Anglican and Lutheran churches keep the 21 May date. Helena is honored in the Church of England on 21 May but in the Episcopal Church on 22 May.

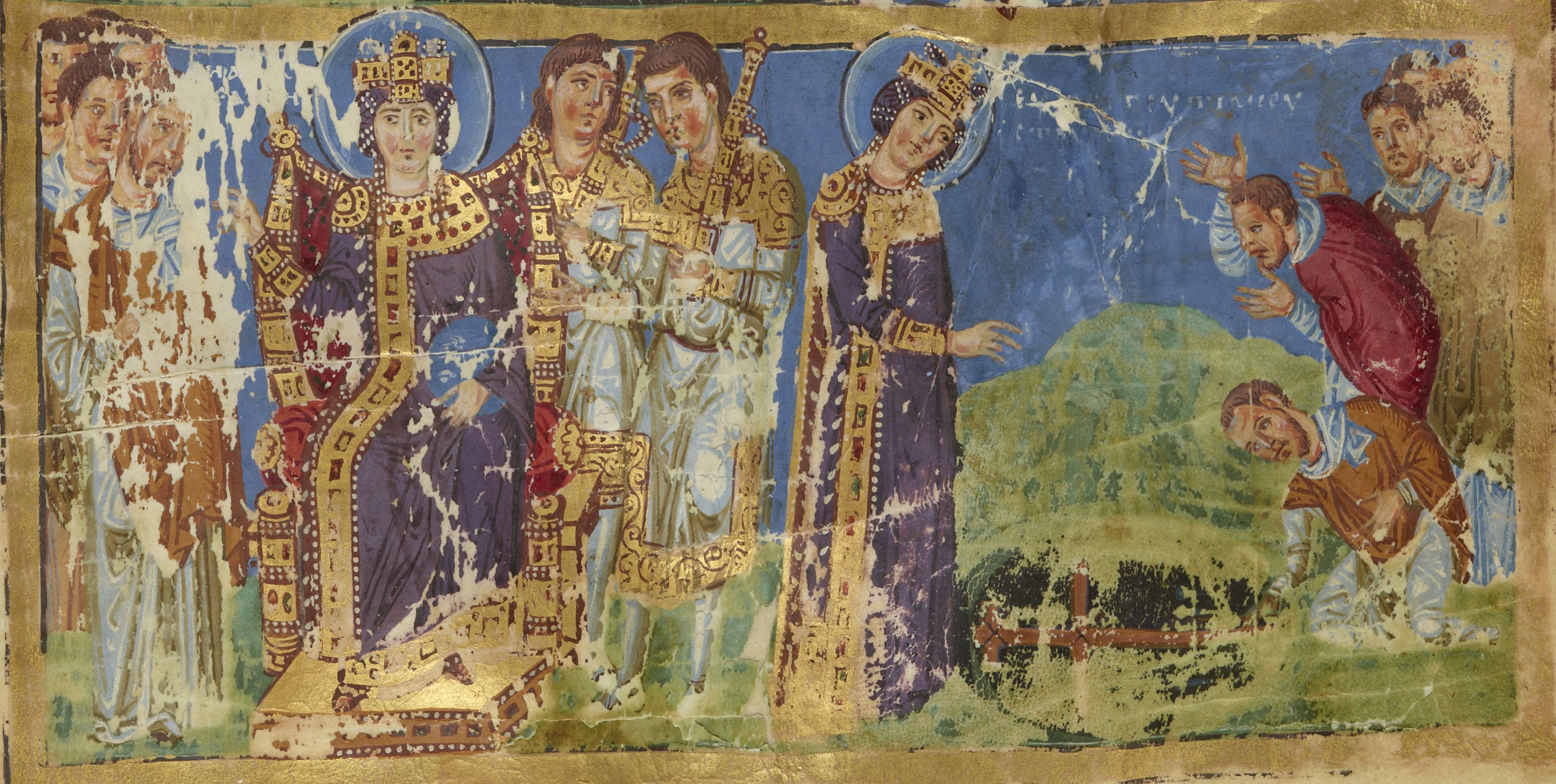
Saint Helena retrieving the true cross, miniature from the 9th century Paris Gregory

In the Ethiopian and Eritrean Orthodox Tewahedo Churches, the feast of Meskel, which commemorates her discovery of the cross, is celebrated on 17 Meskerem in the Ethiopian calendar (27 September, Gregorian calendar, or on 28 September in leap years). The holiday is usually celebrated with the lighting of a large bonfire, or Demera, based on the belief that she had a revelation in a dream. She was told that she should make a bonfire and that the smoke would show her where the true cross was buried. So she ordered the people of Jerusalem to bring wood and make a huge pile. After adding frankincense to it, the bonfire was lit and the smoke rose high up to the sky and returned to the ground, exactly to the spot where the Cross had been buried.

Uncovering of the Precious Cross and the Precious Nails (Roodmas) by Empress Saint Helen in Jerusalem falls on 6 March.

She is also commemorated every Bright Wednesday along with the saints from Mount Sinai, by the Russian Orthodox Church and the Orthodox Church in America.

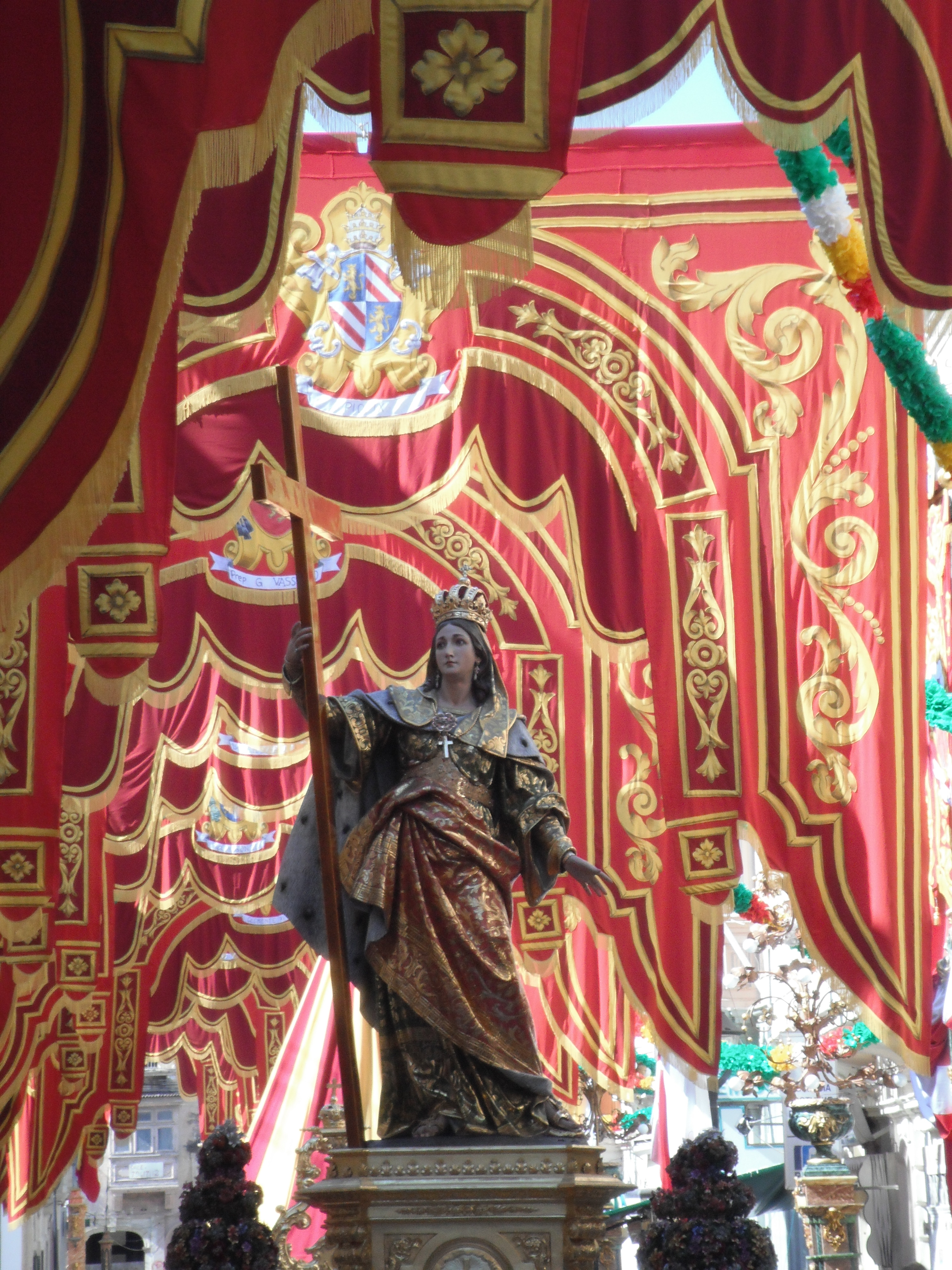
Baroque statue of "Santa Liena" in the 2011 village festa procession of Birkirkara, Malta

== Relics ==
Her alleged skull is displayed in the east crypt of the Cathedral of Trier, in Germany. Portions of her relics are found at the basilica of Santa Maria in Ara Coeli in Rome. Relics were also enshrined at the Abbaye Saint-Pierre d'Hautvillers and subsequently transported to the Église Saint-Leu-Saint-Gilles in Paris.

The church of Sant'Elena in Venice claims to have the complete body of the saint enshrined under the main altar. In 1517, the English priest, Richard Torkington, having seen the relics during a visit to Venice described them as follows: "She lith in a ffayr place of religion, of white monks, ye may see her face perfythly, her body ys covered with a cloth of whith sylke ... Also there lyes upon her breast a lytell crosse made of the holy crosse ..." In an ecumenical gesture, these relics visited the Orthodox Church of Greece and were displayed in the church of Agia Varvara (Saint Barbara) in Athens from 14 May to 15 June 2017.

Smaller relics of Saint Helena are found in Orthodox monasteries and churches in Greece, Cyprus and Romania.

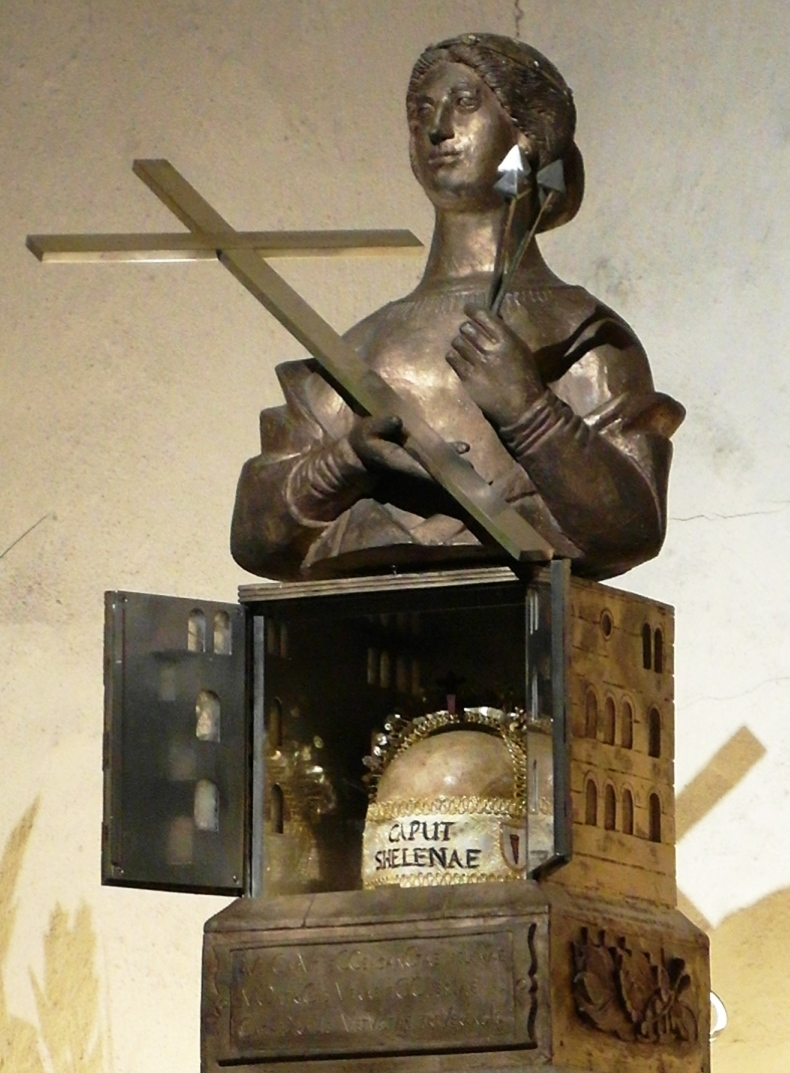
Helena's skull relic in the crypt of Trier Cathedral

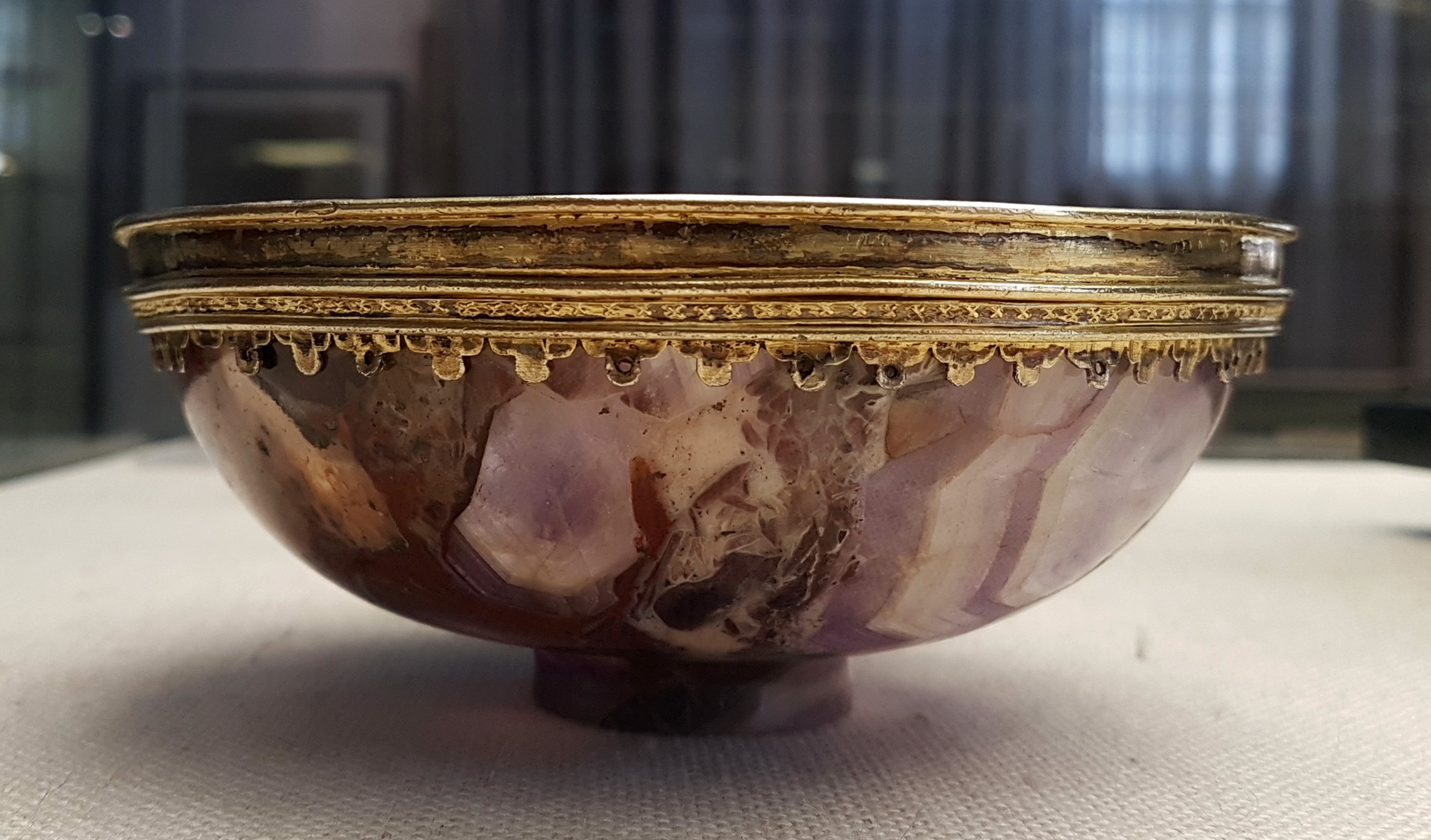
So-called "cup of Saint Helena" in the Treasury of Trier Cathedral

== Later cultural traditions ==
=== In British folklore ===
In Great Britain, later legend, mentioned by Henry of Huntingdon but made popular by Geoffrey of Monmouth, claimed that Helena was a daughter of the King of Britain, Cole of Colchester, who allied with Constantius to avoid more war between the Britons and Rome. (Note: The purely legendary British connection is traced by A. Harbus, Helen of Britain in Medieval Legend, 2002.) Geoffrey further states that she was brought up in the manner of a queen, as she had no brothers to inherit the throne of Britain. The source for this may have been Sozomen's Historia Ecclesiastica, which, however, does not claim Helena was British but only that her son Constantine picked up his Christianity there. Constantine was with his father when he died in York, but neither had spent much time in Britain.

The statement made by English chroniclers of the Middle Ages, according to which Helena was supposed to have been the daughter of a British prince, is entirely without historical foundation. It may arise from the similarly named Welsh princess Saint Elen (alleged to have married Magnus Maximus and to have borne a son named Constantine) or from the misinterpretation of a term used in the fourth chapter of the panegyric on Constantine's marriage with Fausta. The description of Constantine honoring Britain oriendo (lit. "from the outset", "from the beginning") may have been taken as an allusion to his birth ("from his beginning") although it was actually discussing the beginning of his reign.

At least twenty-five holy wells currently exist in the United Kingdom dedicated to a Saint Helen. She is also the patron saint of Abingdon and Colchester. St Helen's Chapel in Colchester was believed to have been founded by Helena herself, and since the 15th century, the town's coat of arms has shown a representation of the True Cross and three crowned nails in her honour. Colchester Town Hall has a Victorian statue of the saint on top of its 50-metre-high (160 ft) tower. The arms of Nottingham are almost identical because of the city's connection with Cole, her supposed father.

=== Filipino legend and tradition ===
Santacruzan honors her and her son Constantine for finding the True Cross with a parade with floral and fluvial themed parade showcasing her, Constantine and other people who followed her journey to find the True Cross. Her discovery of the Cross along with Constantine is dramatised in the Santacruzan, a ritual pageant in the Philippines. Held in May (when Roodmas was once celebrated), the procession also bears elements of the month's Marian devotions. A Santacruzan procession is also held by the Filipino community of Jersey City, New Jersey.

=== Medieval legend and fiction ===
In medieval legend and chivalric romance, Helena appears as a persecuted heroine, in the vein of such women as Emaré and Constance; separated from her husband, she lives a quiet life, supporting herself on her embroidery, until such time as her son's charm and grace wins her husband's attention and so the revelation of their identities.

=== Modern fiction ===
Helena is the protagonist of Evelyn Waugh's 1950 novel Helena. She is also the main character of Priestess of Avalon (2000), a fantasy novel by Marion Zimmer Bradley and Diana L. Paxson. She is given the name Eilan and depicted as a trained priestess of Avalon.

Helena is also the protagonist of Louis de Wohl's novel The Living Wood (1947) in which she is again the daughter of King Coel of Colchester. In the 2021 novel Eagle Ascending by Dan Whitfield she is depicted as having lived to age 118 as result of the powers of the True Cross.

== See also ==
- Notre Dame de la Garoupe
