= Byzantine Palestine =

4th–7th century period

Palaestina
- Territory of the Byzantine Empire
- 324–636
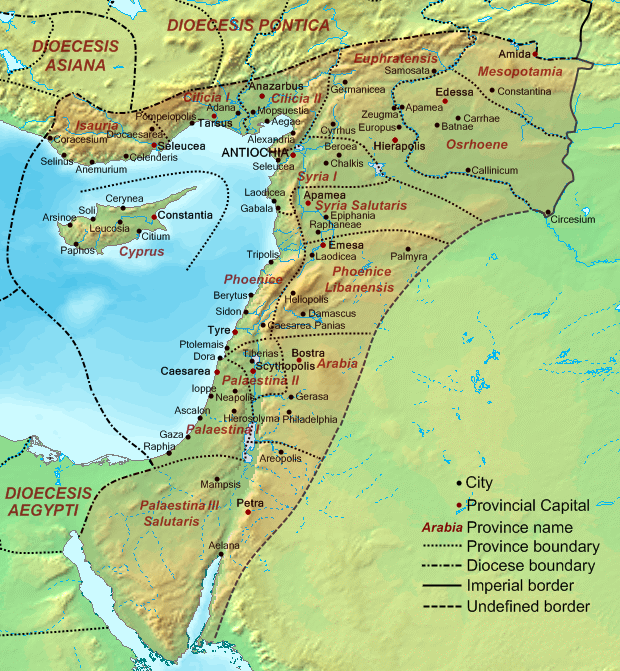
- Diocese of the East provinces, c. 400
- Capital: Caesarea Maritima; Beit She'an; Petra
- Area
  - Coordinates: 32°30′N 35°0′E
- Historical era: Rabbinic period
  - Civil wars of the Tetrarchy: 324
  - Samaritan revolts: 484–573
  - Jewish revolt: 610s
  - Muslim conquest: 636
- Contained within
  - Diocese: East
- Subdivisions
  - Type: Provinces
  - Units: Prima; Secunda; Salutaris
Preceded by	Succeeded by
Roman Palestine	Bilad al-Sham
- Today part of: Israel; Palestine; Jordan

Byzantine Palestine or Palaestina refers to the geographic, political, and cultural landscape of Palestine during the period of Byzantine rule (early 4th to mid-7th centuries CE), beginning with the consolidation of Constantine's power in the early 4th century CE and lasting until the Arab-Muslim conquest in the 7th century CE. The term generally designates the territories reorganized into the provinces of Palaestina Prima, Secunda, and Tertia (or Salutaris) between the late 4th and 5th centuries (covering most of modern-day Israel and Palestine and parts of Jordan and Syria.

The title "Byzantine" is a modern and artificial term which has been called "imaginary". This division is not unique for Palestine and related to the historiographical line between Ancient history and the Middle Ages. The Byzantine period in Palestine was politically a direct continuation of Roman rule, which began with Pompey's conquest in 63 BCE and, from 395 CE, persisted in the form of the Eastern Roman Empire. Culturally, it followed a historical continuum that began in 332 BCE with the conquest of Alexander the Great and the incorporation of the Levant into the Hellenistic world, later evolving into a Hellenistic–Roman–Byzantine sphere. The Byzantine period is most distinguished from earlier times by major religious and demographic changes. Christianity became the state religion and Palestine assumed a central place in the Christian world, while the Jewish, Samaritan and polytheistic populations, facing increasing restrictions, became religious minorities. The Jewish community declined in influence relative to diaspora communities, with the Babylonian Jewish community emerging as the leading center of Judaism.

== Administration ==
During Diocletian reign (r. 284 – 305 CE) the Empire's political divisions were reorganized. He introduced the Tetrarchy system, where the empire was split between east and west, each ruled by a co-emperor titled Augustus. It was later made that each Augustus appointed an heir which would rule half of his domain and bear the title of Caesar, making the empire split between four constituent parts. Each of these parts were governed by a Praetorian prefect. The empire was further divided into smaller administrative units called dioceses. While the system of four co-emperors collapsed almost immediately, the provincial division remained intact throughout the Byzantine period. The province of Palaestina was included within the Diocese of the East, part of the Praetorian prefecture of the East.

=== 4th century ===
Since the First Jewish–Roman War (70 CE), the province of Judaea (from the 130s, Syria Palaestina) was administered by governor of a Legatus Augusti pro praetore rank, responsible for military and judicial matters, and a Procurator responsible for financial matters. The capital was Caesarea Maritima and the province included most of modern-day Israel and Palestine, as well as a strip of land called Perea (modern-day Jordan) and excluding the Galilee and Golan Heights regions, which were part of Phoenice, and the Negev which was part of Arabia. The reforms of Diocletian transformed the military responsibility from the governor to a new office: Dux Palaestinae. The governor's role was administering justice, collecting taxes, maintaining the treasury, and preserving public order with a reduced military force. The governor's title changed to iudex ("judge"). His rank was of praeses, later elevated to consularis, and in the 380s CE to proconsul. This reflects an expansion of his office and the allocation of greater funds.

The province of Palaestina underwent numerous transformations during the 4th century CE, the exact chronology of which remains ambiguous. While Diocletian's reforms generally aimed to reduce the size of provinces, Palaestina was enlarged in the south at the expense of Arabia, with the annexation of the Negev, Sinai, and parts of Transjordan south of Wadi al-Hasa around 295 CE. Dora was also annexed from Phoenice. The territories in the south appear to have been transferred between Palaestina and Arabia on several occasions during the 4th century, possibly as many as six times. In some sources, a province called "New Arabia" is mentioned between 315 and the late 4th century, with its capital at Eleutheropolis, though both its boundaries and even its existence are disputed by modern scholars. In 357/8, the southern parts of Palaestina, including the town of Elusa, seem to have been incorporated into a smaller province, which was also called Palaestina (and likely an early predecessor to Palaestina Salutaris) and later reabsorbed back into Palaestina. It is possible that the reunification of Palaestina was linked to the implementation of Theodosius I's religious reforms, and it is around the last years of his reign that Palaestina was divided into three provinces.

=== Provinces ===
The ultimate partition of Palaestina into three provinces took place in the turn of the 5th century, sometime between 390 and 409 CE. Most of Palaestina was included in Palaestina Prima, whose capital remained in Caesarea Maritima, but the governor's rank was reduced back to Consularis. Palaestina Secunda in the north included the northern Samarian Highlands, the western Galilee and northern Perea (modern-day southern Syria). It was goverend by a Praeses from Scythopolis. The province of Palaestina Salutaris (or "Palaestina Tertia") in the south included the Negev, Sinai and southern Transjordan. Its capital was Petra and it was ruled also by a Praeses. This administrative division remained mostly unchanged until the reign of Justinian I, with one exception. Sometime between the middle of the 5th century and 518 CE, the border of Palaestina Salutaris was extended north until Wadi Mujib, at the expense of Arabia. A major transformation occurred in 529, following the Samaritan revolts, the rank of the governor of Palaestina Secunda was elevated to that of a Consularis. In 536, Justinian I elevated the rank of the governor of Palaestina Prima to Proconsul and gave him permission to interfere in Palaestina Secunda in case the local governor could not quell local unrest, as well as recruit troops from Dux Palaestinae.

== Population ==
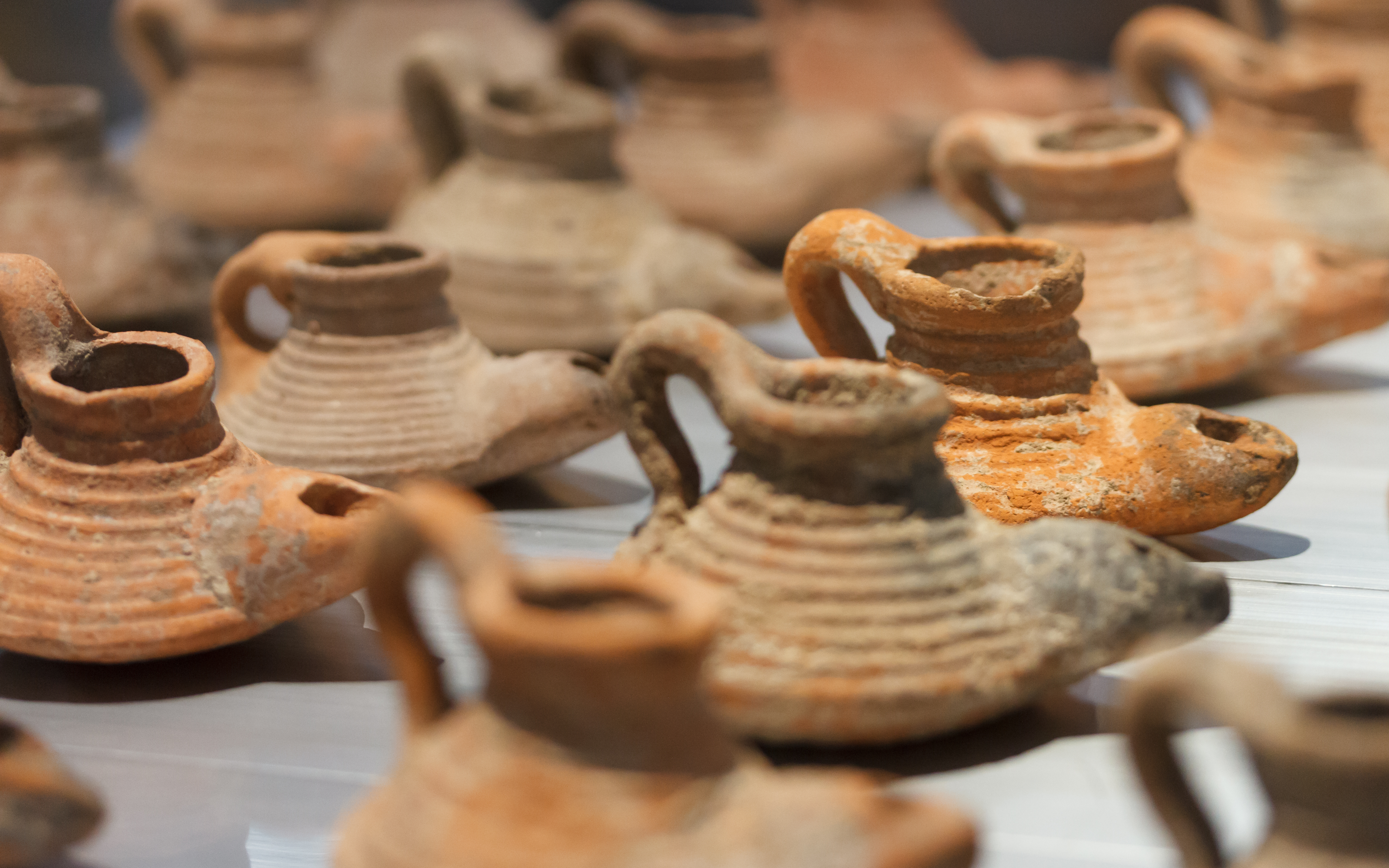
Byzantine period oil lamps excavated in Gaza and on display in Saved Treasures of Gaza: 5000 Years of History

Between the 4th and mid 6th centuries CE, Byzantine Palestine experienced considerable demographic growth. Present conventional estimates for the population of Palaestina in the mid 6th century CE, based on qualitative analysis of archaeological data and agricultural potential, stand at around 1 million inhabitants. In early stages of research it was believed that this growth was linked to the desecration of Palestine in the 4th century, a view which was accepted by many scholars. Recent developments in archaeological research and the expanding the dataset have led scholars to conclude that population growth began already in the 2nd and 3rd centuries, similar to other regions throughout the empire. This process reached a halt and decline from mid-6th century, following the Samaritan revolts, plagues and political crises.

Religiously, the population of Palestine comprised four main groups: Jews, Samaritans, polytheists, and Christians. In the 4th century and most of the 5th century, polytheists formed the majority, particularly in the southern regions. By the late 5th century, Christians had become the largest religious group. In the 5th and 6th centuries, polytheism declined sharply and virtually disappeared, largely as a result of imperial and ecclesiastical policies.

=== Jews ===
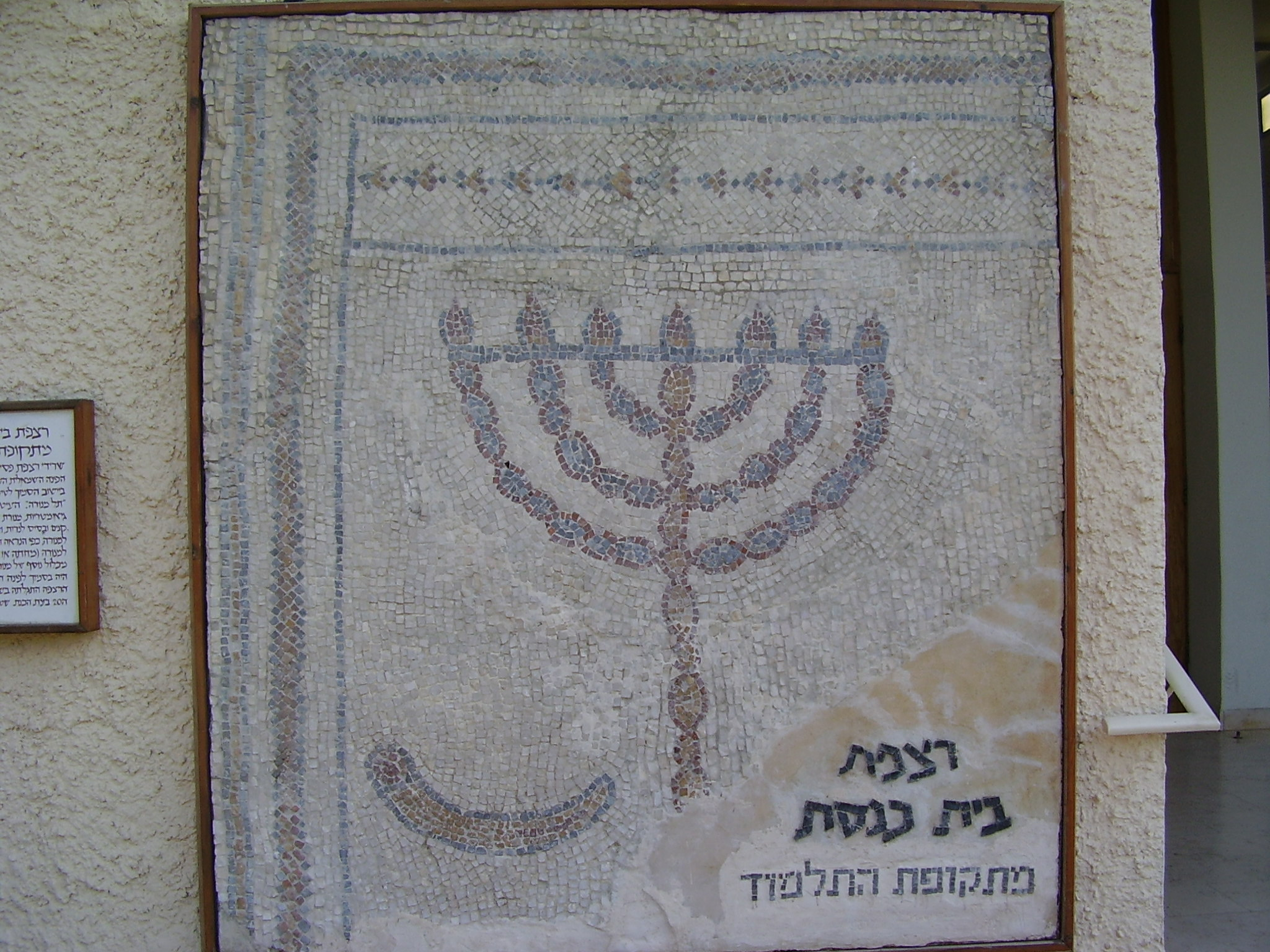
Ancient mosaic depicting the Temple menorah and shofar, discovered near Tirat Zvi

During the first generation of Christian rule in Palestine, Jewish communities were pressured by what they saw as the appropriation of the Land of Israel into a Christian Holy Land. Together with increasing Anti-Jewish sentiment from Christian communities and leadership, this culminated into a Jewish revolt in the Galilee which was launched in Sepphoris in 350 CE, with Patricius proclaimed as the leader. At that time the Roman empire fell into a civil war between emperor Constantius II and Magnentius. Constantius Gallus, the ruler of the who sent the Roman general Ursicinus, who crushed the rebellion in 351 CE.

In 361 CE, Julian became the last non-Christian emperor of the Roman Empire. He rejected the Christian faith and sought to restore the traditional Roman religion. As part of this endeavor, he promised the Jews to build the Third Temple in Jerusalem. In 363 CE, a pair of severe earthquakes shook Palestine and Syria and led to a halt in the construction efforts. Later that year Julian was killed in his campaign against the Sasanian Empire and the project was completely abandoned as all subsequent emperors were Christians.

The Jewish community had maintained its autonomy under the Sanhedrin throughout most of the 4th century CE. However during the reign Arcadius, an imperial law was issued in 398 which limited the Sanhedrin's jurisdiction on civil matters. Emperors Theodosius II further imposed a ban on the construction of new synagogues and deprived the Gamaliel VI, the Nasi of the Sanhedrin from his honorary titles. Upon Gamliel's death in 429 CE, Theodosius II abolished the institution of Sanhedrin, diverting its taxes to imperial officers.

=== Christians ===
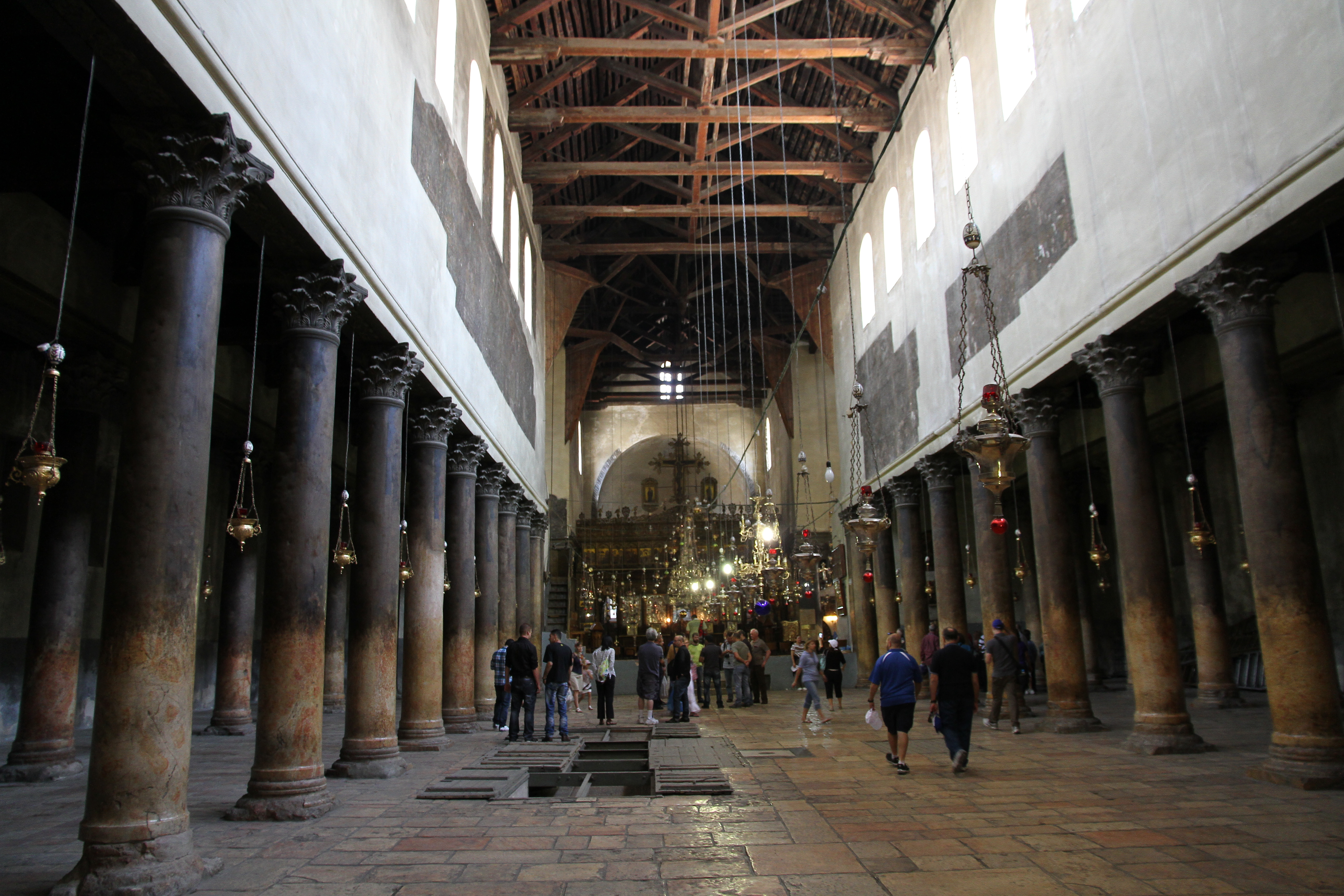
The nave of the Church of the Nativity in Bethlehem, which was rebuilt in the 6th century

The veneration of Palestine as the Holy Land intensified after Constantine established his rule over the eastern half of the Roman Empire in 324 CE. In 325 CE, he convened the First Council of Nicaea, where bishops from across the empire gathered to reach consensus on theological matters. Among the participants were Macarius of Jerusalem and Eusebius of Caesarea, and the see of Jerusalem was accorded a special honor. In 326 CE, Constantine's mother Helena made a pilgrimage to the Holy Land and supported Macarius's construction projects in Jerusalem. The most significant was the Church of the Anastasis (later known as the Church of the Holy Sepulchre), built at the site identified by tradition as the location of Jesus's burial, where the Temple of Aphrodite had previously stood. This church became a focal point for Christian Jerusalem.

Other churches from this period include the Church of Eleona on the Mount of Olives, the Church of the Nativity in Bethlehem, a 5th-century church in Jabalia, a pair of churches at Khirbet et-Tireh, and the Church of Mamre in Hebron. The latter was reportedly constructed at Constantine's suggestion to suppress a syncretic cult practiced at the site by Christians, Jews, and polytheists. In the Galilee, Joseph of Tiberias, a Christian convert from Judaism known from the writings of Epiphanius of Salamis, established churches in towns with significant Jewish populations, including Tiberias, Sepphoris, Nazareth, and Capernaum.

== See also ==
- Jerusalem during the Byzantine period

== Bibliography ==
- Avi-Yonah, M. (1958). "The Economics of Byzantine Palestine". Israel Exploration Journal. 8 (1): 39–51. JSTOR 27924723.
- Avi-Yonah, M. (2002). The Holy Land: A Historical Geography from the Persian to the Arab conquest, 536 B.C. to A.D. 640. Carta Jerusalem. ISBN 965-220-502-8.
- Bar, D. (2004). "Population, Settlement and Economy in Late Roman and Byzantine Palestine (70-641 AD)". Bulletin of the School of Oriental and African Studies. 67 (3): 307–320. doi:10.1017/S0041977X04000217. JSTOR 4145797.
- Chancey, M. A.; Porter, A. L. (December 2001). "The Archaeology of Roman Palestine". Near Eastern Archaeology. 64 (4): 164–203. doi:10.2307/3210829. JSTOR 3210829.
- Dauphin, C. (2024). "Changes in the Infrastructure and Population of Byzantine Palestine". In Hezser, Catherine (ed.). The Routledge Handbook of Jews and Judaism in Late Antiquity (1st ed.). Routledge. ISBN 978-1315280950.
- Di Segni, L. (2022). "מִנהל פלסטינה מימי דיוקלטיאנוס ועד הכיבוש המוסלמי" [The Administration of Palestine from the Time of Diocletian to the Muslim Conquest]. In Patrich, J.; Limor, O.; Newman, H. (eds.). Eretz Israel in Late Antiquity: Introductions and Studies (in Hebrew). Vol. 1. Jerusalem: Yad Ben Zvi.
- Filipczak, P. (2015). An introduction to the Byzantine administration in Syro-Palestine on the eve of the Arab conquest. Poland: Wydawnictwo Uniwersytetu Łódzkiego. ISBN 978-83-7969-661-1.
- Herr, M. D. (2022). "ארץ-ישראל בשלהי העת העתיקה (324 - 640): מבוא כללי" [Eretz Israel in Late Antiquity (324 - 640): General Introduction]. In Patrich, J.; Limor, O.; Newman, H. (eds.). Eretz Israel in Late Antiquity: Introductions and Studies (in Hebrew). Vol. 1. Jerusalem: Yad Ben Zvi.
- Al-Houdalieh, Salah H. (2016). "A Clay Bread Stamp from Khirbet et-Tireh". Near Eastern Archaeology. 79 (4): 272–275. doi:10.5615/neareastarch.79.4.0272. JSTOR 10.5615/neareastarch.79.4.0272.
- Humbert, Jean-Baptiste (1999). "The rivers of Paradise in the Byzantine Church near Jabaliyah – Gaza". In Piccirillo, Michele; Alliata, Eugenio (eds.). The Madaba Map Centenary 1897–1997: Travelling Through the Byzantine Umayyad Period. Collectio maior. Vol. 40. Jerusalem: Studium Biblicum Franciscanum. pp. 216–218. Archived from the original on 27 February 2009.
- Lewin, A. (2005). The Archaeology of Ancient Judea and Palestine. Italy: Getty Publications. ISBN 978-0-89236-800-6.
- Nathanson, B. G. (1986). "Jews, Christians, and the Gallus Revolt in Fourth-Century Palestine". The Biblical Archaeologist. 49 (1): 26–36. doi:10.2307/3209979. JSTOR 3209979.
- Parker, T. (1999). "An Empire's New Holy Land: The Byzantine Period". Near Eastern Archaeology. 63 (3): 134–180. doi:10.2307/3210712. JSTOR 3210712.
- Perrone, L. (2022). "שמחי ציון, אם כל הכנסיות": הנצרות בארץ הקודש בשלהי העת העתיקה"" [Rejoice Zion, Mother of All Churches’: Christianity in the Holy Land in Late Antiquity]. In Patrich, J.; Limor, O.; Newman, H. (eds.). Eretz Israel in Late Antiquity: Introductions and Studies (in Hebrew). Vol. 1. Jerusalem: Yad Ben Zvi.
- Wilken, R. L. (1988). "Byzantine Palestine: A Christian Holy Land". The Biblical Archaeologist. 51 (4): 214–217+233–237. doi:10.2307/3210073. JSTOR 3210073.
