= Temple of Venus (Aelia Capitolina) =

The Temple of Venus in Aelia Capitolina was a temple in Aelia Capitolina (Jerusalem), dedicated to the Goddess Venus.

The temple was founded on the order of emperor Hadrian in the early 2nd century AD. It was dedicated to Venus, who was the protective patron deity of the family of Hadrian as well as of the 10th Legion who occupied the area.

In 324, the Christian Helena, mother of Constantine I was shown the site and the temple during her pilgrimage to Jerusalem during the persecution of Pagans. The temple was demolished and a grave and a hill was discovered, which was referred to as Golgata, and the Church of the Holy Sepulchre was inaugurated on the site of the former Venus temple in 335.

Remains of a Roman building have been discovered underneath the Church of the Holy Sepulchre.
