= Aelia Capitolina =

Roman colony built on the ruins of Jerusalem

- Location within Jerusalem
- 31.775689°N 35.23104°E
- Location: Jerusalem

Aelia Capitolina (Latin: Colonia Aelia Capitolina [kɔˈloːni.a ˈae̯li.a kapɪtoːˈliːna]) was a Roman colony founded during the Roman emperor Hadrian's visit to Judaea in 129/130 CE. It was founded on the ruins of Jerusalem, which had been almost totally razed after the siege of 70 CE. This act marked a significant transformation of the city from a Jewish metropolis to a small pagan settlement dedicated to the cult of Capitoline Jupiter.

The population of Aelia Capitolina consisted primarily of Roman legionaries, veterans, and other non-Jewish settlers. Jews were forbidden entrance to the city. The city's urban layout was redesigned with broad colonnaded streets, arched gateways, and forums that served as commercial and social hubs. The religious landscape also shifted, with the worship of Roman deities replacing the Jewish religious practices that had been centered around the Temple in Jerusalem. Aelia Capitolina remained a relatively minor city within the Roman Empire, with an estimated population of around 4,000, significantly lower than the population during the late Second Temple period.

The modest colony would change dramatically starting in the early 4th century, when Constantine the Great granted Christianity legal status within the Roman Empire. This led to the construction of the Church of the Holy Sepulchre, laying the groundwork for its eventual transformation into a prominent Christian center during the Byzantine period. The ban on Jews was maintained until the Muslim conquest of Jerusalem in 636. The Aelia part of the name was used in Arabic as Īlyāʾ during the Umayyad Caliphate.

== Name ==
Aelia came from Hadrian's Aelia gens, while Capitolina meant that the new city was dedicated to Jupiter Capitolinus, whom the Romans believed had vanquished and replaced the God of the Jews. A temple to Jupiter was built in the city. The Latin name Aelia is the source of the much later term Īlyāʾ (إيليا), a 7th-century early Arab name for Jerusalem.

== Founding ==
In 129–130 CE, Hadrian visited Judaea. Jerusalem, once heavily rebuilt by Herod the Great, was still in ruins following the decisive siege of the city in 70 CE as part of the First Jewish–Roman War. The emperor resolved to reconstruct the city as a Roman colony dedicated to Jupiter. The decision to rebuild the city with a pagan character was seen by the Jewish population as a direct affront to their religion. Mary E. Smallwood writes that the foundation of Aelia Capitolina was likely "an attempt to combat resurgent Jewish nationalism" by secularizing the Jewish capital. Martin Goodman describes Hadrian's decision as a deliberate effort to enact a "final solution for Jewish rebelliousness," aiming to erase the city permanently and prevent future uprisings, both in Judaea and among diaspora communities, as had occurred under Trajan. According to Goodman, the foundation of a Roman colony—rather than a Hellenistic polis—was designed to transplant foreign populations and impose Roman religious practices. While Hadrian established many cities, this case was distinct, as it was "not to flatter but to suppress the natives."

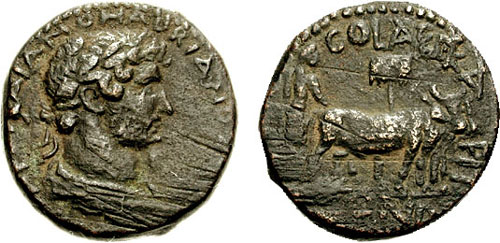
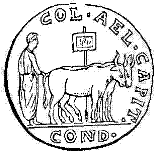
The first coin issued at the mint of Aelia Capitolina about 130/132. Reverse: COL[ONIA] AEL[IA] CAPIT[OLINA] COND[ITA] ('The founding of Colonia Aelia Capitolina'), showing Hadrian while ploughing the first furrow.

In the past, conflicting accounts in ancient sources led scholars to debate whether Aelia Capitolina's foundation was a cause or a consequence of the Bar Kokhba revolt (132–135 CE). According to Cassius Dio, Hadrian's decision to rebuild Jerusalem and erect a temple to Jupiter on the site of the former Jewish Temple was a direct catalyst for the revolt. He writes that the construction "caused a long and serious war, since the Jews objected to having gentiles settled in their city and foreign cults established there." (Note: Cassius Dio, LXIX, 12, 1-2) In contrast, Eusebius of Caesarea, writing from a Christian perspective, framed the establishment of Aelia Capitolina as a punitive measure following the Jewish defeat. He wrote that when the city "had been emptied of the Jewish nation and had suffered the total destruction of its ancient inhabitants, it was colonized by a different race, and the Roman city which subsequently arose changed its name and was called Aelia". (Note: Eusebius, Ecclesiastical History, IV, 6.3–6.4) Supporters of this view regarded the construction of Aelia Capitolina as part of Hadrian's broader policies to suppress Jewish nationalism following the revolt, including the prohibition of circumcision, the expulsion of Jews from Jerusalem, and the renaming of Judaea as Syria Palaestina, removing its Jewish-associated name.

The discovery of Aelia Capitolina coins struck before the revolt, found in a building abandoned prior to the uprising and in coin hoards from Bar Kokhba refuge caves, has provided strong archaeological evidence that the city's foundation preceded the revolt. This evidence has led most modern historians to favor Cassius Dio's account, placing Hadrian's urban and religious policies as key factors that contributed to Jewish resistance. Meanwhile, Eusebius' interpretation, which presents the city's reconstruction as a post-revolt punishment, is now seen as likely influenced by a supersessionist theology.

Aelia Capitolina (Jerusalem)
- AD 130 – AD 324–325
Jerusalem during the Early Roman period	Jerusalem during the Byzantine period
- Jerusalem in the Roman Empire under Hadrian showing the location of the Roman legions

== Construction and plan ==
Jerusalem was rebuilt in the style of its original Hippodamian plan, although adapted to Roman use. Jews were prohibited from entering the city on pain of death except for one day each year: during the fast day of Tisha B'Av. Taken together, these measures (which also affected Jewish Christians) essentially secularized the city. Historical sources and archaeological evidence indicate that veterans of the Roman military and immigrants from the western parts of the empire now inhabited the rebuilt city.

Archaeological evidence from this period indicates that Roman customs, including pork consumption and the presence of statues and figured decorations, became widespread. Jewish symbols and practices, such as the use of miqvaot (ritual baths) and traditional stone vessels, disappeared.

The city was without walls, protected by a light garrison of Legio X Fretensis during the Late Roman period. The detachment at Jerusalem, which encamped all over the city's western hill, was responsible for preventing Jews from returning to the city. Roman enforcement of this prohibition continued through the 4th century.

The two pairs of main roads—the cardines (north-south) and decumani (east-west)—in Aelia Capitolina.

=== Layout and street pattern ===
The urban plan of Aelia Capitolina was that of a typical Roman town wherein main thoroughfares crisscrossed the urban grid lengthwise and widthwise. The urban grid was based on the usual central north–south road (cardo maximus) and central east–west route (decumanus maximus). However, as the main cardo ran up the western hill, and the Temple Mount blocked the eastward route of the main decumanus, the strict pattern had to be adapted to the local topography; a secondary, eastern cardo, diverged from the western one and ran down the Tyropoeon Valley, while the decumanus had to zigzag around the Temple Mount, passing it on its northern side. The Hadrianic western cardo terminated not far beyond its junction with the decumanus, where it reached the Roman garrison's encampment, but in the Byzantine period, it was extended over the former camp to reach the southern, expanded margins of the city.

The two cardines converged near the Damascus Gate, and a semicircular piazza covered the remaining space; in the piazza, a columnar monument was constructed, hence the Arabic name for the gate, Bab el-Amud ("Gate of the Column"). Tetrapylones were constructed at the other junctions between the main roads.

This street pattern has been preserved in the Old City of Jerusalem to the present. The original thoroughfare, flanked by rows of columns and shops, was about 73 feet (22 meters) wide, but buildings have extended onto the streets over the centuries, and the modern lanes replacing the ancient grid are now quite narrow. The substantial remains of the western cardo have now been exposed to view near the junction with Suq el-Bazaar, and remnants of one of the tetrapylones are preserved in the 19th-century Franciscan chapel at the junction of the Via Dolorosa and suq Khan az-Zait.

=== Western forum ===
As was standard for new Roman cities, Hadrian placed the city's main forum at the junction of the main cardo and decumanus, now the location for the (smaller) Muristan. Adjacent to the forum, Hadrian built a large temple to Venus, at a site later used for the construction of the Church of the Holy Sepulchre; several boundary walls of Hadrian's temple have been found among the archaeological remains beneath the church.

=== Valley cardo and eastern forum ===
The Struthion Pool lay in the path of the northern decumanus, so Hadrian placed vaulting over it, added a large pavement on top, and turned it into a secondary forum; the pavement can still be seen under the Convent of the Sisters of Zion.

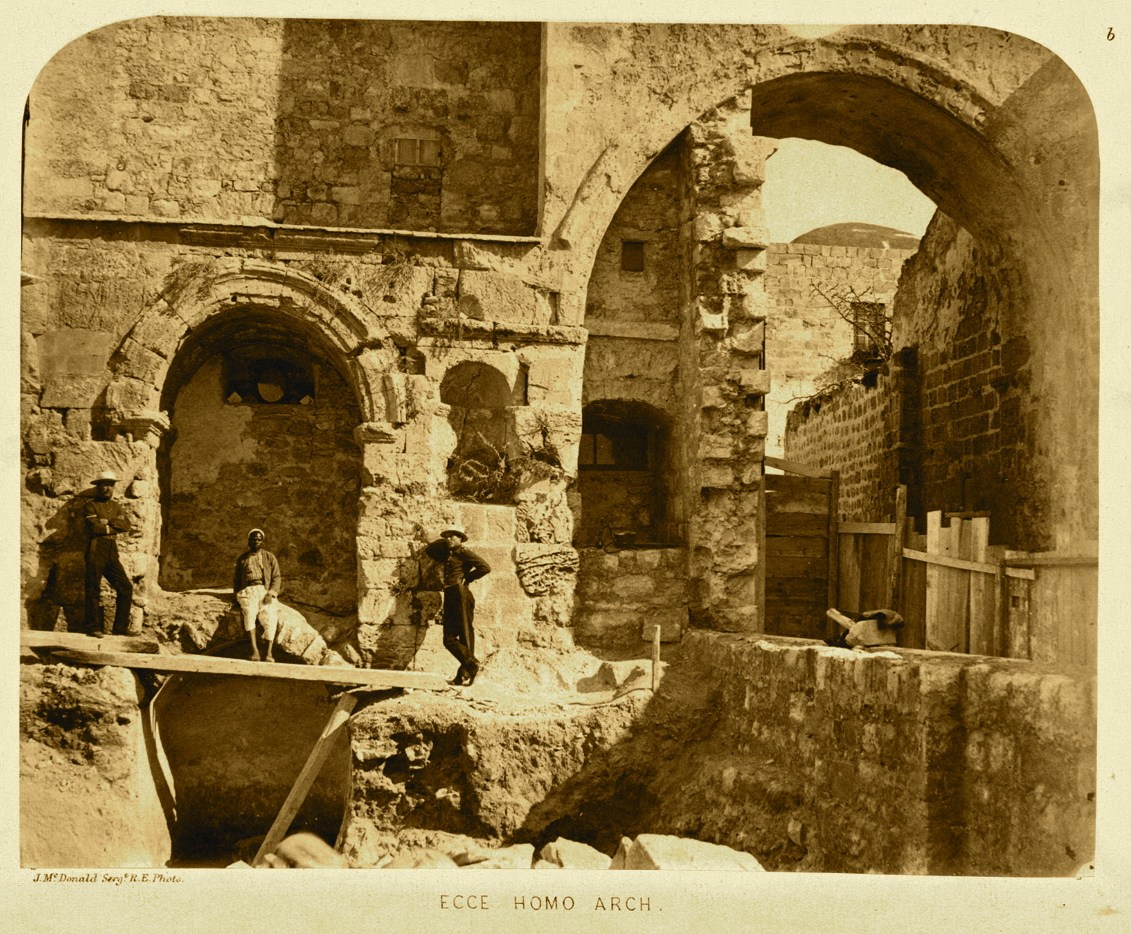
The remaining two arches of the gateway in 1864; the smaller arch (left) was incorporated in the Basilica of Ecce Homo.

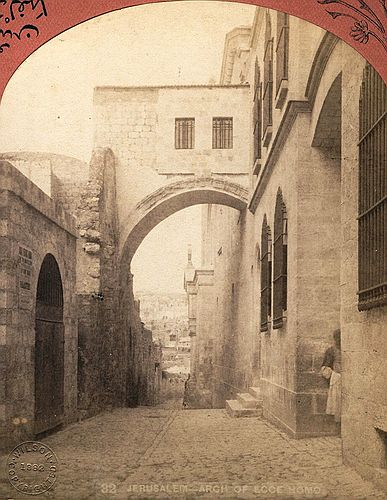
The portion of the arch visible today (approx. 180° opposite the former image)

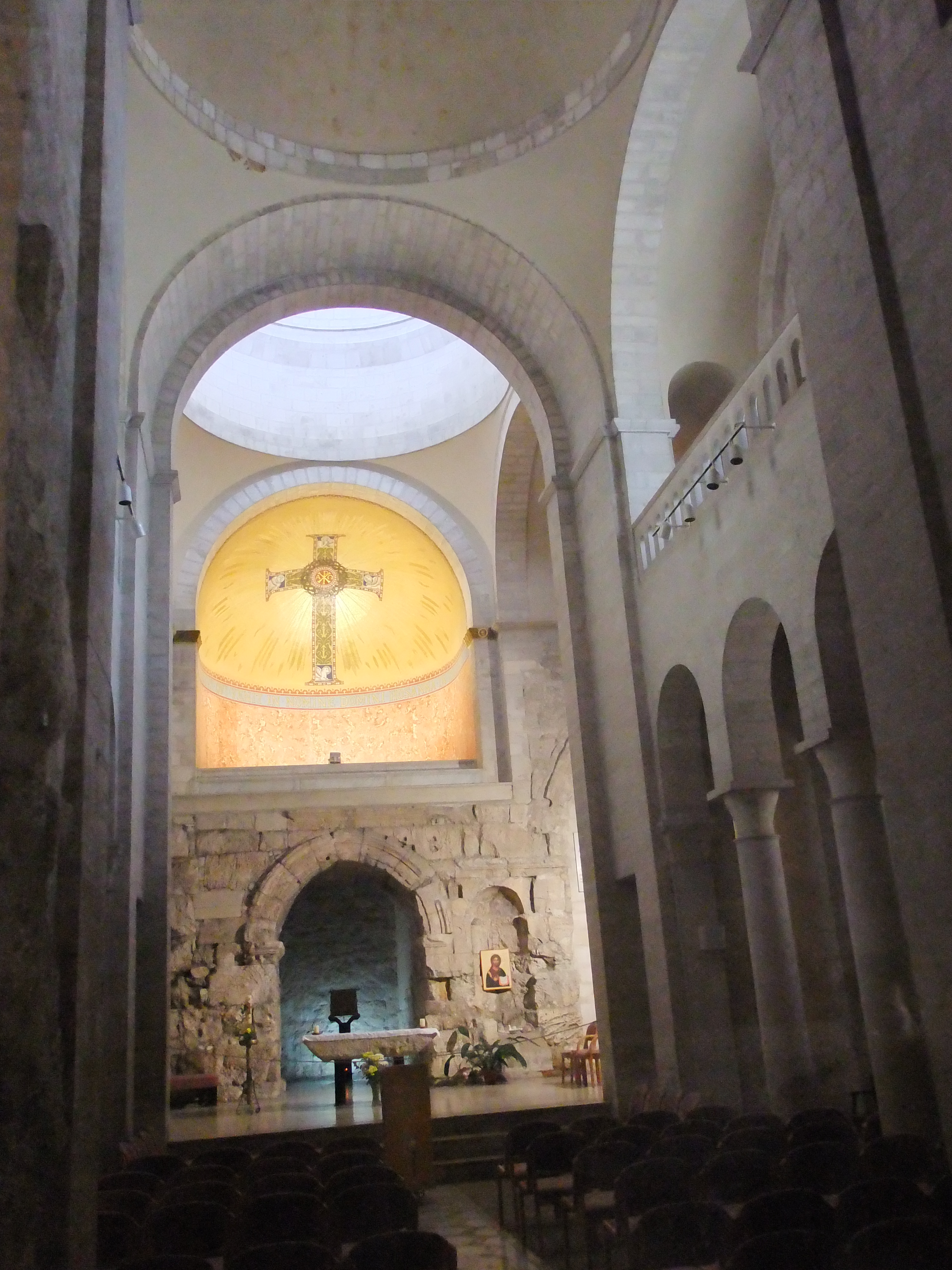
The basilica interior preserves the northern arch of the Aelia Capitolina's eastern forum gateway under its apse.

=== Ecce homo arch ===
Near the Struthion Pool, Hadrian built a triple-arched gateway as an entrance to the eastern forum of Aelia Capitolina. Traditionally, this was thought to be the gate of Herod's Antonia Fortress, which itself was alleged to be the location of Jesus' trial and Pontius Pilate's Ecce homo speech as described in John 19:13. This was due in part to the 1864 discovery of a game etched on a flagstone of the pool. According to the convent's nuns, the game was played by Roman soldiers and may have ended in the execution of a 'mock king'. Ermete Pierotti is the first to term the words Ecce Homo to the arch, in reference to Pilate's words to Jesus. It is possible that following its destruction, the Antonia Fortress's pavement tiles were brought to the cistern of Hadrian's plaza.

When later constructions narrowed the Via Dolorosa, the two arches on either side of the central arch became incorporated into a succession of more modern buildings. The Basilica of Ecce Homo now preserves the northern arch. The southern arch was incorporated into a zawiya (Sufi monastery) for Uzbek dervishes of the Naqshbandi order in the 16th century, but these were demolished in the 19th century in order to found a mosque.

== Population ==
Aelia Capitolina remained a relatively minor city within the Roman Empire, with an estimated population of around 4,000 inhabitants, significantly lower than the population during the late Second Temple period. The demographic consisted primarily of Roman legionaries, veterans, and other non-Jewish settlers.

Jews were permitted to enter Aelia Capitolina only once a year, on Tisha B'Av, to mourn the destruction of the Second Temple. A Christian pilgrim from Bordeaux, who visited the city in 333, recorded that Jews would gather annually to anoint a perforated stone, where they would "bewail themselves with groans, rend their garments, and so depart." Similarly, Jerome described the annual Jewish pilgrimage to the city, writing: And in order for them to be allowed to weep over the ruin of their city, they pay a fine [...] on the day in which Jerusalem was captured and plundered by the Romans, the people came mourning, the feeble foolish women assemble, and the old men, covered with years and rags, show the wrath of the Lord in their bodies and in their physical appearance.

According to Eusebius, the Jerusalem church was dispersed twice, first in 70 CE and again in 135 CE. A key distinction between these periods is that from 70 to 130 CE, the bishops of Jerusalem bore Jewish names, whereas after 135 CE, the bishops of Aelia Capitolina appear to have been Greek. Eusebius' evidence for the continuation of a church at Aelia Capitolina is confirmed by the Itinerarium Burdigalense, a 4th-century Christian travelogue.

== Later history ==
The reign of Constantine the Great and the construction of the Church of the Holy Sepulchre in the early 4th century initiated the process of Christian establishment in Jerusalem, eventually transforming the small colony into a prominent Christian center. The city was later ranked the fifth imperial patriarchate, alongside Rome, Alexandria, Constantinople, and Antioch. This transformation continued over the next three centuries during the Byzantine period until the Muslim conquest of the city in 636/7.

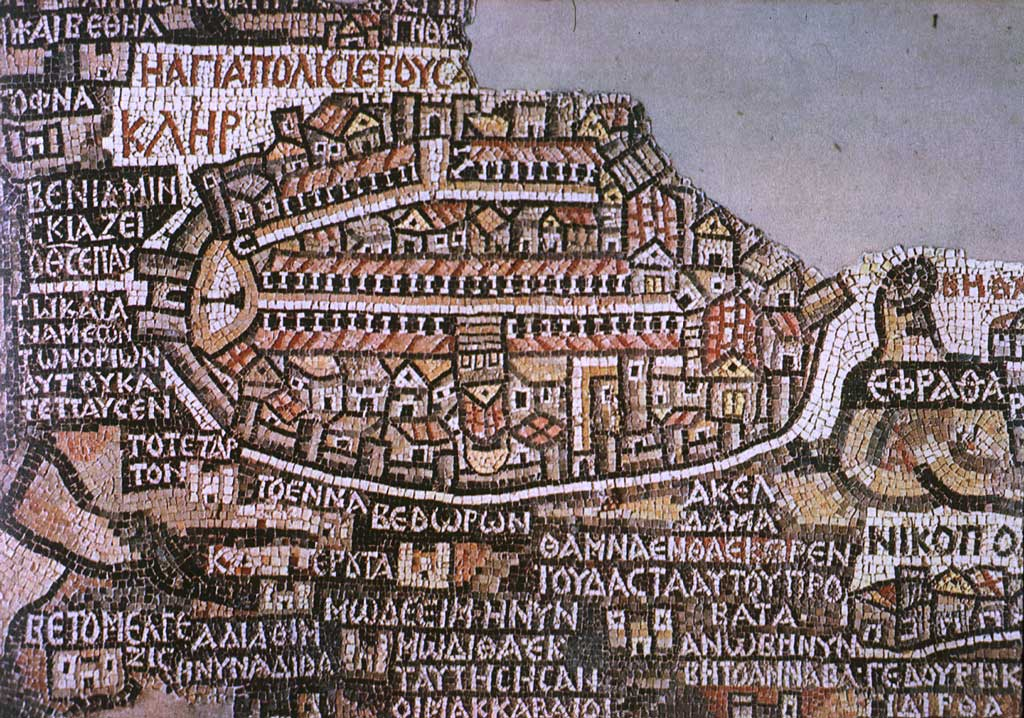
The Madaba Map depiction of 6th-century Jerusalem has the Cardo Maximus, the town's main street, beginning at the northern gate (today's Damascus Gate), and traversing the city in a straight line south to "New Church".

The ban on Jewish entry remained in place after the Christianization of the Roman Empire, and continued until the 7th-century Muslim conquest of Jerusalem. Christians had been allowed to visit the city since the 4th century, when Constantine ordered the construction of Christian holy sites in the city. Burial remains from the Byzantine period are exclusively Christian, suggesting that the population of Jerusalem in Byzantine times probably consisted only of Christians.

In the fifth century, the emperor based in Constantinople maintained control of the city, but following Sasanian emperor Khosrow II's early 7th-century advance through Syria, his generals Shahrbaraz and Shahin Vahmanzadegan attacked Jerusalem, aided by the Jews of Palaestina Prima, who had risen against the Byzantines. In 614, after 21 days of siege, Jerusalem was captured. Byzantine chronicles relate that the Sasanian and Jewish forces slaughtered tens of thousands of Christians in the city, many at the Mamilla Pool, and destroyed their monuments and churches, including the Church of the Holy Sepulchre. The conquered city would remain in Sasanian hands for some fifteen years. It was reconquered by emperor Heraclius in 629.

Byzantine Jerusalem was conquered by the armies of Umar, the Rashid caliph, in 636, which resulted in the removal of the restrictions on Jews living in the city. In this era, it was referred to in Arabic as Madinat Bayt al-Maqdis "City of the Temple", a name restricted to the Temple Mount. The rest of the city was called Ilyā, reflecting the Roman name Aelia. (Note: "Till the time of Constantine, and for at least two centuries later, Aelia remained the official name and usual geographical designation; was still longer continued in Christian writings; and even passed over into Arabic as 'Iliyā'.")

== See also ==
- Alexander of Jerusalem (died 251), bishop of Jerusalem
- Caesarea Maritima, Roman provincial capital after 6 CE
- Gabbatha, biblical name of the place where Pilate tried Jesus
- Names of Jerusalem

== Bibliography ==
Main sources

- Eshel, Hanan (2006). "The Bar Kochba Revolt, 132–135". In Katz, Steven T. (ed.). The Late Roman-Rabbinic Period. The Cambridge History of Judaism. Vol. 4th. Cambridge University Press. ISBN 978-0-521-77248-8.
- Friedman, Mark (1996). "Jewish Pilgrimage after the Destruction of the Second Temple". In Rosovsky, Nitza (ed.). City of the Great King: Jerusalem from David to the Present. Harvard University Press. pp. 136–147. ISBN 978-0-674-36708-1.
- Goodman, Martin (2004). "Trajan and the Origins of Roman Hostility to the Jews". Past & Present (182): 3–29. doi:10.1093/past/182.1.3. JSTOR 3600803.
- Magness, Jodi (2024). Jerusalem Through The Ages: From Its Beginnings To The Crusades. New York, NY: Oxford University Press. ISBN 978-0-19-093780-5.
- Millar, Fergus (2010). "Jerome and Palestine". Scripta Classica Israelica. 29: 59–79.
- Smallwood, E. Mary (1976). The Jews under Roman Rule from Pompey to Diocletian. Brill. doi:10.1163/9789004502048_023. ISBN 978-90-04-50204-8.

Further reading

- Leo Kadman, The Coins of Aelia Capitolina, Jerusalem, 1956
- Benjamin H. Isaac, Roman Colonies in Judaea: the Foundation of Aelia Capitolina, Talanta XII/XIII (1980/81), pp. 31–54
- Ritti, T., Documenti adrianei da Hierapolis di Frigia: le epistole di Adriano alla città, L’Hellénisme d’époque romaine. Nouveaux documents, nouvelles approches (ier s. a.C.–iiie s. p.C.), Paris, 2014, pp. 297–340
- Yaron Z. Eliav, The Urban Layout of Aelia Capitolina: A New View from the Perspective of the Temple Mount, The Bar Kokhba war reconsidered: new perspectives on the second Jewish Revolt, Peter Schäfer (ed.), 2003, pp. 241–277
- Zissu, B., Klein, E., Kloner, A. Settlement Processes in the territorium of Roman Jerusalem (Aelia Capitolina), J. M. Alvarez, T. Nogales, I. Roda (hg.), XVIII CIAC: Centre and Periphery in the Ancient World, Mérida, 2014, pp. 219–223.
- S. Weksler-Bdolah, The Foundation of Aelia Capitolina in Light of New Excavations along the Eastern Cardo, IEJ 64, 2014, pp. 38–62
- B. Isaac,Caesarea-on-the-Sea and Aelia Capitolina: Two Ambiguous Roman Colonies, L’héritage Grec des colonies Romaines d’Orient. Interactions culturelles dans les provinces hellénophones de l’empire romain, C. Brélaz (hg.), Paris, 2017, pp. 331–343.
- Kloner, A., Klein, E., Zissu, B., The Rural Hinterland (territorium) of Aelia Capitolina, G. Avni, G. D. Stiebel (hg.), Roman Jerusalem: A New Old City, Portsmouth, RI, 2017, pp. 131–141.
- Newman, H. I., The Temple Mount of Jerusalem and the Capitolium of Aelia Capitolina, Knowledge and Wisdom: Archaeological and Historical Essays in Honour of Leah Di Segni, G. C. Bottini, L. D. Chrupcała, J. Patrich (hg.), Jerusalem, 2017, pp. 35–42
- A. Bernini, Un riconoscimento di debito redatto a Colonia Aelia Capitolina, Zeitschrift für Papyrologie und Epigraphik 206, 2018, pp. 183–193
- A. Bernini, New Evidence for Colonia Aelia Capitolina (P. Mich. VII 445 + inv. 3888c + inv. 3944k, Proceedings of the 28th International Congress of Papyrology, Barcelona, 2019, pp. 557–562.
- Werner Eck, Die Colonia Aelia Capitolina: Überlegungen zur Anfangsphase der zweiten römischen Kolonie in der Provinz Iudaea-Syria Palaestina, ELECTRUM, Vol. 26 (2019), pp. 129–139
- Miriam Ben Zeev Hofman, Eusebius and Hadrian's Founding of Aelia Capitolina in Jerusalem, ELECTRUM, Vol. 26 (2019), pp. 119–128
- Shlomit Weksler-Bdolah, Aelia Capitolina – Jerusalem in the Roman Period - In Light of Archaeological Research, Mnemosyne, Supplements, History and Archaeology of Classical Antiquity, Volume: 432, Brill, 2020
