= Itinerarium Burdigalense =

4th-century account of a pilgrimage from Bordeaux to the Holy Land

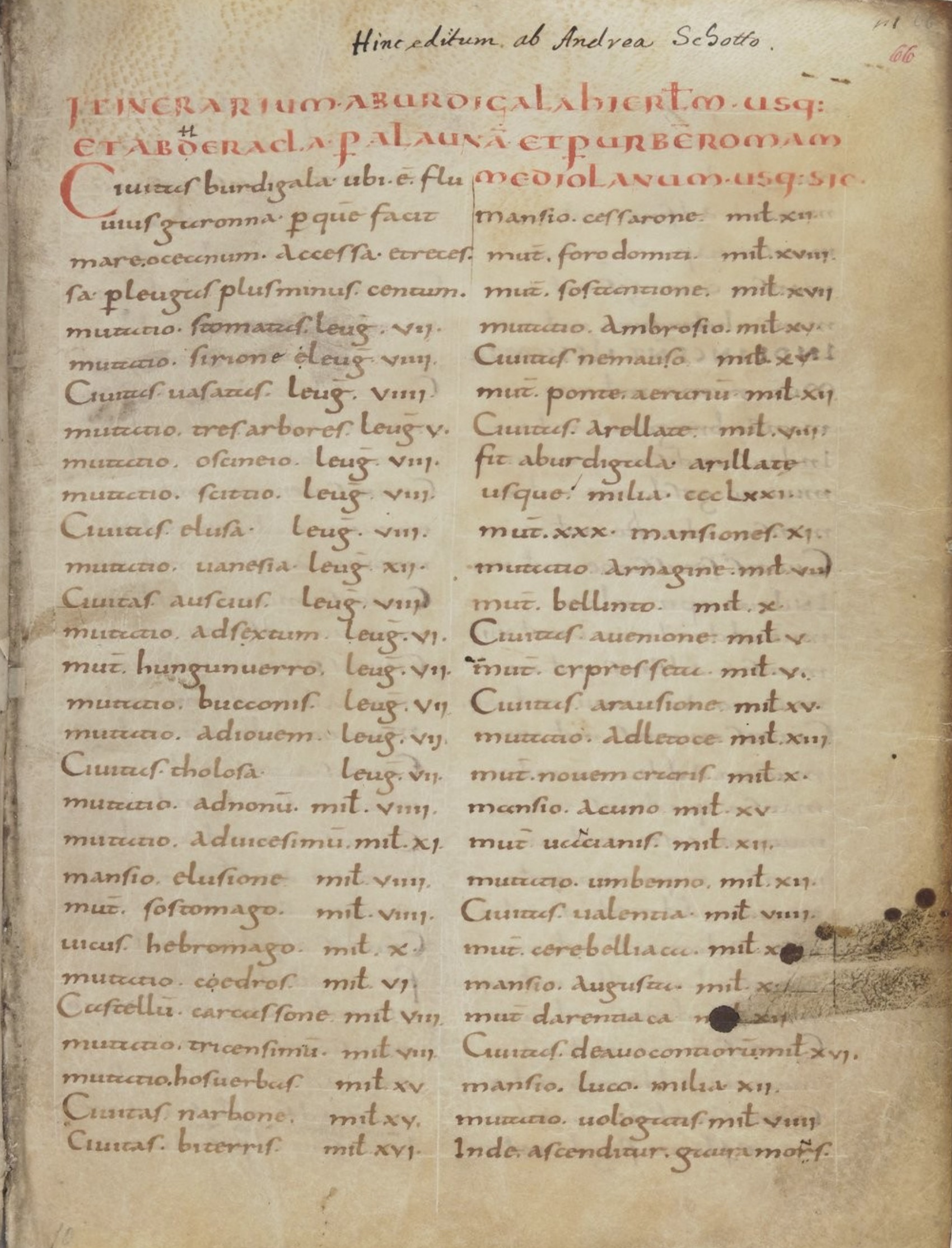
Page of Itinerarium Burdigalense

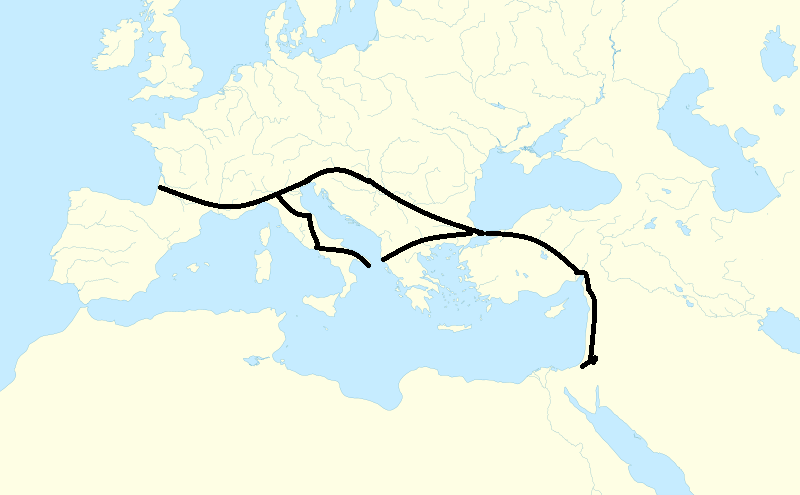
Mapped route of the journey described by an unnamed Christian pilgrim, who travelled from Gallia Aquitania (Southern France) to the Holy Land in the fourth century.

Itinerarium Burdigalense ("Bordeaux Itinerary"), also known as Itinerarium Hierosolymitanum ("Jerusalem Itinerary"), is the oldest known Christian itinerarium. It was written by the "Pilgrim of Bordeaux", an anonymous pilgrim from the city of Burdigala (now Bordeaux, France) in the Roman province of Gallia Aquitania.

It recounts the writer's journey throughout the Roman Empire to the Holy Land in 333 and 334 as he travelled by land through northern Italy and the Danube valley to Constantinople; then through the provinces of Asia and Syria to Jerusalem in the province of Syria-Palaestina; and then back by way of Macedonia, Otranto, Rome, and Milan.

== Interpretation and analysis ==
According to the Catholic Encyclopedia, the report is a dry enumeration of the cities through which the writer passed and the places where he stopped or changed horses, with their respective distances. For the Holy Land he also briefly notes the important events which he believes to be connected with the various places. Here he makes some "strange blunders", as when he places the Transfiguration on Mount Olivet. His description of Jerusalem, though short, contains information of great value for the topography of the city.

Jaś Elsner notes that twenty-one years after Constantine legalized Christianity, "the Holy Land to which the pilgrim went had to be entirely reinvented in those years, since its main site – ancient Jerusalem – had been sacked under the Emperor Hadrian and refounded as Aelia Capitolina." Elsner found to his surprise "how swiftly a Christian author was willing implicitly to re-arrange and redefine deeply entrenched institutional norms, while none the less writing on an entirely traditional model [i.e., the established Greco-Roman genre of travel writing]."

The compiler of the itinerary cites the boundaries from one Roman province to the next and distinguishes between each change of horses (mutatio) and stopover place (mansio). He also differentiates between simple clusters of habitations (vicus) and the fortress (castellum) or city (civitas). The segments of the journey are summarised; they are delineated by major cities, with major summaries at Rome and Milan, long-established centers of culture and administration, and Constantinople, refounded by Constantine only three years previously, and the "non-city" of Jerusalem.

Glenn Bowman argues that it is a carefully structured work relating profoundly to Old and New Biblical dispensations via the medium of water and baptism imagery.

Some scholars of early Christianity maintain that the book is not a first-person account of a Christian pilgrimage to Byzantine Palestine but a collection of secondhand stories compiled by someone living in Bordeaux.

== Manuscripts ==
The Itinerarium survives in four manuscripts, all written between the 8th and 10th centuries. Two give only the Judean portion of the trip, which is fullest in topographical glosses on the sites, in a range of landscape detail missing from the other sections, and Christian legend.

== See also ==
- Eusebius of Caesarea, Church historian and geographer of the Holy Land
- Egeria, pilgrim to the Holy Land (c. 381–384)
- St Jerome, Bible translator
- Madaba Map
- Antoninus of Piacenza (pilgrim)
- Chronicon Paschale, 7th-century Greek Christian chronicle of the world
- Arculf, pilgrim to the Holy Land
- John of Würzburg, pilgrim to the Holy Land
- Symon Semeonis, 14th-century Irish pilgrim to the Holy Land
