= St Helen's Chapel, Colchester =

St. Helen's Chapel
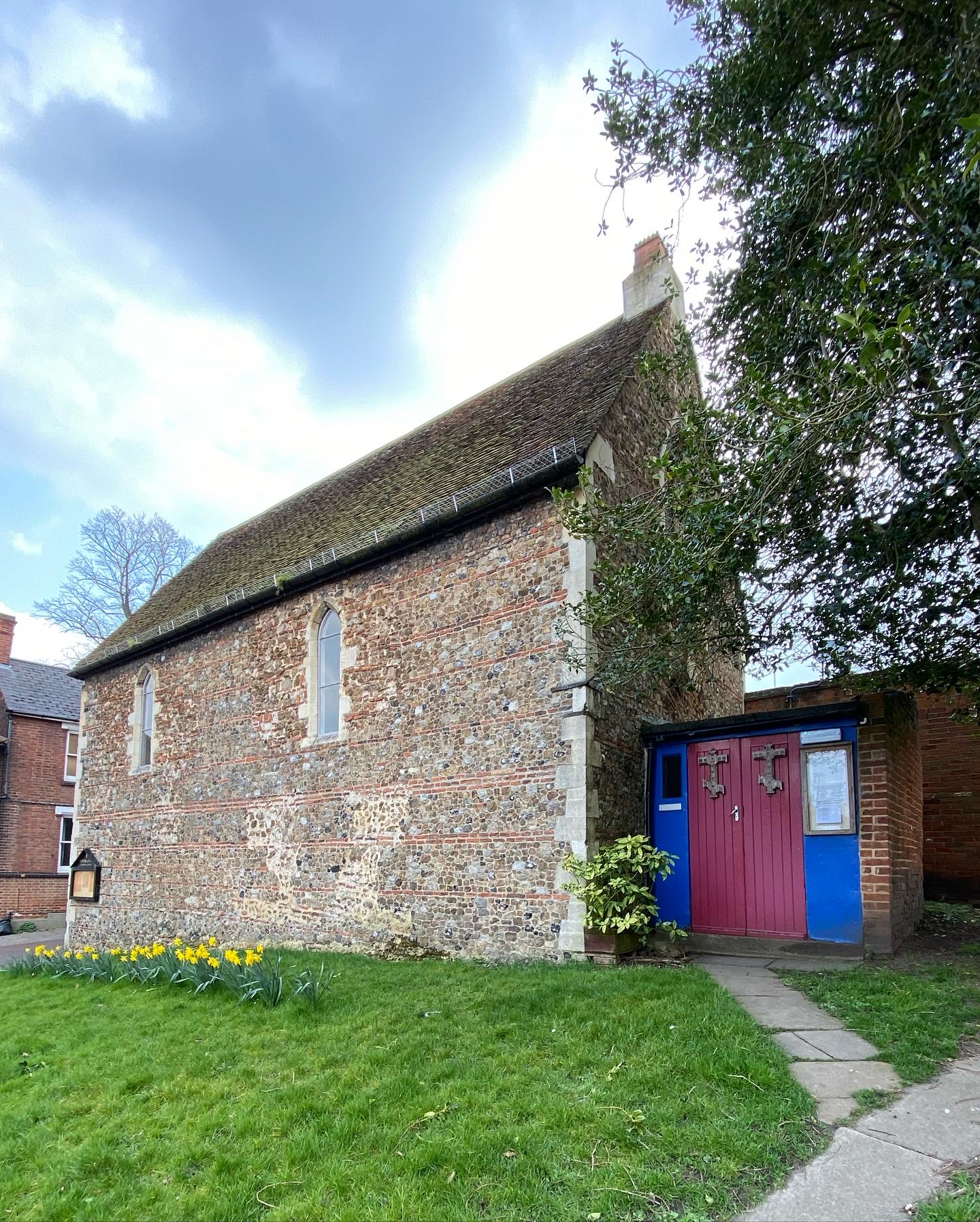
- St. Helen's Chapel
- 51.891°N 0.901°E
- Location: Colchester, Essex
- Country: England
- Language: English
- Denomination: Greek Orthodox Church of Antioch
- Previous denomination: Church of England

Administration
- Archdiocese: Archdiocese of the British Isles and Ireland

St Helen's Chapel is an Eastern Orthodox church in Colchester, Essex, under the jurisdiction of the Antiochian Orthodox Christian Archdiocese of the British Isles and Ireland, headed by Metropolitan Silouan Oner.

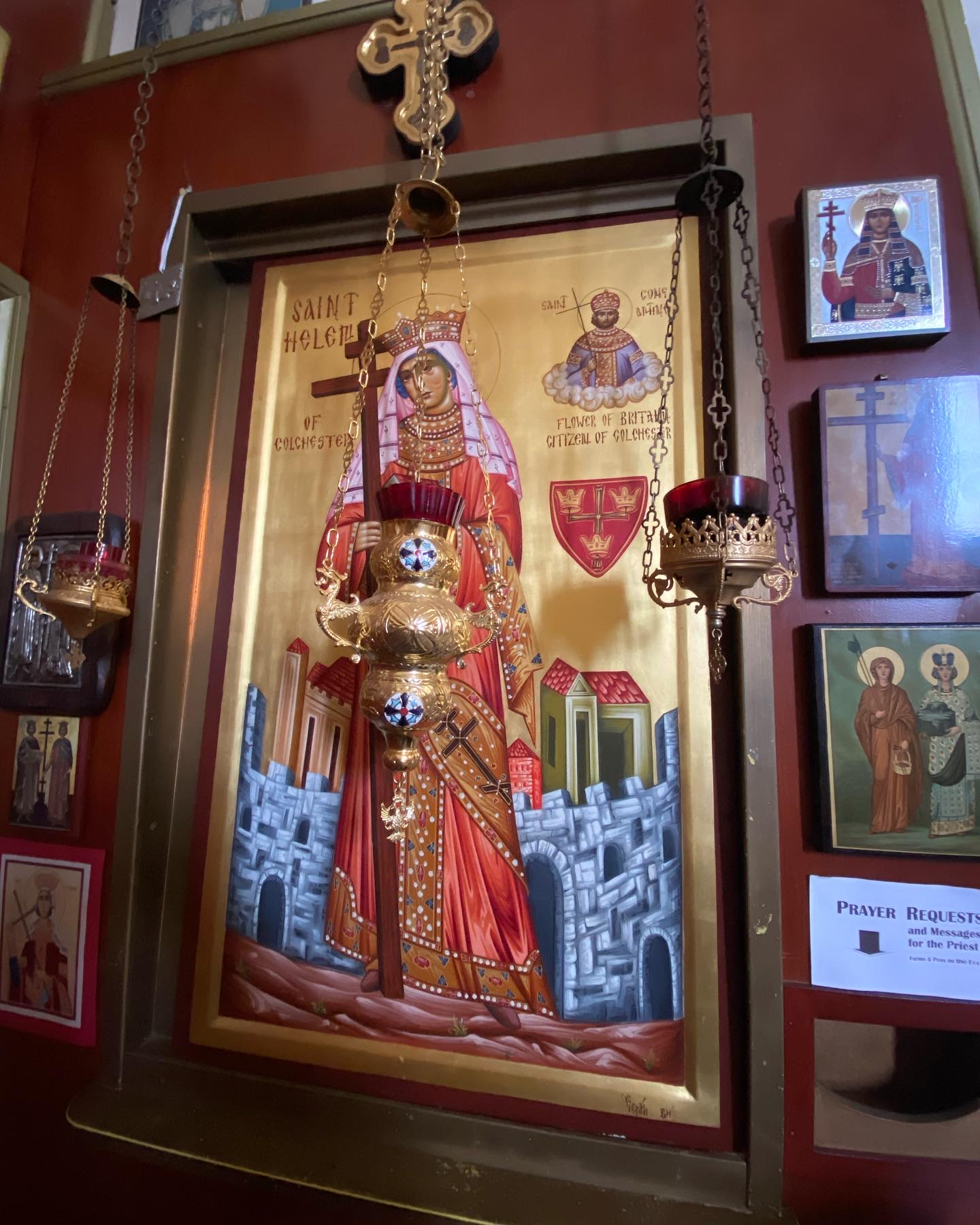
The Icon of Saint Helen of Colchester inside of the Chapel

== Liturgy ==
Divine Liturgy at Saint Helen's Chapel is prayed in the English language, usually on weekdays. Sunday Divine Liturgy now takes place at St Martin's Church.

== History ==
In the 16th century, after the Protestant Reformation, St Helen's Chapel ceased to be used for worship and instead was used for secular use as a school, library, and workshop. In the 18th century, the chapel began to be used as a Quaker meeting house and later a Church Hall. In 1886, the Round family, who also owned Colchester Castle, purchased the chapel, and hired famous architect William Butterfield to restore it. Very little of the original stonework exists, excluding a few decorative Roman bricks.

Since the 24th of February 1950, the chapel has been Grade II listed on the National Heritage List for England.

In 2000, after 500 years, the chapel was restored by the local Eastern Orthodox parish to be used for Divine Liturgy.
