= Our Lady of Sion School =

Location
- Gratwicke Road; Worthing, West Sussex, BN11 4BL; England
- 50.813°N 0.3771°W

Information
- Type: Private day school
- Motto: Consideration Always
- Religious affiliation: Inter-denominational
- Established: 1862
- Department for Education URN: 126115 Tables
- Headteacher: Steven Jeffery
- Gender: Coeducational
- Age: 3 to 18
- Enrolment: 560~
- Colour: Maroon
- Publication: The Sionian
- Former pupils: Old Sionians
- Website: http://www.sionschool.org.uk

Our Lady of Sion School is an inter-denominational, independent school for male and female students, founded in 1862 and located in Worthing, West Sussex, on the south coast of England.

Based on the teachings of Theodor Ratisbonne and Alphonse Ratisbonne, the school is part of a worldwide network of schools founded by the Sisters of Sion. Other Sion Schools can be found in Australia, Canada, Brazil, Costa Rica, France, Turkey, and the United States. The Senior School is situated partially upon the site of the original convent, whilst the Junior School, a conversion of a large Victorian home, is located three roads away.

The school's current Headteacher is Mr Steven Jeffery. The school motto is Consideration Always.

== History ==
=== The Ratisbonne Brothers ===
Marie Theodor Ratisbonne, born in 1802, was a French Jewish convert to the Catholic Church, born into a wealthy Jewish banking family in Strasbourg. His younger brother Marie-Alphonse Ratisbonne was born in 1814. Two of thirteen children, their father, Auguste Ratisbonne served as President of the Provincial Council of Alsace.

Hailing from a background of great wealth and prosperity, the Ratisbonne family were notable members of society. The Ratisbonne family were assimilated into the secular society of France, but played an active role in the "regeneration" of the Jewish people, through education of the poor. Nonetheless, resultant of their assimilation to French society, religious practice did not play a significant part of the family's life.

Despite his education at the Royal College of Strasbourg fostering a more academic rather than religious upbringing, Theodor was drawn to religion. Religion was "repugnant" to him, both his own religion "and all other religions" too. At the age of 22, following the conversion of many friends, including Emile Dreyfus, Alfred Mayer and Samson Liebermann to Christianity, Theodor spent two years under the guidance of a local Catholic catechist named Louise Humann, studying both Hebrew scriptures and the New Testament.

Through his embrace of Christianity, Theodor joined a wave of conversions then taking place in the French Jewish community, triggered by a sense that the Jews could not achieve full integration in French society as long as they remained Jews. He had reached the conclusion that there was a fundamental incompatibility between Judaism and French citizenship. Until his conversion, he was active in the Societe d'Encouragement au Travail en Faveur des Israelites du Bas-Rhin (Society for the Advancement of the Israelites of the Lower Rhine). He later felt that this involvement in Jewish communal affairs was a preparatory step to his baptism.

Theodor was subsequently baptized in 1826. In 1830, following his ordainment as a priest, he was rejected by his family, including by his brother Alphonse. Greatly upset by his brother's conversion, Alphonse developed a "profound hatred" for the Catholic Church. Following the death of their mother, Adelaide Cerfbeer, in 1808, Alphonse was raised by the wider family and his uncle chose him as the successor to his bank. After studying law in Paris, Alphonse joined the family bank and announced his engagement to his 16-year-old niece, Flore.

Theodor was made a Knight of the Order of St. Sylvester in 1842 by Pope Gregory XVI. Much of his work was focused upon helping other Jews convert to Christianity. He saw his Jewish heritage as the basis for his faith as a Catholic. On 20 January 1842, during a pleasure trip to Rome in preparation for his marriage, Alphonse entered the Church of Sant'Andrea delle Fratte, in which he experienced a vision of the Virgin Mary, an event that led to his conversion to Catholicism:

“As I walked about the church… there seemed to be one chapel where all the light was concentrated. Raising my eyes to the chapel, I saw standing on the altar, tall, vibrant, majestic, full of beauty and mercy, the Blessed Virgin Mary as she is represented on the Miraculous Medal of the Immaculate Conception.

At this sight I fell on my knees on the spot where I had been standing; several times I tried to raise my eyes to the Blessed Virgin, but her radiance and my feeling of respect made me lower them; this did not prevent me, however, from being very aware of the apparition. I fixed my eyes on her hands, and in them I saw evidence of pardon and mercy. In the presence of the Blessed Virgin Mary, although she did not utter a word, I understood the horror of the state of my soul, the hideousness of sin, the beauty of the Catholic religion; in a word, I understood everything."

=== Creation of the Congregation of Our Lady of Sion ===
Upon his baptism, he added Marie to his name. Upon his arrival home, his fiancée rejected his newfound faith and Alphonse entered the Jesuits, being ordained in 1848. Theodor then established a school in 1843 for Jewish children in a Christian setting. Two Jewish sisters came to the school for spiritual advice and were converted, forming the nucleus of the congregation that was to come.

In 1852, together the Ratisbonne brothers established the Congregation of the Fathers of Our Lady of Sion. In 1858, Alphonse opened an orphanage and vocational school down the thoroughfare of Via Dolorosa, in Jerusalem, Ottoman Empire, establishing the Convent of the Sisters of Zion. He purchased many surrounding Arab houses and incorporated the Church of Ecce Homo.

=== Arrival in Worthing ===
Having taught in France and the Holy Land, in 1860, at the invitation of Cardinal Manning, the Sisters arrived in England and settled in Worthing, West Sussex, approximately 500m from the coastline. A school was opened in 1862. Built alongside the convent was the Church of St Mary of the Angels, Worthing, the design of which is attributable to Henry Clutton. Within the convent a chapel was constructed, which remains to this day as part of the school. The old convent floor is marbled, with a symmetrical mosaic pattern running down the hallway, culminating in a circular mosaic pattern. Through the corridor, the "Dutch garden" can be seen through the sash windows.

Upon the site, the Sisters ran three schools; a convent, which became the present school; a "poor school" which provided free education for orphans under the care of the Sisters and local children whose parents could not afford to pay; and St Elizabeth's, a fee-paying school on Crescent Road for boys up until the age of eight and girls up until the school-leaving age. During the 20th century, the convent school was taught by the Sisters, but over the years an increasing number of lay teachers were employed. The last teaching nun retired in 1999. Every year, the school awards the "Sister Una" award to a member of the Upper Sixth Form whom it is felt best represents the values of Sion and its motto "consideration always".

In preparation for the hundredth anniversary, in 1962, the school was dramatically expanded by the construction of a new senior school block. The original convent is now a Grade-II listed building, as too is the adjacent church.

From 1983, under the stewardship of the first lay Headmaster Brian Sexton, the school began to admit boys into the Sixth Form and eventually expanded into all years. In 2000, Michael Scullion became Headmaster until his retirement in 2015. The school celebrated its 150th anniversary in 2012. Dr Simon Orchard was Headmaster from 2015 until 2020. The current Headteacher, Mr Steven Jefferey was appointed in February 2021.

== The School Today ==
The school consistently performs well academically, achieving 43% Grade A*-A and 98% Grade A-C in A-level results in 2017. A 2016 review by the Independent Schools Inspectorate rated the school "excellent" for the quality of pupils' personal development and "good" for the quality of pupils' academic achievement.

In February 2022, the school became the first school in the country to have a fully vegan school kitchen serving vegan school meals created through a partnership with Plant Based School Kitchens. The decision to serve vegan school dinners was made in consultation with students and parents and was chosen as the most inclusive and conscious option for hot meals. School dinners include Fillet Fisch burger with tartare sauce & chips, butternut squash & sweet potato Tikka Masala with rice, and tofu tacos with Asian slaw.

== Other Sion Schools ==
Whilst all schools are independent of each other, they are linked through the shared values of the Ratisbonnes and maintain links with the Congregation of Sion. Many participate in an international exchange program, however Our Lady of Sion does not.

- Our Lady of Sion College, Australia
- Catholic College Sale, Australia
- École Bilingue Notre Dame de Sion - St-Laurent, Canada
- Colégio Nossa Senhora de Sion, Curitiba, Brazil
- Colégio Nossa Senhora de Sion, Higienopolis, Brazil
- Escola São Teodoro de Nossa Senhora de Sion, Brazil
- Colégio Sion, Brazil
- Colegio Nuestra Señora de Sion, San Jose, Costa Rica
- Colegio Nuestra Señora de Sion, Turrialba, Costa Rica
- Collège et Lycée Notre Dame de Sion, France
- Notre-Dame de Sion in Paris, France
- Notre-Dame de Sion in Saint Omer, France
- Notre-Dame de Sion in Strasbourg, France
- Notre-Dame de Sion in Marseille, France
- Collège Notre Dame de Sion in Grenoble, France
- Lycée Notre Dame de Sion Istanbul, Turkey
- Notre Dame de Sion School of Kansas City, USA
- St. Maurice School, Winnipeg, Canada

== Old Sionians ==
- Noah Huntley, actor
- Roxanne McKee, actress
- Alex Coomber, athlete
- Nuala Quinn-Barton, film-producer
