= Ratisbonne (disambiguation) =

Ratisbonne and Ratisbon are the French and English alternative names for Regensburg, a city in south-east Germany. Ratisbonne and Ratisbon may also refer to:

- Battle of Ratisbon (1809), also called the Battle of Regensburg, a battle fought during the Napoleonic Wars
- Ratisbonne Monastery, a monastery in Jerusalem
- Treaty of Ratisbonne (1630), also known as Peace Treaty of Regensburg, a peace treaty following the War of the Mantuan Succession

== People ==
- Andreas of Ratisbon (14th–15th century), Bavarian historian
- Berthold of Ratisbon (13th century), Franciscan of the monastery of Ratisbon
- Louis Ratisbonne (1827–1900), a French man of letters
- The Ratisbonne Brothers, brothers who converted from Judaism to Catholicism
  - Marie-Alphonse Ratisbonne (1814-1884), a French Jew who converted to Catholicism and became a Jesuit Catholic priest and missionary
  - Marie-Théodor Ratisbonne (1802–1884), a French Jewish convert to Catholicism who became a priest and missionary

== See also ==
- Regensburg (disambiguation)
