= 1922–23 Maccabi Jerusalem F.C. season =

Maccabi Jerusalem
1922–23 season

The 1922–23 season was Maccabi Jerusalem's 12th season since its establishment in 1911. As the local football association wasn't founded until July 1928, there were no officially organized competitions during the season, and the club played only friendly matches.

== Overview ==
After a period of over a year of inactivity, the club was re-organized in July 1923, with several clubs becoming affiliated to the Maccabi organization in Jerusalem. The Maccabi organization set up a 6-team league, which was designed to be played between July and October 1923. However, the league was stopped after several weeks in order to reorganize the competition.

== Known matches ==
The following is a list of matches played by Maccabi affiliated teams during the season.

Date	Venue	Team 1	Result	Team 2	Notes
9 June 1923	Ratisbonne	Kadima	5–1	Jerusalem Sports Club	
16 June 1923		Kadima B	2–0	HaTzvi B	Abandoned during the 2nd half
16 June 1923		Kadima	0–2	RAF	
30 June 1923		HaTzvi	4–10	RAF	
7 July 1923		Hor	0–0	Kadima	
7 July 1923		HaGibor	1–3	RAF	
14 July 1923		Kadima	5–1	HaGibor	
14 July 1923		HaTzvi	2–1	Hor	
28 July 1923		HaGibor	2–1	Hor	Jerusalem League
28 July 1923		Kadima	2–1	HaTzvi	Jerusalem League
