= St Mary of the Angels, Worthing =

Roman Catholic church in West Sussex, England

Church of St Mary of the Angels, Worthing
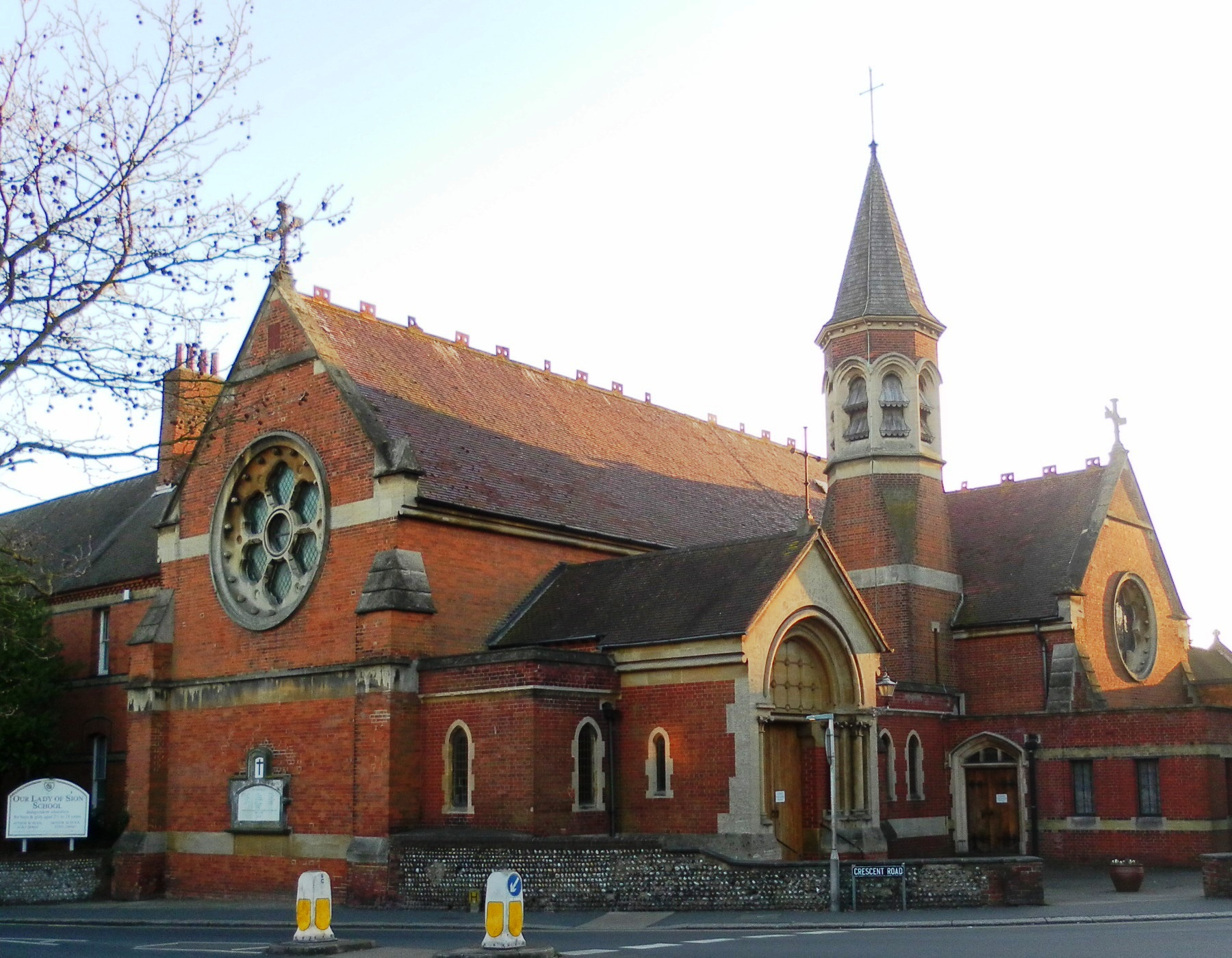
- The church from the northeast
- Church of St Mary of the Angels, Worthing
- 50.8132°N 0.3773°W
- Denomination: Roman Catholic

History
- Status: Parish church
- Dedication: Saint Mary
- Consecrated: 1864

Architecture
- Functional status: Active
- Heritage designation: Grade II
- Designated: 21 May 1976
- Architect(s): Henry Clutton; Frederick Walters
- Architectural type: Church
- Style: French Gothic Revival
- Completed: 1864

Administration
- Province: Southwark
- Diocese: Arundel & Brighton
- Deanery: Worthing

Clergy
- Priest: Fr Ireneusz Stadler

The Church of St Mary of the Angels, Worthing, is in Worthing, West Sussex, England. It is a Grade II listed building and the earliest of the four Roman Catholic churches in Worthing. It is an active Roman Catholic parish church in the diocese of Arundel & Brighton and the Worthing deanery.

== History ==
The Church of St Mary of the Angels was opened by Thomas Grant, Roman Catholic bishop of Southwark, the first local Roman Catholic bishop since the Reformation.

The church was built on land bought by Thomas Gaisford, owner of Offington Hall in Broadwater. Previously Gaisford had allowed the new chapel he had built at Offington Hall to be used by the public from 1859. Gaisford had previously married the Catholic Lady Emily St Lawrence, daughter of Thomas St Lawrence, 3rd Earl of Howth and Lady Emily de Burgh. The church was the first place of Catholic worship in Worthing.

The church was built with the Our Lady of Sion convent adjacent to the church. The convent is run by the Sisters of Sion, who also founded the nearby independent school Our Lady of Sion School. The church lies at the corner of Richmond Road and Crescent Road, close to the triumphal arch of Park Crescent.

== Architecture ==
Originally designed by Henry Clutton in the style of French Gothic revival with an exterior built of red brick with Portland stone, the church was extended by Frederick Walters in 1897-1907 to include a baptistery and an extension to the porch and sacristy. The church contains a 76-foot-tall (23 m) bell tower with a miniature spire.
