= 1920–21 in Mandatory Palestine football =

Football in Mandatory Palestine
- Season: 1920–21

The following article is a summary of the 1920–21 football in Mandatory Palestine. As the local football association wasn't founded until July 1928, there were no officially organized competitions during the season.

== Overview ==
Following its occupation by British troops in 1917–1918, Palestine was governed by the Occupied Enemy Territory Administration. In July 1920, the military administration was replaced by a civilian administration headed by a High Commissioner, allowing civil life to resume following the aftermath of The Great War. Maccabi societies resumed activities in several cities and settlements, including Jerusalem, Tel Aviv, Petah Tikva and Hadera. In Jerusalem, the Jerusalem Sports Club was established by the British in April 1921.

== Known matches ==
As no governing body existed at the time, and with limited possibilities for travel, the football sections of the Jerusalem and Tel Aviv societies played matches, mostly against teams of British soldiers stationed in the vicinity, played mostly between January and March 1921. Following the Jaffa riots in May 1921, footballing activity stopped, except for one match, played on 25 May 1921.

| Date | Venue | Home | Away | Result | Notes |
|---|---|---|---|---|---|
| 25 September 1920 | Ratisbonne Ground | Maccabi Jerusalem | Yorkshire Regiment | 0–0 | |
| 20 November 1920 | Ratisbonne Ground | Maccabi Jerusalem | Red Cross | 0–2 | |
| 21 January 1921 | Badrani Field | Maccabi Tel Aviv | Cavalry regiment, Sarona | 3–0 | |
| 28 January 1921 | Sarona Ground | Cavalry regiment, Sarona | Maccabi Tel Aviv | 1–2 | |
| 4 February 1921 | Ajami Sports Ground | Christian-Muslim Club | Maccabi Tel Aviv | 0–5 | |
| 5 February 1921 | Ratisbonne Ground | Maccabi Jerusalem | Lancashire Reginment | 2–1 | Goals for Maccabi: Itzhak Melamed, Peretz Kornfeld |
| 12 February 1921 | Ratisbonne Ground | Maccabi Jerusalem | Lancashire Reginment | 4–6 | First goal for Maccabi: Itzhak Melamed |
| 12 March 1921 | Sarona Ground | British Army Officers | Maccabi Tel Aviv | n/a | The result wasn't given, Maccabi Tel Aviv won. |
| 16 April 1921 | Ratisbonne Ground | Maccabi Jerusalem | Maccabi Tel Aviv | 0–4 | |
| 25 May 1921 | Badrani Field | Maccabi Tel Aviv | Iron Duke XI | n/a | The result wasn't given, Iron Duke won. |

== Notable events ==
- During a youth football match between students from Mikveh Israel and Hebrew Gymnasium, a student from Kfar Tavor, learning in Mikveh Israel, sustained a fatal blow to the chest and died before help arrived.
- On 5 May 1921, during the 1921 Jaffa riots, Maccabi Petah Tikva member Avshalom Gissin was killed by Arab assailants as he was defending Petah Tikva. The club was renamed after Gissin, adopting the name Maccabi Avshalom Petah Tikva.
