= 1920–21 Maccabi Jerusalem F.C. season =

Maccabi Jerusalem
1920–21 season
- Stadium: Ratisbonne Ground

The 1920–21 season was Maccabi Jerusalem's 10th season since its establishment, in 1911. As the local football association wasn't founded until July 1928, there were no officially organized competitions during the season, and the club played only friendly matches.

== Overview ==
Following its occupation by British troops in 1917–1918, Palestine was governed by the Occupied Enemy Territory Administration. In July 1920, the military administration was replaced by a civilian administration headed by a High Commissioner, allowing civil life to resume following the aftermath of The Great War. Maccabi societies resumed activities in several cities and settlements, including in Jerusalem.

== Known Matches ==
As no governing body existed at the time, and with limited possibilities for travel, the football sections of the Jerusalem and Tel Aviv societies played matches, mostly against teams of British soldiers stationed in the vicinity, played mostly between January and March 1921. Following the Jaffa riots in May 1921, footballing activity stopped, except for one match, played on 25 May 1921.

| Date | Opponent | Venue | Result | Scorers |
|---|---|---|---|---|
| 25 September 1920 | Yorkshire Regiment | Ratisbonne Ground | 0–0 | |
| 20 November 1920 | Red Cross | Ratisbonne Ground | 0–2 | |
| 5 February 1921 | Lancashire Reginment | Ratisbonne Ground | 2–1 | Itzhak Melamed, Peretz Kornfeld |
| 12 February 1921 | Lancashire Reginment | Ratisbonne Ground | 4–6 | Itzhak Melamed, unknown (3 goals) |
| 16 April 1921 | Maccabi Tel Aviv | Ratisbonne Ground | 0–4 | |
