= 1921–22 in Mandatory Palestine football =

Football in Mandatory Palestine
- Season: 1921–22

The following article is a summary of the 1921–22 football in Mandatory Palestine. As the local football association wasn't founded until July 1928, there were no officially organized competitions during the season.

== Overview ==
During the season there was little activity with only a handful of matches being played or reported. However, football began to spread throughout the country, being played between schoolboys on field trips, such as a match played in Rishon LeZion between the local Scouts branch and visiting Scouts from Ramla and a match played in Safed between the visiting pupils of Hebrew Reali School and local Arab pupils, which resulted in a 4–1 win for the Reali. In Haifa the manager of the Train Depot arranged an inter-departmental cup match, which needed extra time to be settled.

== Known matches ==
As no governing body existed at the time, and with limited possibilities for travel, the football sections of the Jerusalem and Tel Aviv societies played matches, mostly against teams of British soldiers stationed in the vicinity. Several matches were reported as they were to be played, but no result was given for the match afterwards, and it is not known if the matches were played.

Date	Venue	Home	Away	Result	Notes
15 October 1921	Ratisbonne Ground	Maccabi Jerusalem	Lancashire Regiment	2–3	
31 December 1921	Select Ground	H.E.I. (British Army)	Maccabi Tel Aviv	1–3	
4 February 1922	Rec. Ground	Jerusalem Sports Club	Maccabi Tel Aviv	4–2	
