= Emmanuelle Cinquin =

Catholic religious sister

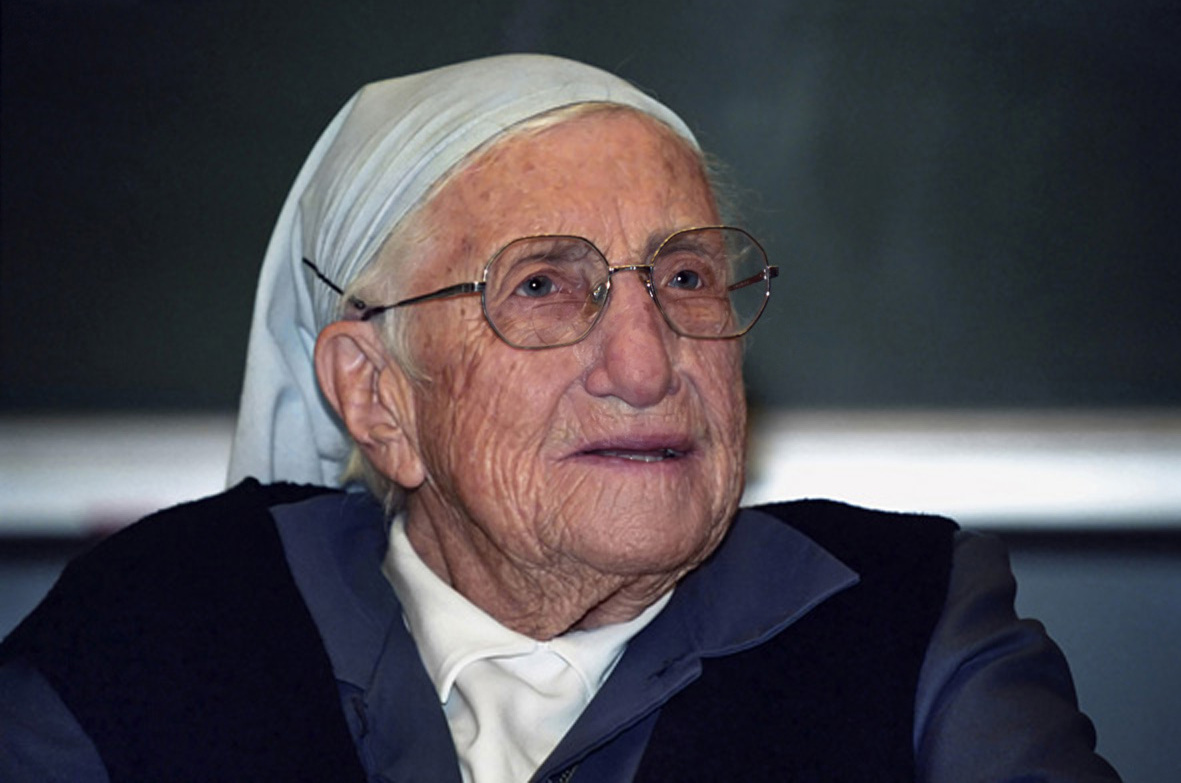
- Emmanuelle in 2003
- Born: Madeleine Cinquin; 16 November 1908; Brussels, Belgium
- Died: 20 October 2008 (aged 99); Callian, Var, France
- Occupations: Catholic religious sister; human rights worker

Emmanuelle Cinquin NDS (French pronunciation: [emanɥɛl sɛ̃kɛ̃]; born Madeleine Cinquin; 16 November 1908 – 20 October 2008), widely known as Sœur Emmanuelle ("Sister Emmanuel"), was a Catholic religious sister of both Belgian and French origins, noted for her involvement in working for the plight of the poor in Turkey and Egypt. She was honoured with Egyptian citizenship in 1991.

== Life ==
Madeleine Cinquin was born in Brussels, Belgium, the daughter of a French father, Jules Cinquin, and a Belgian mother, Berthe Lenssens. Her parents were wealthy lingerie manufacturers; their background was from Saint-Omer. Her paternal grandmother, Laure Mélanie Dreyfus, was the daughter of an Alsatian Jew named Emmanuel Moïse Augustin Dreyfus and a Christian mother. He was born in Wissembourg, Bas-Rhin, and started the family lingerie business. At the age of six she saw her father drown.

Madeleine Cinquin was educated at the Sorbonne, earning a degree in philosophy. In 1929, she became a religious sister in the Congregation of Our Lady of Sion, where she took the religious name Emanuelle. In the 1930s, Sr. Emmanuelle started teaching at the Notre-Dame de Sion High School in Istanbul, where she lived until the 1960s, with teaching assignments by her congregation of several years in Tunis and Alexandria in between.

In 1971, Sr. Emmanuelle witnessed the impoverished conditions of the trash collectors in Cairo, Egypt, and decided to live among them. Reflecting on this action, Pope Leo XIV sees her as an example of those who have "discovered that the poorest are not only objects of our compassion, but teachers of the Gospel. It is not a question of 'bringing' God to them, but of encountering [God] among them." She remained in Egypt until 1993, when she returned to France. It was upon her return that she gained the status of a media sensation in France, as she was well received by audiences and talk-show hosts.

In addition to her charity work, she was known for her unorthodox religious views, including her approval of the use of contraception and of the idea of allowing priests to marry. She was voted one of the most popular people in both France and Belgium, and was compared to Mother Teresa, although she herself regarded the comparison as "ridiculous". In 2003, a French television station broadcast the documentary, Soeur Emmanuelle: An Exceptional Woman. In 2005 Sr. Emmanuelle ended in fifth place in the Walloon version of Le plus grand Belge (The Greatest Belgian).

Sr. Emmanuelle died on 20 October 2008, in Callian, Var, in France. She died in her sleep from natural causes, less than four weeks from celebrating her 100th birthday.

== Honors ==
Les Amis de Soeur Emmanuelle ("The Friends of Sister Emmanuelle") is a charitable organization based in Brussels.

French Singer Calogero dedicated a song to her named "Yalla", which means "move on, move forward" in Arabic, something she was famous for saying. The song was sung to her for her 98th birthday.

In 2018, for the 10th anniversary of her death, the city of Paris decided to name a street after her. The Allée Soeur-Emmanuelle is situated on the boulevard Raspail, between the allée Claude-Cahun-Marcel-Moore and the boulevard du Montparnasse, where are the headquarters of Congregation of Our Lady of Sion.

== Writings ==
=== Works written by Sœur Emmanuelle ===
- Sœur Emmanuelle (pref. Jean-Marie Cavada), Chiffonnière avec les chiffonniers, ’Chiffonniere with ragpickers’, Ivry-sur-Seine, Éditions de l'Atelier, 1989 and 2007 (ISBN 978-2-7082-3900-5)
- Sœur Emmanuelle, Une vie avec les pauvres, ‘A life with the poor’, Paris, Éditions de l'Atelier, 1991 (ISBN 978-2-7082-2897-9)
- Sœur Emmanuelle, Yalla, en avant les jeunes, Paris, LGF - Livre de Poche, 1999 (ISBN 978-2-253-14567-7)
- Sœur Emmanuelle, Les Mots du Rosaire, ‘The words of the Rosary’, Arles, Actes Sud, 2001 (ISBN 978-2-7427-3442-9)
- Sœur Emmanuelle, Un pauvre a crié, le Seigneur l'écoute, ‘A poor man shouted, the Lord listened’, Paray-le-Monial, Emmanuel, 2005 (ISBN 978-2-915313-50-5)
- Sœur Emmanuelle, Vivre, à quoi ça sert ?, ‘Living, what is the purpose?’, Paris, J'ai lu, 2005, 149 p. (ISBN 978-2-290343-66-1)
- Sœur Emmanuelle, Agenda 2009. Une année avec Sœur Emmanuelle, Presses de la Renaissance, 21 August 2008 (ISBN 978-2-7509-0436-4)
- Sœur Emmanuelle, 365 Méditations de Sœur Emmanuelle, Paris, Presses de la Renaissance, 9 October 2008 (ISBN 978-2-7509-0435-7)
- Sœur Emmanuelle, Je Te Salue Marie, ‘I hail you, Mary’, Bordeaux, Elytis, 15 October 2008 (ISBN 978-2-35639-007-3)
- Sœur Emmanuelle, Les Confessions d'une religieuse, ‘The confessions of a religious woman’, Flammarion, 23 October 2008 (ISBN 978-2-08-212519-2)

=== Works written in collaboration with Sœur Emmanuelle ===
- Sofia Stril-Rever et Matthieu Ricard (pref. Sœur Emmanuelle), Enfants du Tibet : De cœur à cœur avec Jetsun Pema et Sœur Emmanuelle, ‘Children of Tibet : from heart to heart' with Jetsun Pema and Sœur Emmanuelle, Desclée de Brouwer, 2000 (ISBN 978-2-220-04810-9)
- Sœur Emmanuelle et Edmond Blattschen, L'Évangile des chiffonniers, ‘The Gospel of Ragpickers’, Bruxelles, Alice, 2000 (ISBN 978-2-930182-30-8)
- Sœur Emmanuelle et Philippe Asso, Richesse de la pauvreté, ‘The wealth of poverty’, Paris, Flammarion, 2001 (ISBN 978-2-08-210054-0)
- Sœur Emmanuelle et Marlène Tuininga, Jésus tel que je le connais, ‘Jesus as I know him’, Paris, J'ai lu, 2003 (ISBN 978-2-290-32873-6)
- Sœur Emmanuelle et Philippe Asso, Vivre, à quoi ça sert ?, ‘Living, what is the purpose?’, Paris, Flammarion, 2004 (ISBN 978-2-08-210341-1)
- Sœur Emmanuelle et Marlène Tuininga, Le Paradis, c'est les autres, ‘Paradise is the others ‘, Paris, J'ai lu, 1995 (ISBN 978-2-290-34315-9)
- Sœur Emmanuelle et Sofia Stril-Rever, La Folie d'Amour. Entretiens avec sœur Emmanuelle, ‘The Madness of Love. Interviews with Sister Emmanuelle ‘, Flammarion, 2005 (ISBN 978-2-08-210528-6)
- Jacques Duquesne, Annabelle Cayrol et Sœur Emmanuelle, J'ai 100 ans et je voudrais vous dire…, ‘I’m 100 years old and I would like to say to you…’, Plon, 20 August 2008 (ISBN 978-2-259-20921-2)
- Sofia Stril-Rever, Mon testament spirituel: De Sœur Emmanuelle, ‘My Spiritual Testament: of Sœur Emmanuelle’, Paris, Presses de la Renaissance, 2008 (ISBN 978-2-7509-0489-0)

=== Works dedicated to Sœur Emmanuelle ===
- Pierre Lunel (pref. Bernard Kouchner), Sœur Emmanuelle, la biographie, Paris, Anne Carrière, 2006 (ISBN 978-2-84337-364-0)
- Sœur Emmanuelle, Mille et Un bonheurs : Méditations de Sœur Emmanuelle, Paris, Carnets Nord, 2007 (ISBN 978-2-35536-004-6)
- Documentaire Sœur Emmanuelle, le cœur et l'esprit (réalisé par Elisabeth Kapnist) - diffusé sur France 5 en 2007.
- Spectacle de Pierrette Dupoyet intitulé "L'Amour plus fort que la mort ou une Fleur chez les chiffonniers" (création Festival d'Avignon 1997)- texte paru aux Éditions La Traverse année 1999 (Show by Pierrette Dupoyet entitled "Love stronger than death or a flower among the ragpickers" –for the Avignon Festival 1997- Text published in Éditions La Traverse année 1999 (ISSN 1262-3423)
- Fabell chante Sœur Emmanuelle: Ma grande sœur Emmanuelle, in Tout feu, tout femme!, ‘My great sister Emmanuelle, in All fire, all woman!’, Rouge Orange 2013 (Sacem RO201311/1/1)
- "Yalla", crée et chantée en 2004 par Calogero, en son honneur et par reconnaissance de son action auprès des enfants d'Égypte (‘Created and sung in 2004 by Calogero, in her honor and recognition of her work with the children of Egypt’)
