= Chapel of Our Lady of Sion =

Coordinates: 31°46′5.1″N 35°9′34.0″E

- French: Notre Dame de Sion Chapel; Hebrew: קפלת גבירתנו של שיאון
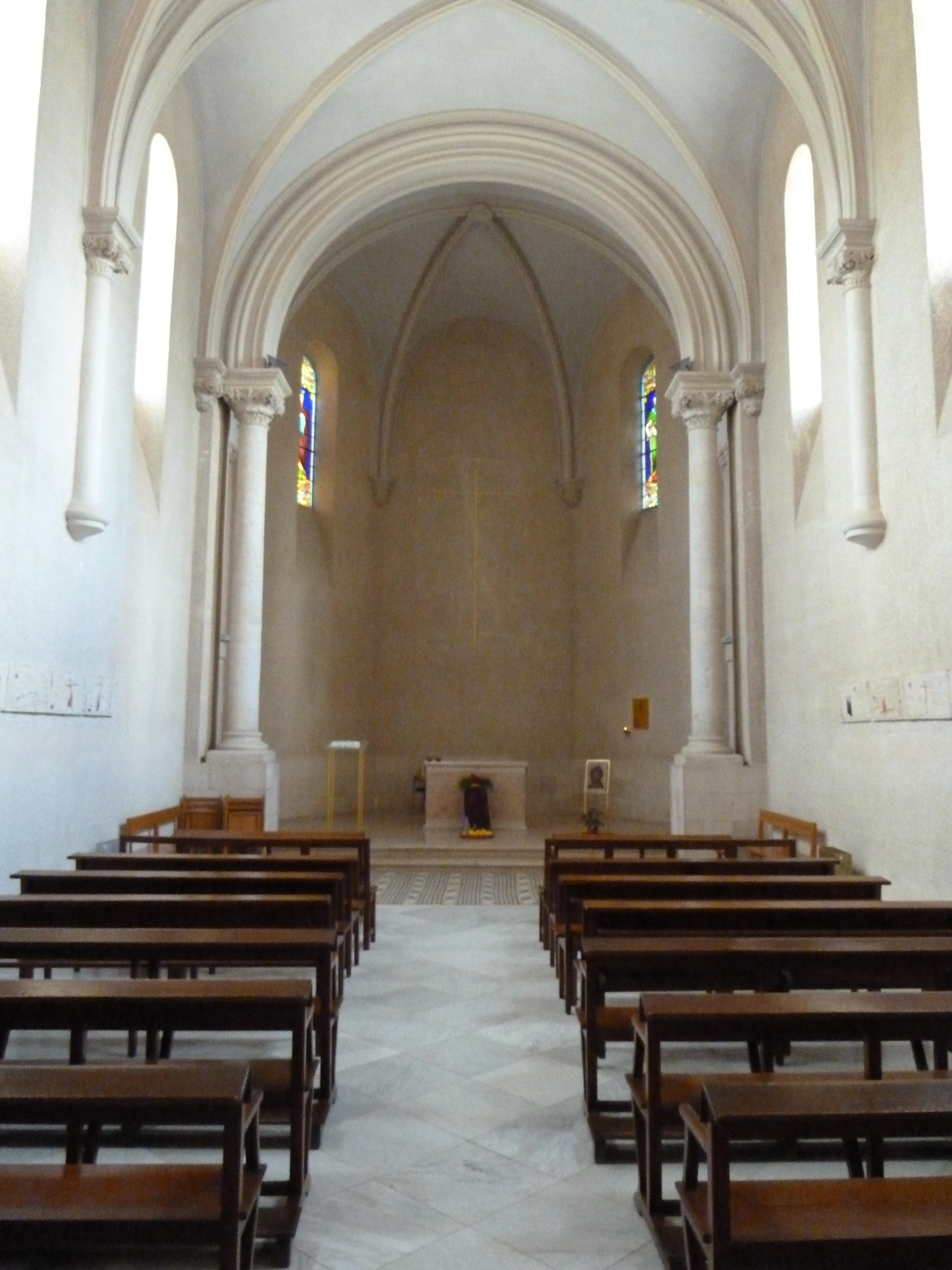
- Chapel of Our Lady of Sion
- Location: Ein Karem, Jerusalem
- Country: Israel
- Denomination: Roman Catholic Church

The Chapel of Our Lady of Sion (French: Notre Dame de Sion Chapel, Hebrew: קפלת גבירתנו של שיאון) is a Catholic chapel located in an old building of the sisters of the Congregation of Our Lady of Sion in the western hill of Ein Karem, a neighborhood in the District of Jerusalem, Israel.

The convent complex was inaugurated in 1860 and is managed by Catholic nuns since 1861. The temple is under the jurisdiction of the Latin Patriarchate of Jerusalem, which was established in its modern form in 1847 by Pope Pius IX.

== Gallery ==
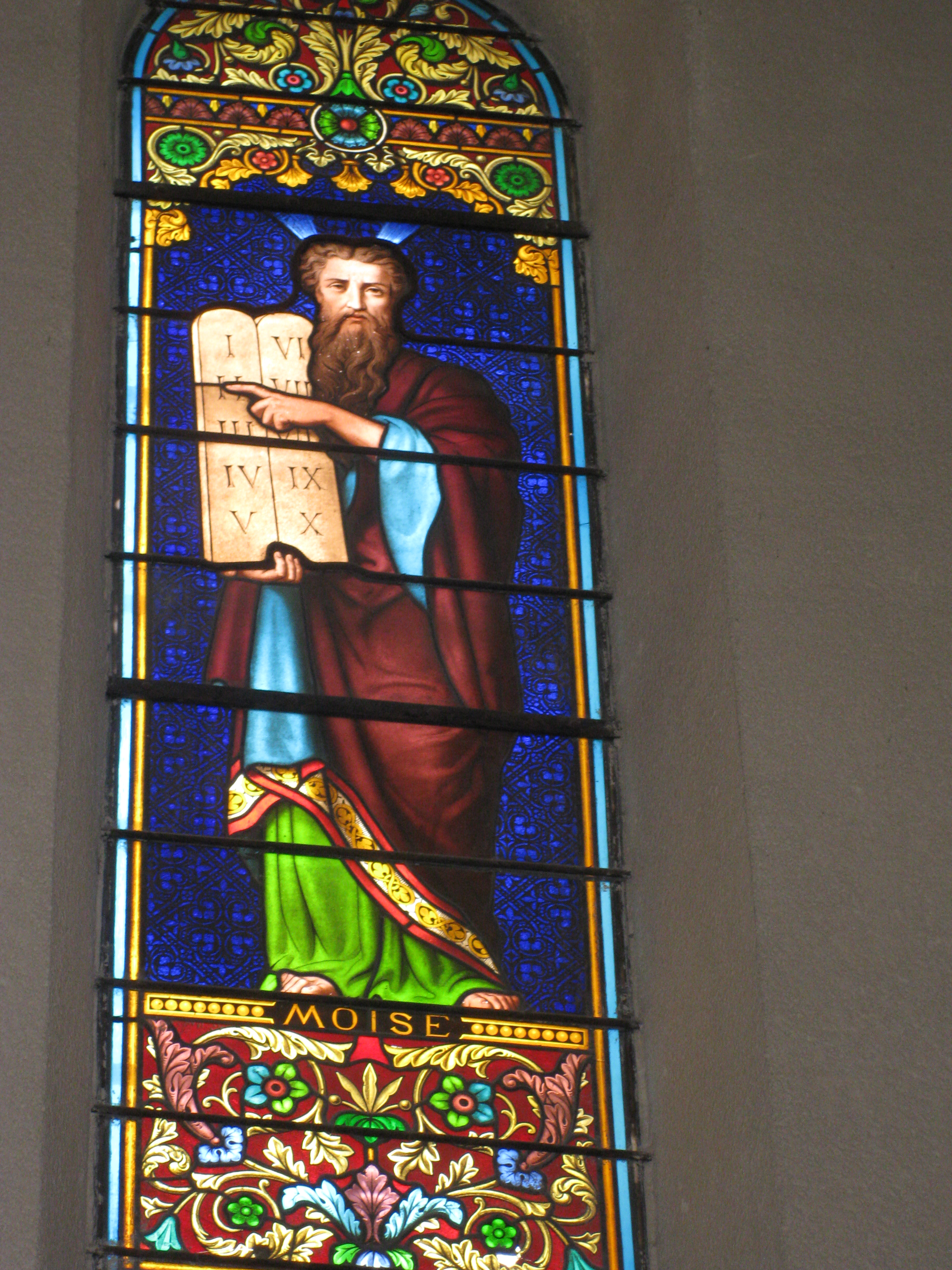
One of the stained glass dedicated to Moses

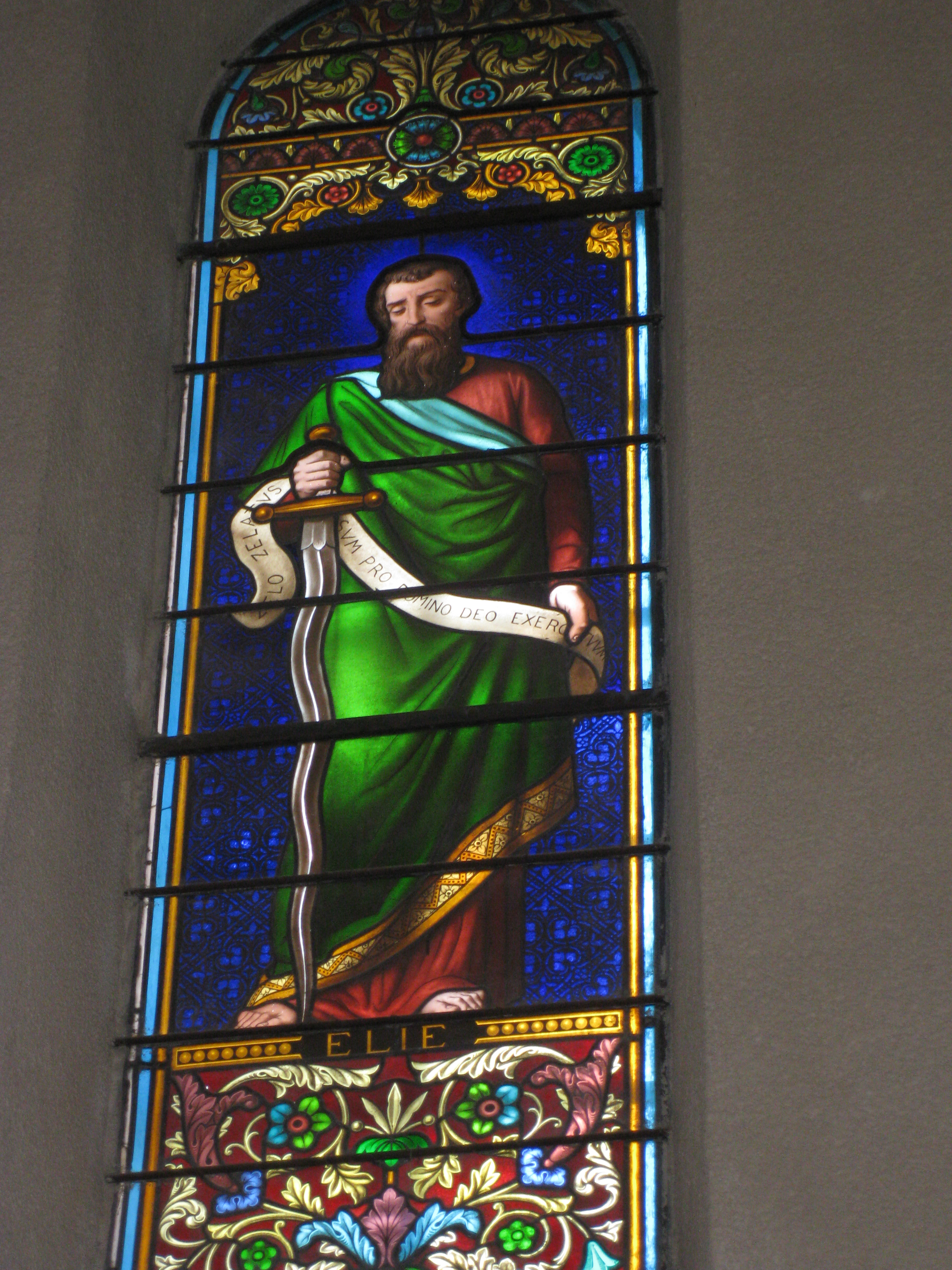
Another stained glass

== See also ==
- Roman Catholicism in Israel
- Latin Patriarchate of Jerusalem
