= Congregation of Our Lady of Sion =

Catholic order of religious sisters

The Congregation of Our Lady of Sion (French: Congrégation de Notre-Dame de Sion, abbreviated NDS) is composed of two religious congregations in the Roman Catholic Church founded in Paris, France. One is composed of priests and religious brothers, founded in 1852, and the other is composed of religious sisters, founded in 1843, both by Marie-Théodore Ratisbonne, along with his brother Marie-Alphonse Ratisbonne, "to witness in the Church and in the world that God continues to be faithful in his love for the Jewish people and to hasten the fulfillment of the promises concerning the Jews and the Gentiles". (Constitution, article 2).

== Foundation ==
=== Religious brothers ===
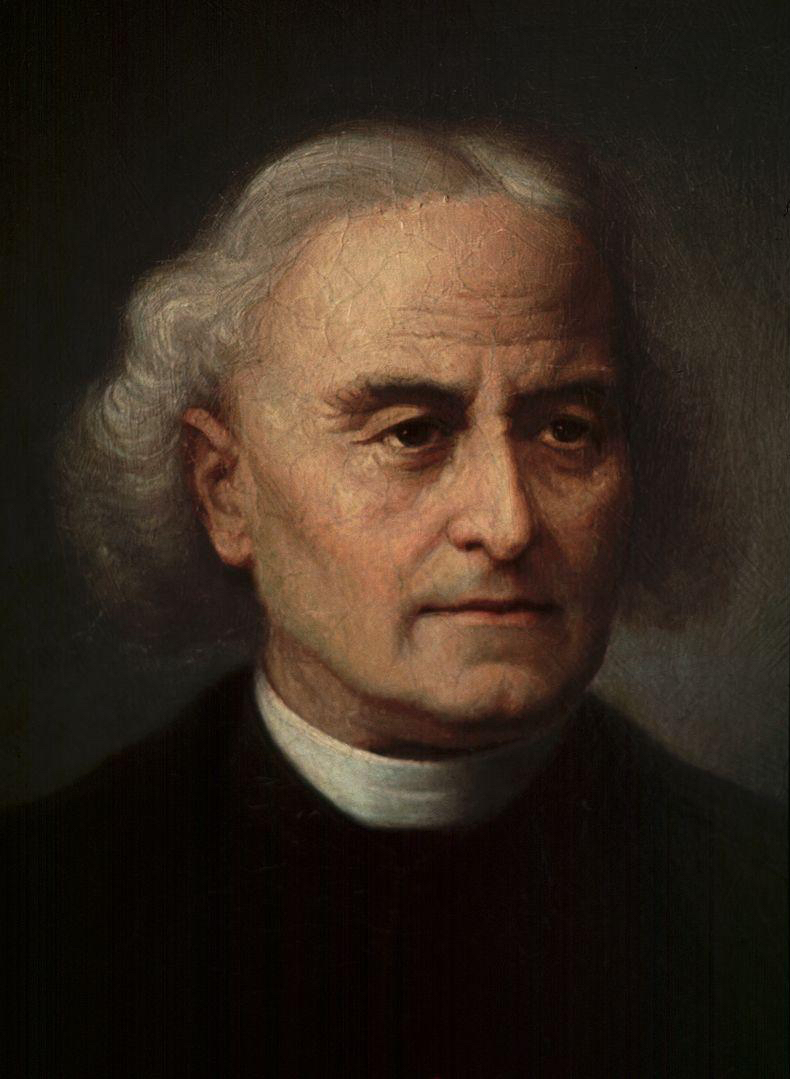
Portrait of Marie-Théodore Ratisbonne, NDS [December 28, 1802 – January 10, 1884]

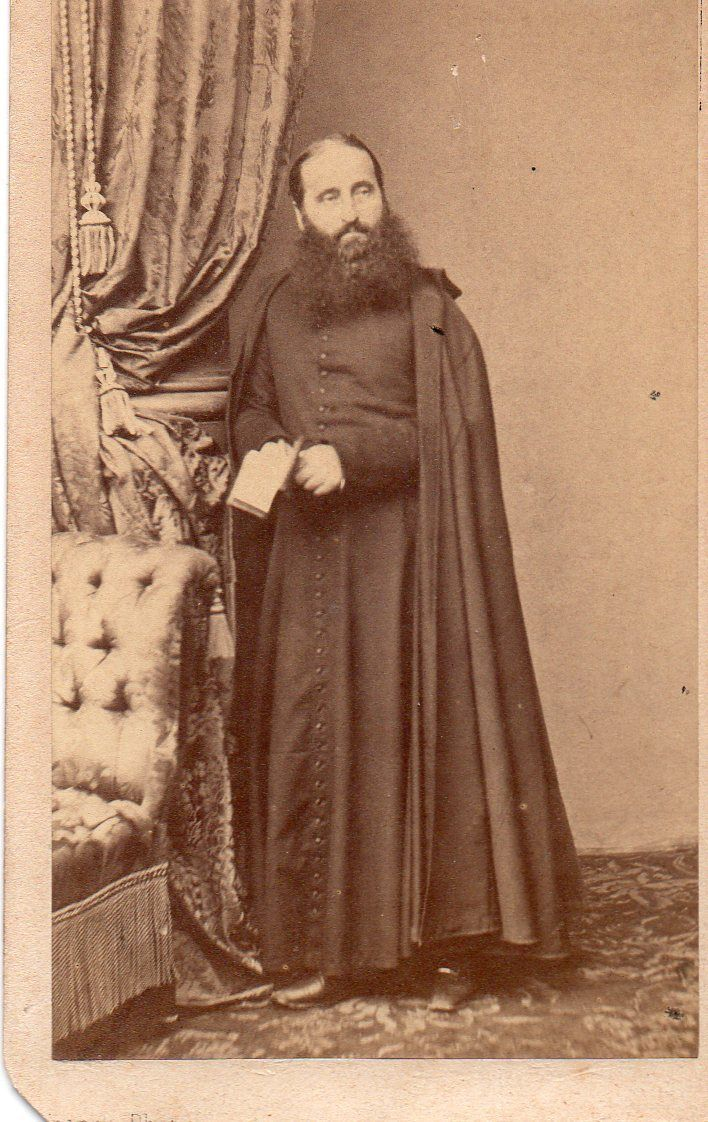
Marie-Alphonse Ratisbonne NDS in 1865 [May 1, 1814 – May 6, 1884]

The Ratisbonne brothers, who were Jews, were drawn to accept Christianity. For Théodore, this came about through the conversion of several close friends and the slow results of study and reading. He was baptized in 1826 and ordained in 1830.

Alphonse, however, was more reluctant to believe in Christ. This changed dramatically on 20 January 1842 in the course of a trip to Rome, made just prior to his planned wedding. While on a visit to the Church of Sant'Andrea delle Fratte, the Blessed Virgin Mary appeared to him. Both brothers believed that this was a sign from God, not only for Alphonse's personal conversion, but of their common call to bring their fellow Jews to accept the Christian faith.

To this end, Alphonse was baptized and soon entered the Society of Jesus, where he spent several years. In 1843, Théodore founded a small community of women who wished to collaborate with him in the education of Jewish children, starting with two Jewish sisters who had come to him for guidance and later converted to Christianity. In 1850, with the permission of Pope Pius IX and of the Jesuit Superior General Jan Roothaan, Alphonse left the Society to join his brother and his work. Together the Ratisbonne brothers established the Congregation of the Fathers of Our Lady of Sion in 1852.

In 1855 Alphonse moved to the Holy Land, where, in 1858, he established the Convent of the Ecce homo on the site of a ruined church by that name on the famed Via Dolorosa for the Sisters of the congregation. On the convent grounds, Ratisbonne built an orphanage and vocational school which the Sisters ran and were open to all children of the city, regardless of creed. A motherhouse was established in Paris for the Fathers. In 1874, Alphonse began the construction of Ratisbonne Monastery, on a site then on the outskirts of Jerusalem, which was a school for boys. It now houses a branch of the Salesian Pontifical University.

After revisions to official teachings regarding Judaism, the Fathers changed from an emphasis on the conversion of Jews to working towards understanding and the development of deeper ties between Christians and Jews. Today they have communities in France, Israel and Brazil.

=== Religious sisters ===
For many years most of the sisters were teachers in Sion schools in France and the Holy Land. They later expanded overseas to the British Isles and Australia. The Sisters of Sion define themselves as "woman who help to heal a fractured world". The sisters were invited to England by Cardinal Manning to help with the expansion of Catholic education in the country. They arrived in 1860 and have had a presence in England ever since. They then established a presence in Australia with the first Sisters arriving in 1890.

Since the Second Vatican Council the work of the sisters has expanded and developed. Now there is a wide variety of ministries. The congregation now has sisters in 22 countries worldwide, with their motherhouse located in Rome. Like the Fathers, the sisters no longer emphasise conversion, but instead describe themselves as working to improve Catholic-Jewish relations and to witness to God's faithful love for the Jewish people.

One of its best-known members of the Congregation was Emmanuelle Cinquin (1908–2008) who worked in Istanbul and Cairo.

== Schools ==
- Our Lady of Sion College, Melbourne, Australia
- Catholic College, Sale, Victoria, Australia
- Ecole bilingue Notre-Dame de Sion, Montreal, Canada
- St. Maurice School, Winnipeg, Canada
- Notre Dame de Sion School, Kansas City, Missouri, USA
- Colegio Nuestra Señora de Sion, Moravia, Costa Rica
- Colegio Notre Dame de Sion, Rio de Janeiro, Brasil
- Colégio Nossa Senhora de Sion, Curitiba, Brasil
- Colégio Nossa Senhora de Sion, Petropolis, Brasil
- Our Lady of Sion School, Worthing, England
- Lycée Notre Dame de Sion Istanbul, Istanbul, Turkey
- Notre Dame de Sion School, Alexandria, Egypt

== See also ==
- Geza Vermes, a member of the brothers from the late 1940s until about 1957.
- Notre Dame de Sion School, Kansas City
- Lycée Notre Dame de Sion Istanbul

Jerusalem

- Convent of the Sisters of Zion
- Chapel of Our Lady of Sion
- Ratisbonne Monastery, Jerusalem

Europe

- Basilica of Notre-Dame de Sion, Saxon-Sion, Meurthe-et-Moselle
- St Augustine's Priory, Ealing
- Our Lady of Sion School, Worthing, West Sussex, England
- Sion Cathedral, Roman Catholic Diocese of Sion
