= Gabbatha =

Place in Jerusalem

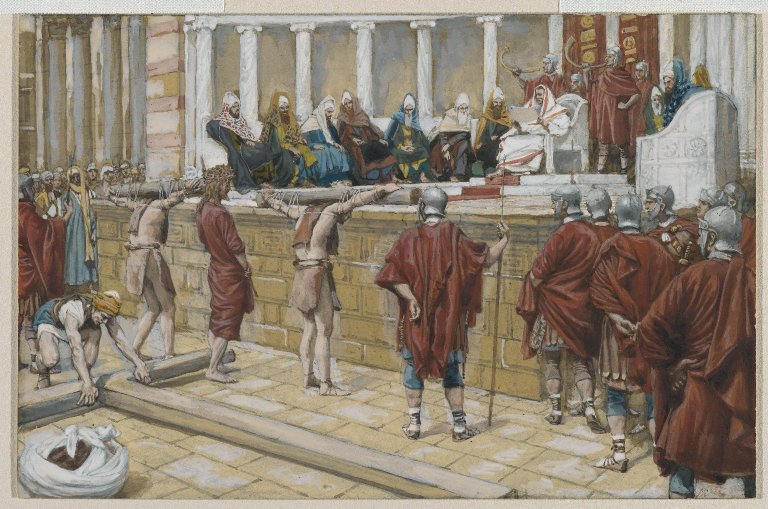
The Judgment on the Gabbatha by James Tissot, c. 1890

Gabbatha (Jewish Palestinian Aramaic: גבתא) is the name of a place in Jerusalem that is also referred to by the Greek name of Lithostrōtos (Ancient Greek: λιθόστρωτος). It is recorded in the gospels to be the place of the trial of Jesus before his crucifixion c. 30/33 AD. The site of the Church of Ecce Homo is traditionally thought to be its location, but archaeological investigation has proven this unlikely. Herod's Palace is a more likely location.

== Etymology ==
Lithostrōtos (lit. 'stone pavement', from lithos 'stone' and strōtos στρωτός 'covered') occurs in the Bible only once, in John 19:13. It states that Pontius Pilate "brought Jesus forth, and sat down in the judgment seat, in the place that is called Lithostrotos, and in Hebrew Gabbatha."

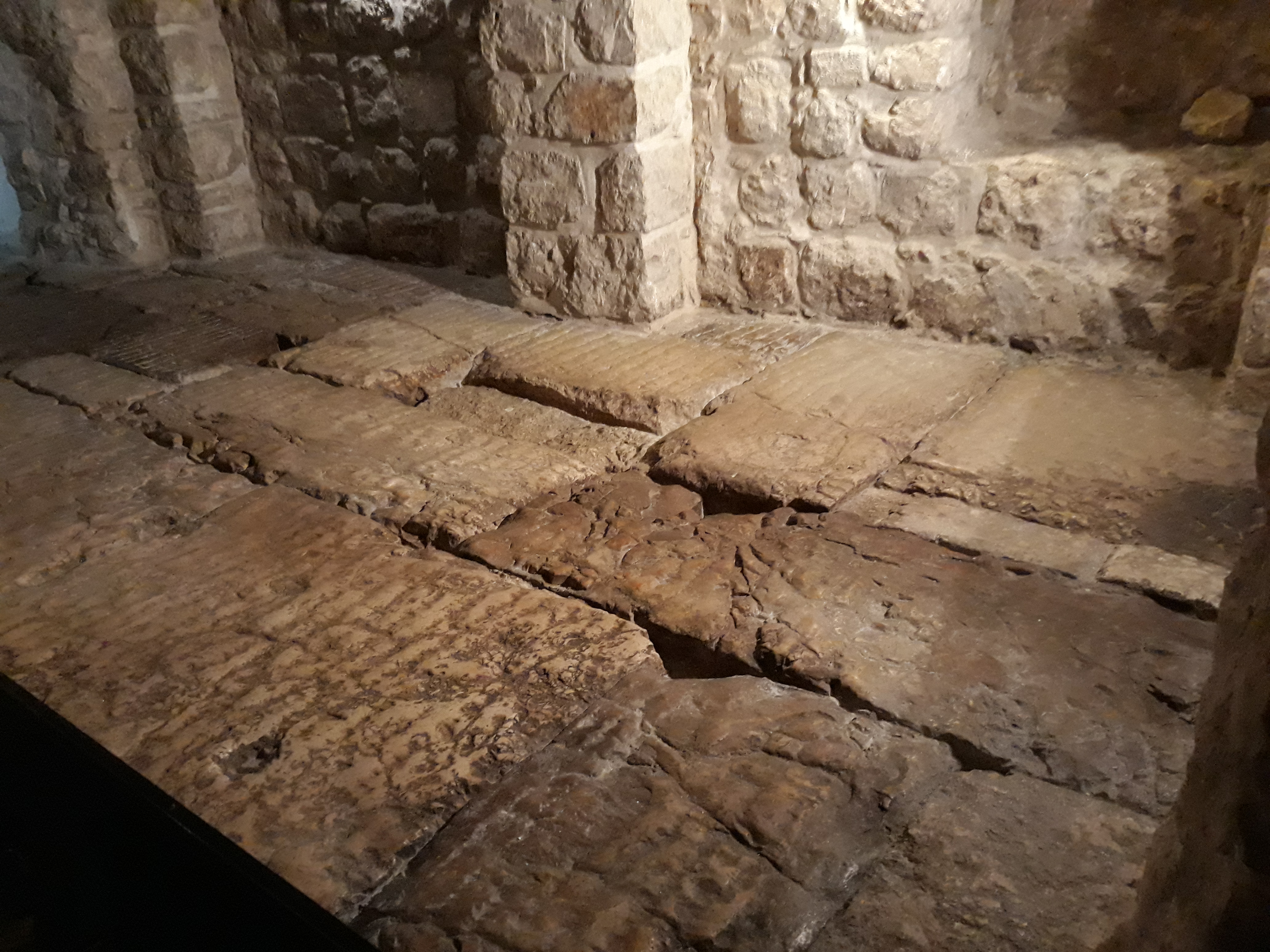
Roman pavement thought by some to be the site of Jesus' trial with Pontius Pilate. Convent of the Sisters of Zion.

The name Gabbatha is an Aramaic word (not Hebrew, despite some translations of John, though the Greek could also indicate Aramaic), Aramaic being the language commonly spoken at the time in Judea. It is not a mere translation of Lithostrotos, which properly means the tessellated or mosaic pavement where the judgment seat stood, but which was extended to the place itself in front of Pilate's praetorium, where that pavement was laid. This was proved by the practice of St. John, who elsewhere gives Aramaic names as distinctly belonging to places, not as mere translations of the Greek. This is proved also because Gabbatha is derived from a root meaning "back" or "elevation"—which refers not to the kind of pavement but to the elevation of the place in question. It thus appears that the two names Lithostrotos and Gabbatha were due to different characteristics of the spot where Pilate condemned Jesus to death. The Aramaic name was derived from the configuration of that spot, with the Greek name derived from the nature of its pavement.

== Identification ==
=== Temple (outer court or nearby) ===
Commentators have made efforts to identify Gabbatha either with the outer court of the Temple, which is known to have been paved, or with the meeting-place of the Great Sanhedrin, which was half within, half without that temple's outer court, or again with the ridge at the back of the House of the Lord; but these efforts cannot be considered as successful.

=== Antonia ===
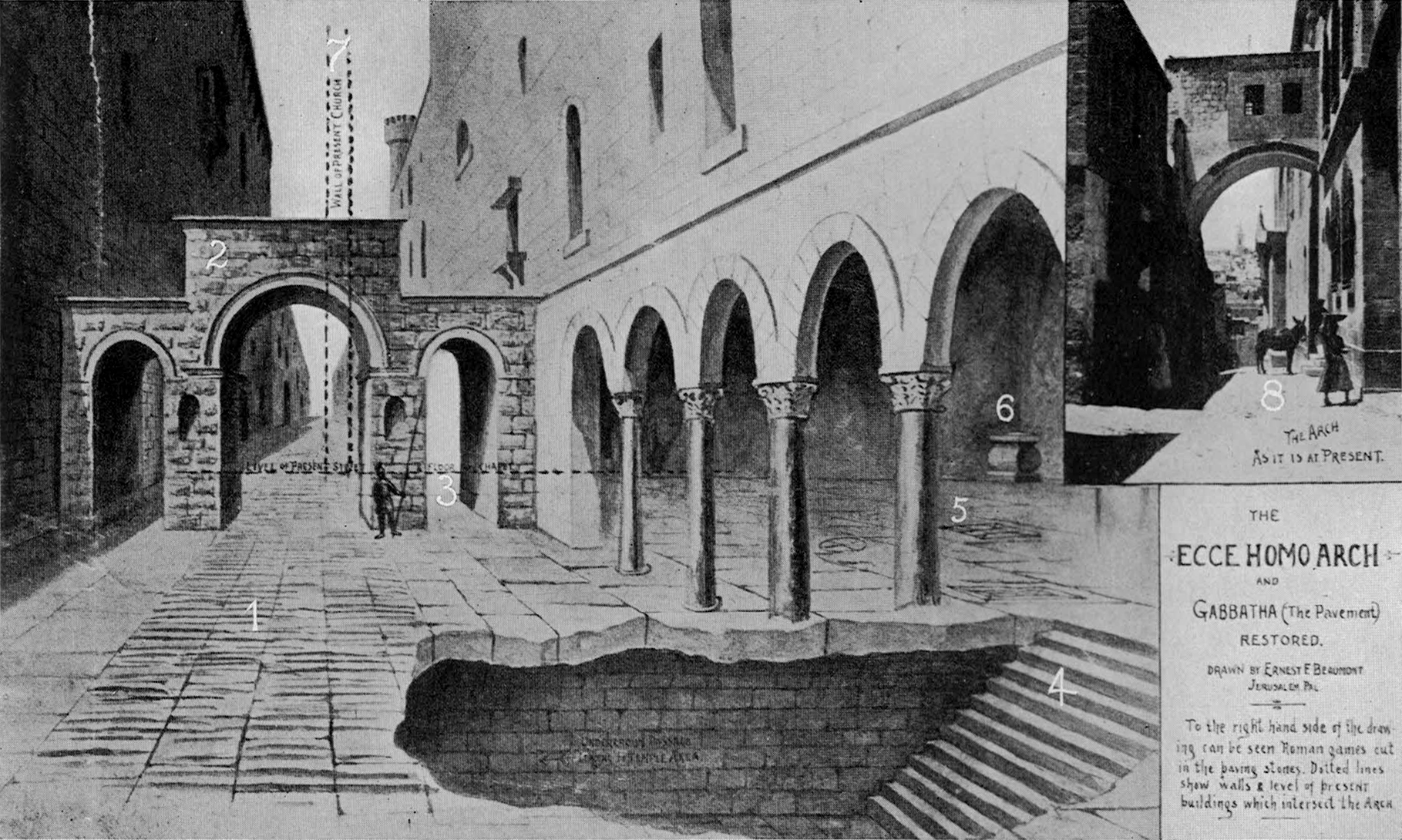
Depiction of the gateway of the eastern forum of Aelia Capitolina and original Roman pavement. The vertical lines show where the wall of the Convent of the Sisters of Zion currently extends. The horizontal line shows the modern street level. The stairs led to the Antonia Fortress.

Archaeological studies have confirmed that the Roman pavement at these two traditional stations was built by Hadrian in the 2nd century AD as the flooring of the eastern forum of Aelia Capitolina. Before Hadrian's changes, the area had been a large open-air pool of water, the Struthion Pool mentioned by Josephus. The pool still survives under vaulting added by Hadrian so that the forum could be built over it, and can be accessed from the portion of Roman paving under the Convent of the Sisters of Zion, and from the Western Wall Tunnel.

A triple-arched gate built by Hadrian as an entrance to the eastern forum of Aelia Capitolina was traditionally, but as archaeological investigation shows, mistakenly, said to have been part of the gate of Herod's Antonia Fortress. This was alleged to be the location of Jesus' trial and Pilate's ecce homo speech.

=== Herod's royal palace ===
According to Pierre Benoit, Pilate carried out his judgements at Herod's Palace at the west side of the city, rather than at Antonia in the city's eastern area and the Temple's northwest corner. Shimon Gibson supports this view.
