= Monica C. Jackson =

American statistician and academic administrator

- Occupations: Deputy Provost & Dean of Faculty at American University

Academic background
- Education: University of Maryland, College Park
- Doctoral advisor: Estelle Russek-Cohen

Academic work
- Discipline: Statistician
- Sub-discipline: Spatial statistics and disease monitoring
- Institutions: American University

Monica Christine Jackson is an American statistician and academic administrator, the Deputy Provost and Dean of Faculty at American University. Her research focuses on spatial statistics and disease monitoring, pertaining to the analysis of identifying cancer clusters and assessing global clustering trends.

== Education and career ==
Jackson is African American, originally from Kansas City, Missouri, and has two brothers, one her twin. She loved mathematics from a very young age, and after growing bored with the public school mathematics curriculum available to her, transferred in middle school to a more demanding program at a Catholic girls' school, Notre Dame de Sion. She majored in mathematics at Clark Atlanta University, graduating in 1992, and continued there for a master's degree in 1994. She completed her Ph.D. in statistics in 2003 at the University of Maryland, College Park, with the dissertation Spatial Data Analysis for Discrete Data on a Lattice supervised by Estelle Russek-Cohen.

Postdoctoral research at Emory University led her to focus on the spatial statistics of disease monitoring. She joined American University as an assistant professor of statistics in 2005. She earned tenure there as an associate professor in 2011. After becoming a full professor, and Associate Dean of undergraduate studies, she was appointed as Deputy Provost and Dean of Faculty in 2021.

== Selected publications ==
Jackson is a coauthor of the book Elementary Statistics: A Guide to Data Analysis Using R (Cognella, 2022, with Nancy Glenn-Griesinger and Daniel Vrinceanu).

Her research articles include:

- Jackson, Monica C; Huang, Lan; Luo, Jun; Hachey, Mark; Feuer, Eric (2009), "Comparison of tests for spatial heterogeneity on data with global clustering patterns and outliers", International Journal of Health Geographics, 8 (1) 55, Springer Science and Business Media LLC, doi:10.1186/1476-072x-8-55, PMC 2770045, PMID 19822013
- Jackson, Monica C.; Huang, Lan; Xie, Qian; Tiwari, Ram C. (2010), "A modified version of Moran's I", International Journal of Health Geographics, 9 (1) 33, Bibcode:2010IJHGg...9...33J, doi:10.1186/1476-072x-9-33, PMC 2903534, PMID 20587045
- Jackson, Monica C.; Trotman, Adria; Stephens, Melissa; Sellers, Kimberly F. (2013), “The Effect of Latency Variables on Repeated Measures Inference Applied to the Measurement of Risk-Taking as a Function of Psychopathy.” Quality & Quantity 47 (1): 15–26. https://doi.org/10.1007/s11135-011-9475-4.
- Arab, Ali; Jackson, Monica C.; Kongoli, Cezar (March 2014), "Modelling the effects of weather and climate on malaria distributions in West Africa", Malaria Journal, 13 (1) 126, doi:10.1186/1475-2875-13-126, PMC 3976358, PMID 24678602
