= St. Maurice School =

Location
- 1639 Pembina Highway; Winnipeg, Manitoba, R3T 2G6; Canada; 49.8298°N 97.1526°W

Information
- School type: Parochial school
- Motto: Integritas Libertas Modestia (Integrity Liberty Modesty)
- Religious affiliation: Catholic
- Founded: 1958
- Director: Father Wayne Morrissey
- Principal: Mr. Bryan Doiron
- Grades: Kindergarten to Grade 12
- Enrolment: 715
- Language: English
- Area: Fort Garry
- Colours: Blue, White and Yellow
- Team name: Patriots
- Website: www.stmaurice.mb.ca

St. Maurice School is a Parochial school in Winnipeg, Manitoba, Canada. It is the largest Co-educational Catholic school in the province.

St. Maurice was founded in 1958 by Maurice Cournoyer and the Sisters of Sion, and was officially opened on September 28, 1958. However, due to declining student population, the school was closed in June 1970.

St. Maurice School was reopened and incorporated on September 4, 1979, with the support of St. Vital Roman Catholic Church.

== History ==
In September 1958, under the direction of Monsignor Maurice Alonzo Cournoyer, St. Vital Church, opened a four-room school on Winnipeg Route 42, just south of Manahan Avenue. This was with assistance from Sisters of Sion.

On September 22, the school was dedicated to St. Maurice, in honour of Mons. Cournoyer. The official opening was conducted on September 28 by Philip Pocock.

In the summer of 1960 four more rooms were added to the school building.

In 1967, Fr. John Currie succeeded Mons. Cournoyer as Pastor and Director of St. Maurice School.

Due to a declining enrolment over several years, the decision to close the school was made in June 1970.

After eight years of service, Fr. Currie was moved from the parish and Fr. Edward Morand was approached by George Flahiff to be the new Pastor of St. Vital Church.

On January 11, 1978, brother of Fr. Edward, Fr. Patrick Morand arrived to share the pastoral duties until July 1978.

Through the relentless efforts of Fr. Patrick Morand, St. Maurice School was reopened in September 1979, with the school becoming incorporated under the Canadian corporate law on September 4, 1979.

The first St. Maurice School Board meeting took place on December 19, 1979.

In September 1980, two additional classrooms were added and in the spring of that year a gymnasium and a parish hall were completed.

Grades seven and eight were added in September 1983 and two additional rooms were needed.

Adam Exner blessed the two new classrooms on December 11, 1983.

On June 24, 1984, St. Maurice School paid tribute to its first Grade 8 graduating class.

The High School wing was added on in 1987 and St. Maurice School opened its doors as the only Kindergarten to Grade 12 Catholic School in the Province of Manitoba.

A new Parish Administration Centre and Rectory was built in 1990. This facility physically and philosophically provided a connection between St. Maurice School and St. Vital Parish Church, which now existed physically “under one roof”.

Due to an ever-increasing enrolment at the school, a new wing of six classrooms was built in 1999 and now houses the Grade 4 to 6 classes.

The St. Maurice Daycare and the Before and After School Program opened in May 2002. Many new facilities were constructed during 2004-2005 school year.

The three kindergarten classrooms were relocated across the street from the main school and parish building.

The library was moved to a central location in the elementary area of the school. The lower level below the gym was re-developed into a full service cafeteria and music room.

The official opening and blessing by Fr. Morand took place on April 28, 2005. After 30 years of service as the Director of St. Maurice School, Mons. Morand retired in 2009.

Fr. Barry Schoonbaert became Pastor of St. Vital Parish and Director of St. Maurice School on July 1, 2009, and continued in those roles until June 30, 2017. During his tenure as Director of St. Maurice School, Father Barry oversaw the modernization of the school’s finances and the continued growth of the student population to just under 700.

Fr. Mark Tarrant was appointed Pastor of St. Vital Parish and Director of St. Maurice School effective July 1, 2017.
