= Saxon-Sion =

- Commune
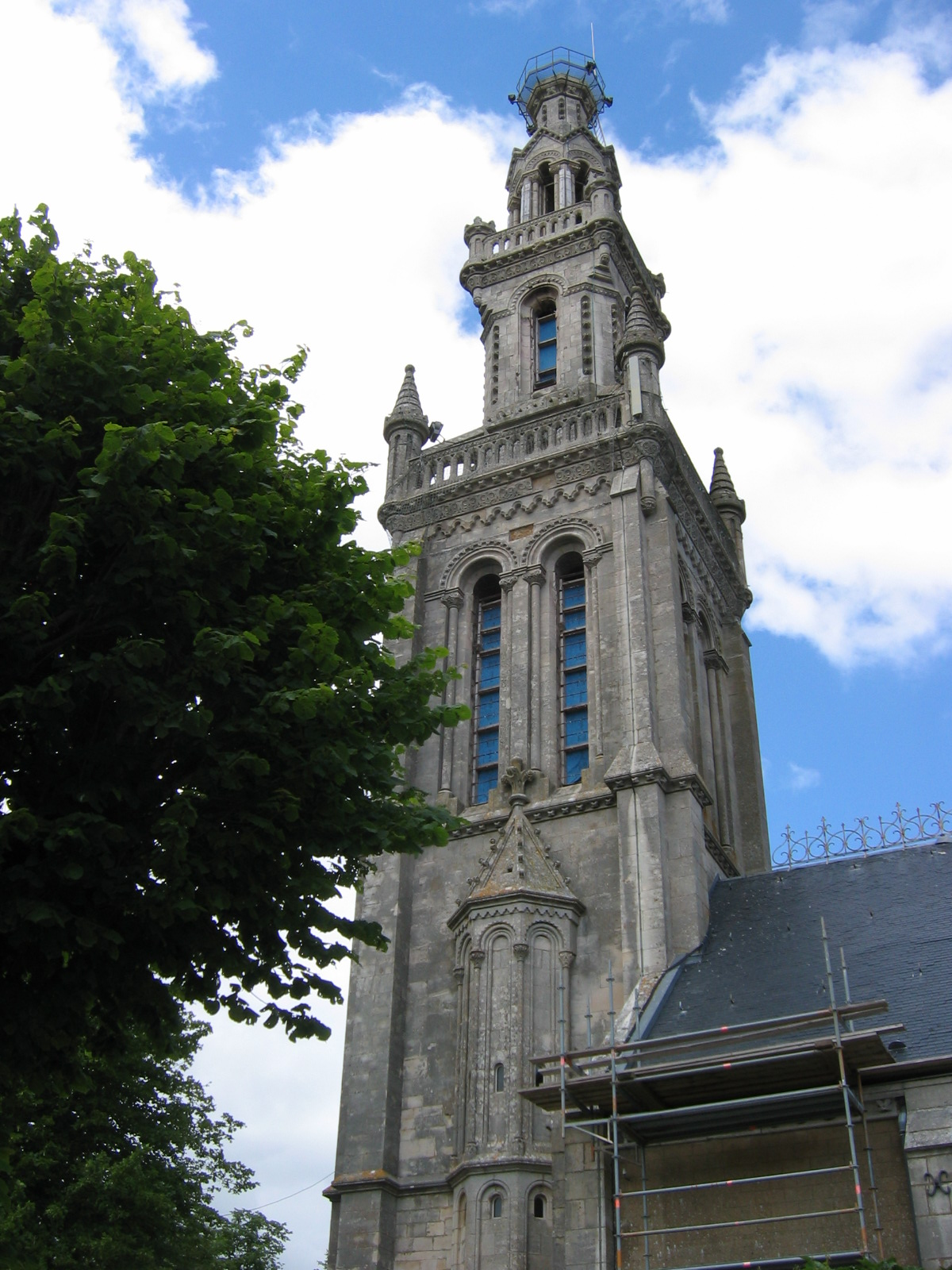
- The church in Sion

- Coat of arms
- Location of Saxon-Sion
- Location within France Location within Grand Est
- Coordinates: 48°25′36″N 6°04′47″E
- Country: France
- Region: Grand Est
- Department: Meurthe-et-Moselle
- Arrondissement: Nancy
- Canton: Meine au Saintois
- Intercommunality: CC Pays du Saintois

Government
  - Mayor (2020–2026): Francine Parisot
- Area^{1}: 6.25 km^{2} (2.41 sq mi)
- Elevation: 480 m (1,570 ft)
- Highest elevation: 528 m (1,732 ft)
- Lowest elevation: 302 m (991 ft)
- Population (2023): 46
  - Density: 7.4/km^{2} (19/sq mi)
- Time zone: UTC+01:00 (CET)
  - Summer (DST): UTC+02:00 (CEST)
- INSEE/Postal code: 54497 /54330
- ^{1} French Land Register data, which excludes lakes, ponds, glaciers > 1 km^{2} (0.386 sq mi or 247 acres) and river estuaries.

Saxon-Sion is a commune in the Meurthe-et-Moselle department in north-eastern France. In it are located the villages of Saxon and Sion.

== Population ==
Historical population
Year	Pop.	±% p.a.
1968	88	—
1975	96	+1.25%
1982	84	−1.89%
1990	80	−0.61%
1999	80	+0.00%
2007	70	−1.66%
2012	75	+1.39%
2017	102	+6.34%
2023	46	−12.43%
Source: INSEE

== See also ==
- Communes of the Meurthe-et-Moselle department
