= Notre Dame de Sion School, Kansas City =

Private high school in Kansas City, Missouri, US

Notre Dame de Sion School

Location
- 10631 Wornall Road; Kansas City, (Jackson County), Missouri 64114; United States; 38°56′6″N 94°35′44″W

Information
- Type: Private college-preparatory school
- Motto: Educating Minds, Expanding Hearts, Empowering Lives
- Religious affiliation: Roman Catholic
- Established: 1912; 114 years ago
- Head of school: Alicia Herald
- Grades: Preschool–12
- Gender: Girls (high school); Coed (grade school)
- Colors: Purple and white
- Slogan: Put Faith in their Future
- Song: Chanson d'école
- Team name: Sion Storm
- Rival: St. Teresa's Academy
- Accreditation: ISACS
- Publication: The Siren (literary magazine)
- Newspaper: Le Journal
- Yearbook: Le Flambeau
- Website: ndsion.edu

Notre Dame de Sion School ( /ˈnoʊtər ˈdeɪm də ˈsaɪ.ɒn/) is a preschool through grade 12 certified college preparatory school located in Kansas City, Missouri. This Roman Catholic school was founded by the Sisters of Notre Dame de Sion in 1912. The all-girls, high school campus is located in south Kansas City, and the co-educational grade school campus is located in the Hyde Park neighborhood. The two campuses are about 10 miles apart.

Notre Dame de Sion in Kansas City is one of seventeen Sion schools worldwide. Notre Dame de Sion in Kansas City is affiliated with the Diocese of Kansas City–St. Joseph as well as the Congregation of the Sisters of Notre Dame de Sion. The school is owned by a lay corporation and governed by a board of trustees.

== History ==
=== Hyde Park ===
In 1892, the Congregation arrived in the United States when four Sisters of Sion began educating young children in Auburn and Lewiston, Maine. By 1904, the number of Sisters had grown to sixty. In 1907, the Sisters transferred to Marshall, Missouri, where they taught at Sion Academy until 1925. In 1912, Bishop Thomas Francis Lillis invited seven Sisters to Kansas City. Two taught in the Annunciation School. The others began a French kindergarten and gave private sewing, music, and French lessons, which grew into the Notre Dame de Sion School. For decades to follow, the Sisters continued managing and growing the institution, building their first campus in Kansas City's historic Hyde Park.

In 1953, Bobby Greenlease was kidnapped from the Hyde Park school by a woman claiming to be his aunt. The $600,000 ransom paid by his family was the largest paid to that point, although Greenlease had been killed before the ransom was paid.

The original campus is now Notre Dame de Sion Grade School for Girls and Boys and located at 3823 Locust and the structure was finished in 1927. The college preparatory institution is co-ed and includes four divisions: Early Childhood (PreK Montessori that teaches children from ages two through four or five), Primary (kindergarten through third grade), Intermediate (fourth and fifth grades), and Middle (sixth, seventh, and eighth grades). The campus features many prayer paths and student working in Maisons and Faith Families complete various service projects aligned with the Corporal Works of Mercy.

=== South Kansas City ===
In 1962, the high school moved to South Kansas City at 10631 Wornall Rd. Six years later the Sisters invited lay members to serve on the school's board of trustees, and in 1990 the ownership of the school was transferred to the Board.

== Extracurriculars ==
Sion has a musical and performs plays. It also has a drum line and choir.

Sion's dance team won 10th overall in the nation in 2019 and has won 1st place in the state of Missouri for ten consecutive years. During the 2021–2022 year, the volleyball team took 4th place, its first appearance at a national level in over 15 years. Other sports include basketball, softball, cheerleading, swimming, diving, soccer, volleyball, field hockey, lacrosse, cross-country, and track.

Notre Dame de Sion High School received the Community Service Award in 2022–2023.

== Notable alumnae ==
- Megan Barry – former Mayor of Nashville
- Heidi Gardner – actress on Saturday Night Live
- Monica C. Jackson – statistician and academic administrator
- Felicia Knox – soccer player
- Devyn Simone – American television host, matchmaker, and media personality
- Maggie Williams – Former Chief of Staff for Hillary Clinton, one of the early African-American graduates in the 1970s
