= Marie-Théodore Ratisbonne =

Jewish convert and Catholic priest and founder (1802–1884)

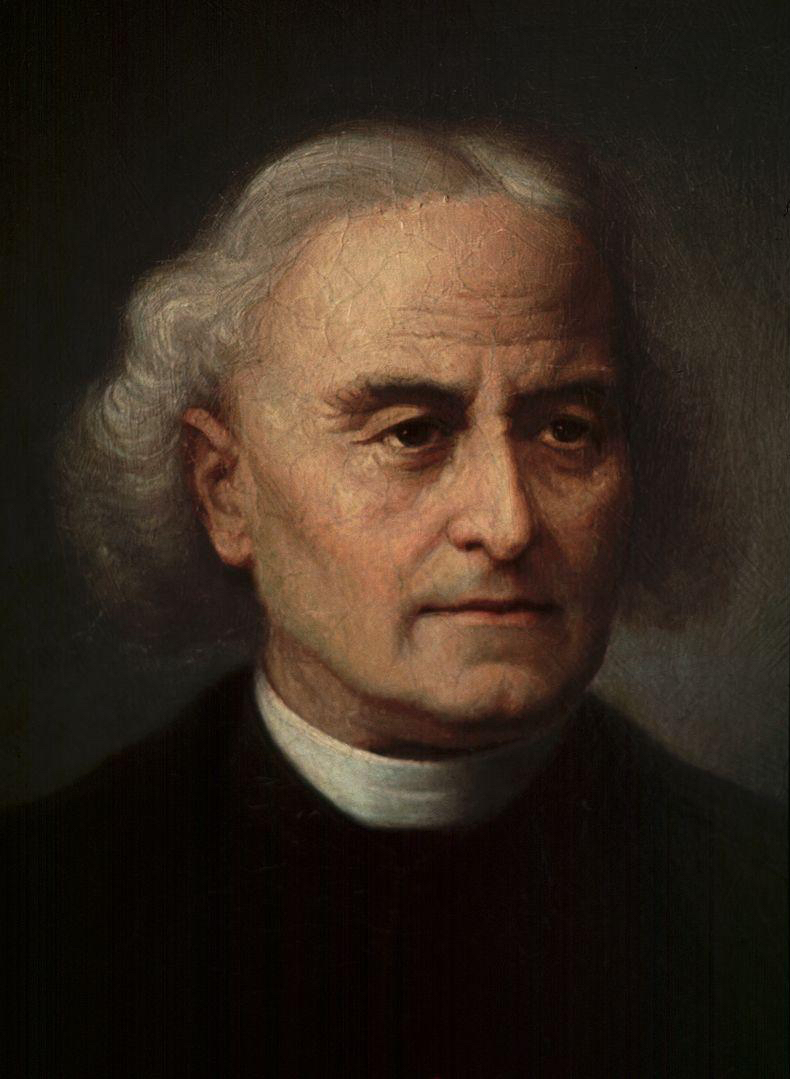
Portrait of Marie-Théodore Ratisbonne, N.D.S.

Marie-Théodore Ratisbonne, N.D.S., (28 December 1802 – 10 January 1884) was a French Jewish convert to the Catholic Church, who became a priest and missionary and who later founded the Congregation of Our Lady of Sion. He was the brother of Marie-Alphonse Ratisbonne, who joined him in this effort.

== Life ==
=== Early life ===
Théodore Ratisbonne was one of the 13 children born in Strasbourg, Alsace, France, to Auguste Ratisbonne and his wife, Adélaïde Cerfbeer, who were members of a noted Jewish banking family. His father additionally served as president of the Provincial Council of Alsace.

=== Conversion ===
At the age of 22, Ratisbonne gained the acquaintance of a local Catholic, Louise Humann, who was a catechist and active in works of charity. After the conversion of his friends, Emile Dreyfus, Alfred Mayer and Samson Liebermann to Christianity, Théodore spent two years under her guidance studying the Scriptures, both the Hebrew Scriptures and the New Testament, which eventually led him to embrace Christianity. He was baptized in 1826, at which time he added the name Marie (Mary) to his given name, and was ordained as a priest in 1830.

This step by Théodore caused his family to reject him.

Through his embrace of Christianity, Théodore Ratisbonne joined a wave of conversions then taking place in the French Jewish community, triggered by a sense that the Jews could not achieve full integration in French society as long as they remained Jews. He had reached the conclusion that there was a fundamental incompatibility between Judaism and French citizenship. Until his conversion, he was active in the Societe d'Encouragement au Travail en Faveur des Israelites du Bas-Rhin (Society for the Advancement of the Israelites of the Lower Rhine). He later felt that this involvement in Jewish communal affairs was a preparatory step to his baptism.

=== Ministry ===
Théodore Ratisbonne published a biography of St. Bernard of Clairvaux, A Life of St. Bernard, in 1841. During a visit to Rome the following year, this work drew the admiration of Pope Gregory XVI, for which the Pope made him a Knight of the Order of St. Sylvester in recognition of his contribution to the Catholic faith. Ratisbonne was still very conscious of his Jewish roots and how his heritage was the basis for his faith as a Catholic. He wanted to work to help other Jews who would embrace Christianity. After his own sudden conversion, Alphonse had proposed to his brother the founding of schools for providing a Christian education to Jewish children. The Pope gave his blessing and authorization for this mission.

The first concrete step was accomplished with his founding of the Sisters of Our Lady of Sion in 1847, the first members being two Jewish sisters who converted to Catholicism and committed themselves to the education of Jewish children in a Christian setting. Not long after Alphonse's ordination in 1850 as a Jesuit priest, he left his Order to join his brother in their shared vision. In 1852 Theodore and Alphonse led the small community of men who had gathered to share in the work to form a new congregation, the male branch of the Congregation of Our Lady of Sion.

The Ratisbonne brothers obtained permission to work as missionaries in Jerusalem. There Alphonse went to establish a convent for the Sisters to carry out their mission in the heart of the Jewish homeland. The Sisters arrived in Jerusalem in 1856, while he sought to purchase the ruined Church of Ecce Homo to serve as their home. The Sisters then devoted their lives to hastening the "fulfilment of the promises concerning the Jews and the Gentiles" while avoiding all proselytism through the education of girls regardless of creed. Ratisbonne's directive was: "Remain firm in your own faith without attempting to impose it on others."

The esteem Ratisbonne received from Pope Gregory was shared by his successors. He was honored repeatedly by Pope Pius IX and was named a Protonotary Apostolic by Pope Leo XIII.

=== Death ===
On his deathbed, Ratisbonne received the Last Sacraments from the Archbishop of Paris, Joseph Hippolyte Guibert, and a final blessing from Pope Leo XIII. He died in Paris on 10 January 1884.

== Published works ==
Ratisbonne was the author of, among other works:

- An Essay on Moral Education (1828)
- A Life of Saint Bernard (1841)
- Meditations of Saint Bernard on the Present and Future (1853)
- A Manual for Christian Mothers (1860)
- The Jewish Question (1868)
- A new Manual for Christian Mothers (1870)
- The Pope (1870)
- Gospel Tidbits (1872)
- A Response to Questions from an Israelite of our Time (1878)
- Mes souvenirs, Sources de Sion, Presses monastiques, rééd (1966)
