= Convent of the Sisters of Zion =

Roman Catholic convent in the Old City of Jerusalem

- Interactive map of Convent of the Sisters of Zion

Monastery information
- Order: Congregation of Notre-Dame de Sion
- Denomination: Roman Catholic
- Established: 1857
- Controlled churches: Church of Ecce Homo (Basilica of Ecce Homo)

People
- Founder: Marie-Alphonse Ratisbonne

Architecture
- Groundbreaking: 1858
- Completed date: 1862

Site
- Location: Old City, near the eastern end of the Via Dolorosa
- Country: Jerusalem
- Coordinates: 31.780323°N 35.233361°E
- Visible remains: Struthion Pool; northern arch of the Ecce Homo arch; Roman flagstone pavement (Lithostrotos)
- Public access: Guesthouse and library

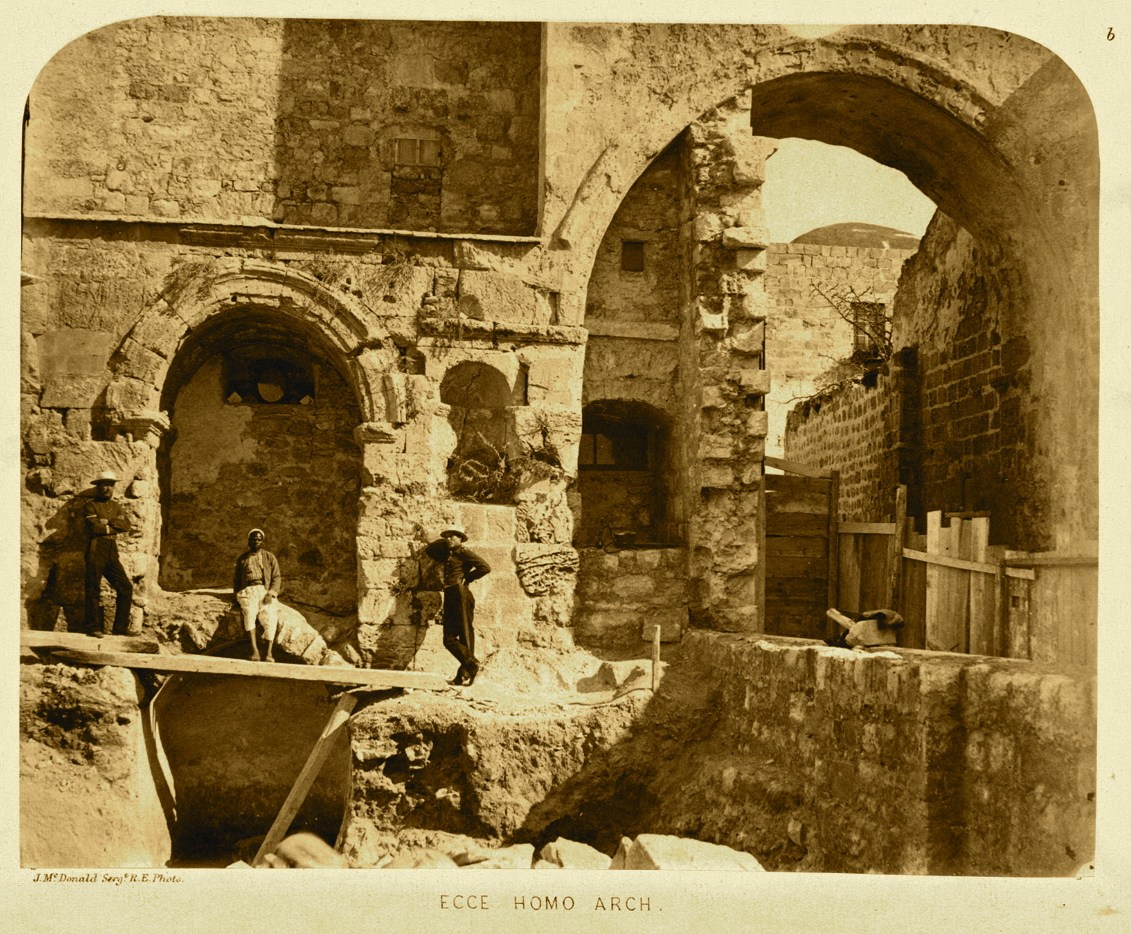
The remaining two arches of the gateway in 1864; the smaller arch (left) was incorporated in the Church of Ecce Homo.

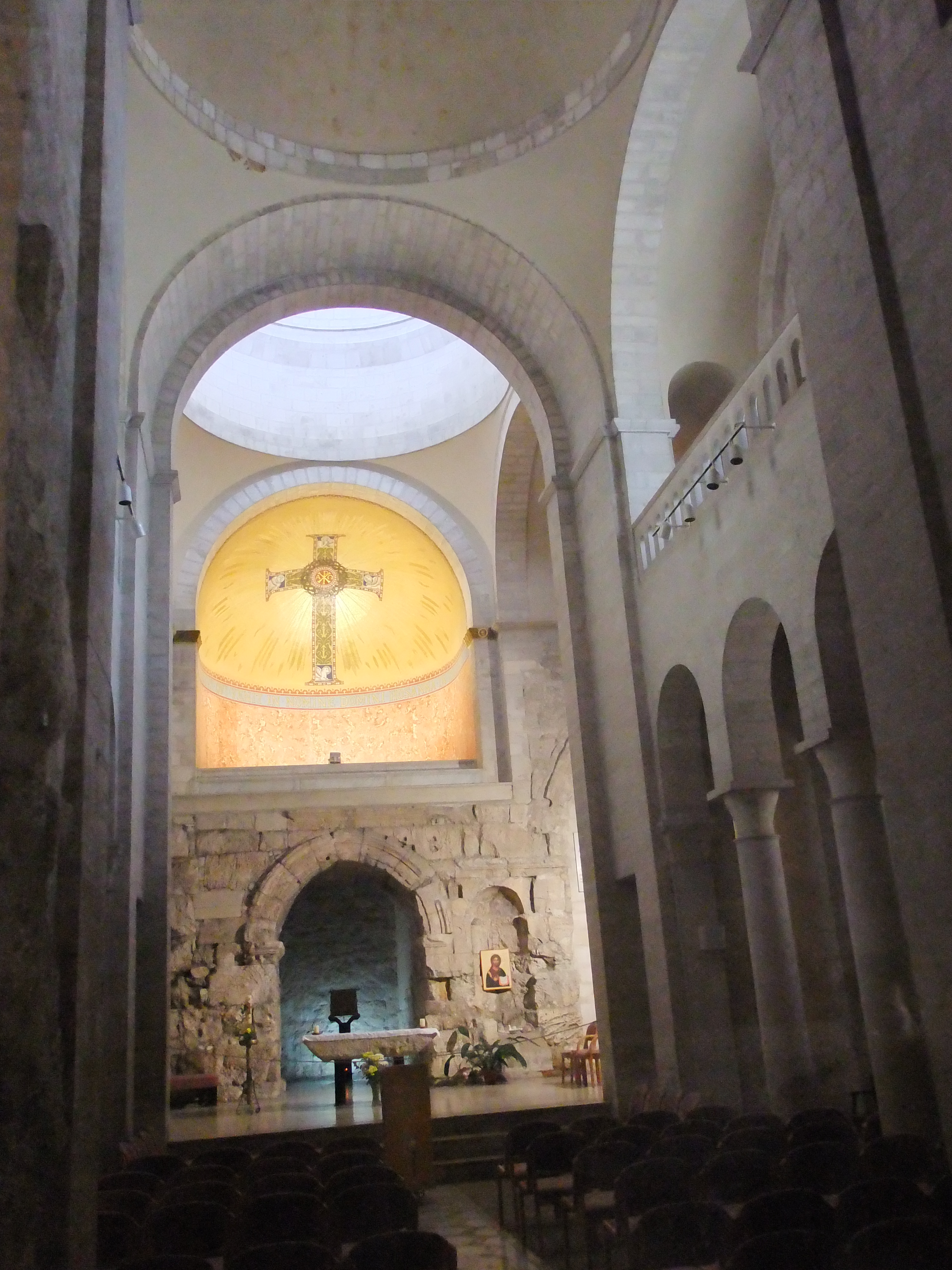
The interior of the Church of Ecce Homo preserves the northern arch of the Aelia Capitolina's eastern forum gateway under its apse.

The Convent of the Sisters of Zion is a Roman Catholic convent of the Congregation of Notre-Dame de Sion, located near the eastern end of the Via Dolorosa in the Old City of Jerusalem. The convent was built in 1857 by Marie-Alphonse Ratisbonne. The site includes the Church of Ecce Homo, also known as the Basilica of Ecce Homo, named for Pontius Pilate's Ecce homo speech, which is traditionally thought to have been delivered on the pavement below the church.

== History ==
In the first century BC, Herod the Great built a large open-air pool. In the second century, Roman Emperor Hadrian added arched vaulting to enable pavement to be placed over the pool, making it a large cuboid cistern to gather rainwater from guttering on the forum buildings. On the surface, Hadrian built a triple-arched gateway as an entrance to the eastern forum of the Aelia Capitolina in Jerusalem. The northern arch is preserved under the apse of the Basilica of Ecce Homo.

By 1857, Marie-Alphonse Ratisbonne, a French Jew and former atheist who converted to Catholicism and became a priest, decided to purchase the site and start a convent. Between 1858 and 1862, he built a basilica (the Church of Ecce Homo), which overlaps part of the gateway arch. He also built an orphanage for girls and other standard convent buildings. A school for girls was added, with boarders coming from all over the Arab world until 1967. As the convent was confined in size, the nuns bought a few of the surrounding Arab homes and incorporated them into the convent; they soon opened a medical dispensary on the site. Due to the introduction of state support for orphans by the Ottoman government and, later (1948), by the Israeli government, the orphanage buildings have been used for other religious purposes since 1967. The convent now maintains a guesthouse and library.

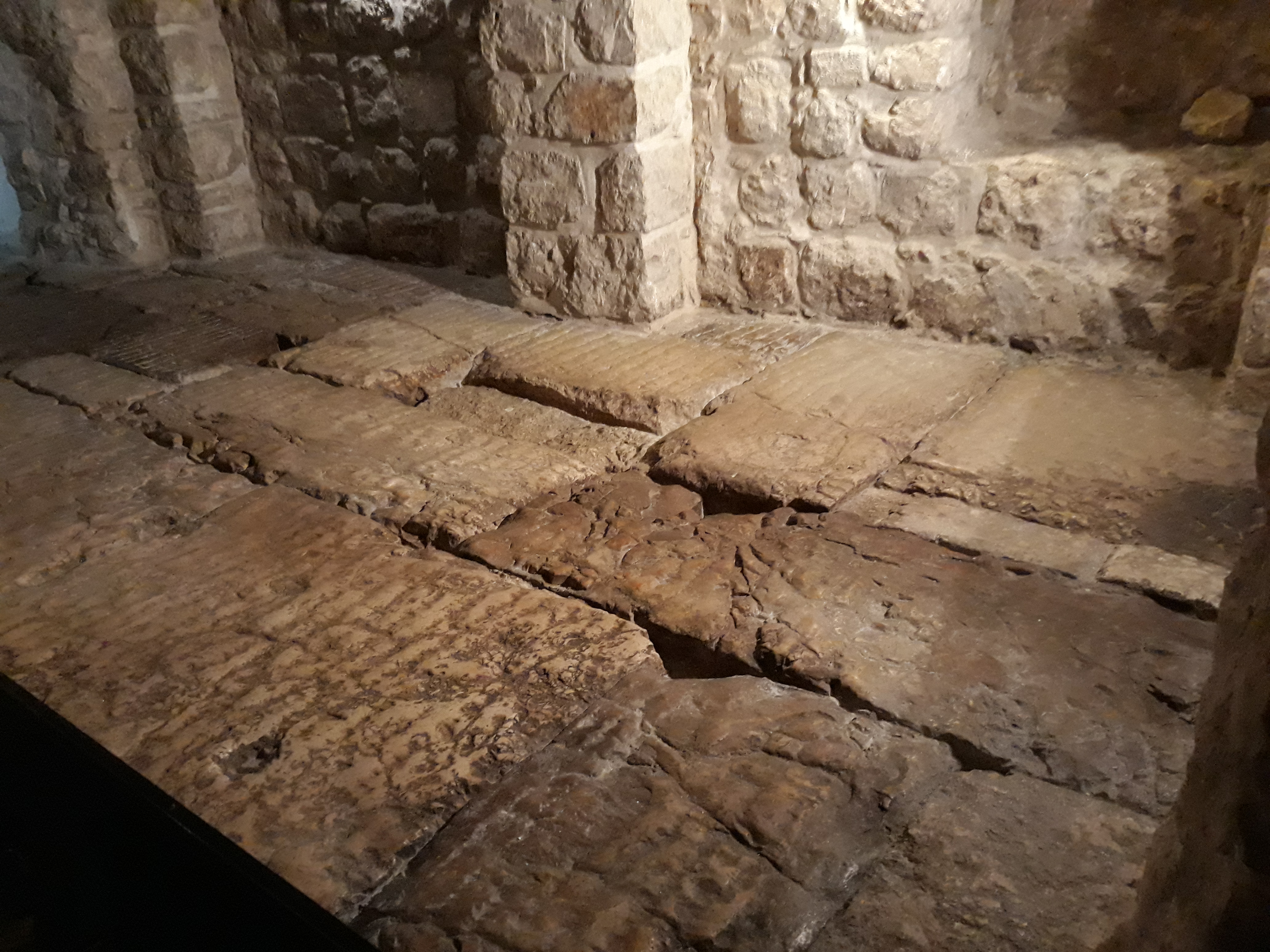
Lithostrotos: Roman pavement once thought to be the site of Jesus' trial.

Beneath the convent is an extensive area of Roman flagstones. As these continue, to a lesser extent, under the Church of the Condemnation, they have been known for several centuries. Due in part to an etching of a game by Roman soldiers discovered in 1864 involving the execution of a "mock king", the flagstones were thought by nuns to be those of Gabbatha, which John 19:13 describes as the location where Pontius Pilate adjudged Jesus' trial. It is possible that, following its destruction, the Antonia Fortress's pavement tiles were brought to Hadrian's plaza.

== See also ==
- Aelia Capitolina
- Antonia Fortress
- Church of the Flagellation
- Ecce homo
- Gabbatha
- Struthion Pool
