= Marie-Alphonse Ratisbonne =

French priest and missionary

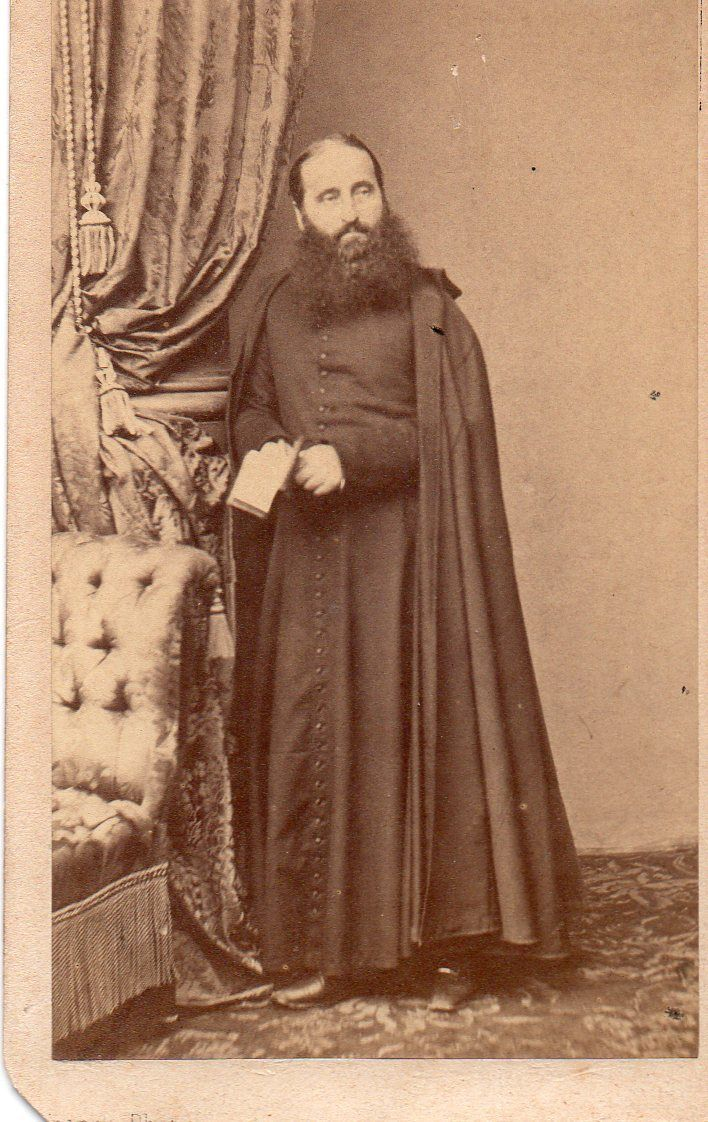
Father Ratisbonne in 1865

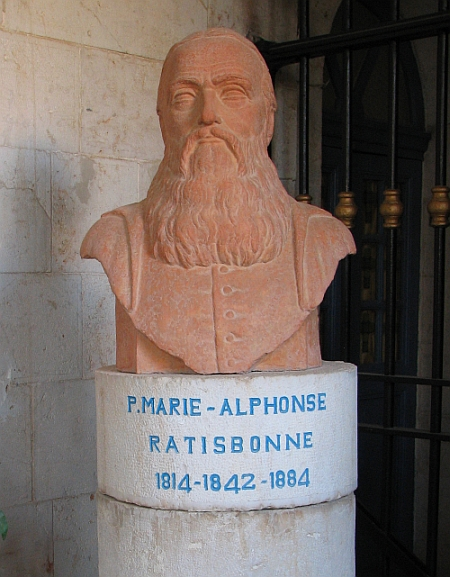
Bust of Marie Alphonse Ratisbonne at Ratisbonne Monastery, Jerusalem

Marie-Alphonse Ratisbonne, NDS (1 May 1814, Strasbourg, Alsace, France – 6 May 1884, Ein Karem, Mutasarrifate of Jerusalem, Ottoman Empire) was a French Jew who converted to Christianity and became a Jesuit priest and missionary. He later was a co-founder of the Congregation of Our Lady of Sion, a religious congregation dedicated to the conversion of Jews to the Christian faith.

== Biography ==
He was born 1 May 1814 in Strasbourg, Alsace, France, the eleventh of the thirteen children born to Auguste Ratisbonne and his wife, Adélaïde Cerfbeer, members of the famed family of Jewish bankers. His father was the president of the Provincial Council of Alsace. His mother died when he was 4 years old, but his natural charm drew his wider family to take charge of his upbringing. The family was assimilated into the secular society of France, but had a strong sense of social justice, with which value he was raised. An older brother, Théodore, converted to Christianity in 1827 and went on to become a Catholic priest in 1830.

== Religious conversion ==
After studying law in Paris, Alphonse joined the family bank and announced his engagement to his 16-year-old niece. In January 1842, with the postponement of the marriage due to the bride's age, he traveled to Rome for a pleasure trip. On 20 January, he entered the Church of Sant'Andrea delle Fratte, where he experienced a vision of the Virgin Mary. Due to this experience, he was led to be baptised in the Catholic Church. At his baptism, he added Marie (Mary) to his name to reflect the role he felt she had played in his life.

Alphonse returned to Paris to proclaim his new-found faith to his fiancée, and invited her to share it with him. His niece, however, tearfully rejected this. In June of that same year he entered the Society of Jesus and was ordained as a priest in 1848.

== Missionary work ==
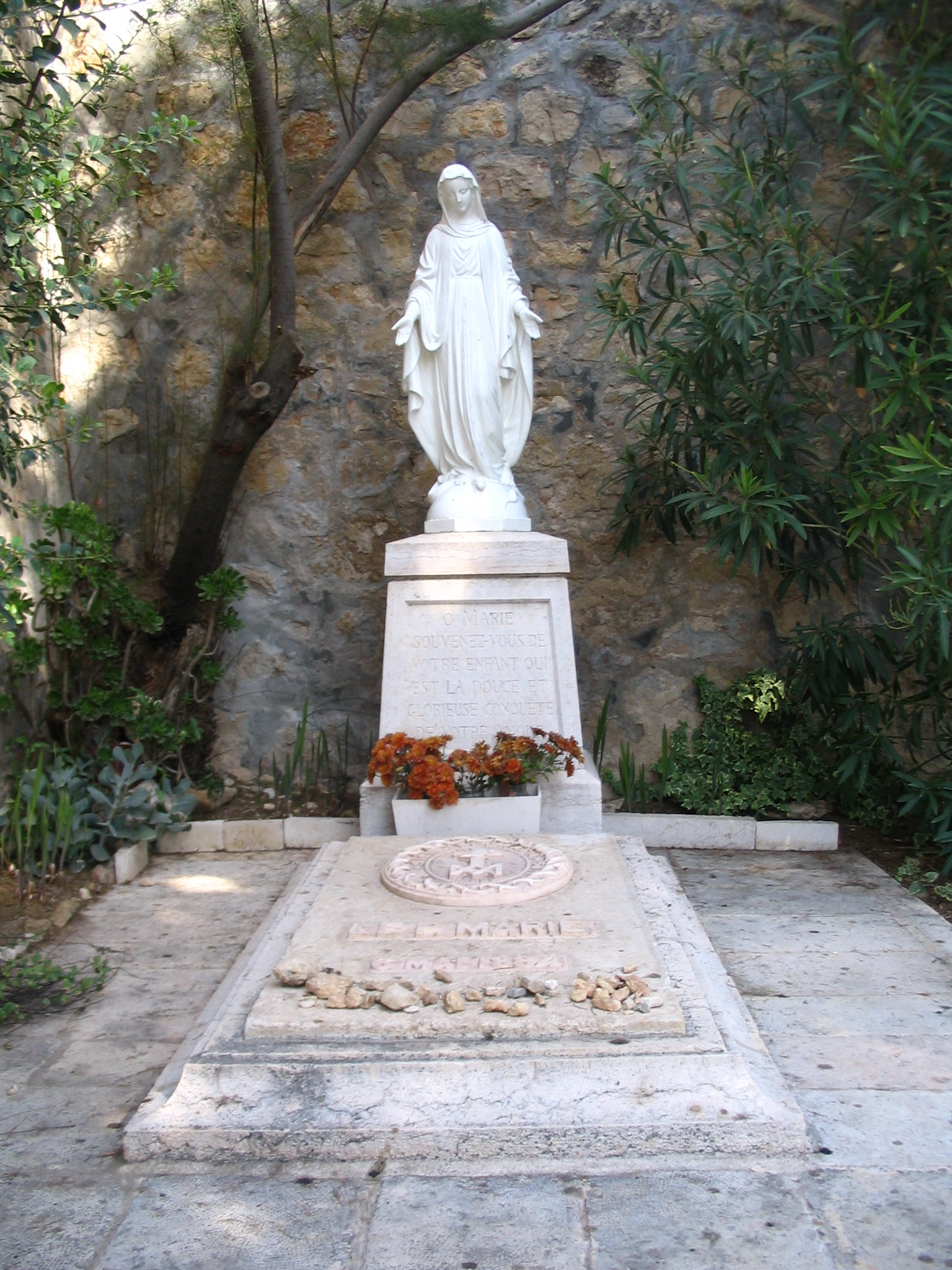
Marie-Alphonse Ratisbonne's tomb in Ein Karem

After his own conversion, Théodore Ratisbonne had been drawn to work for the conversion of his fellow Jews to the Christian faith. This proposed ministry, also the inspiration of Alphonse, was blessed by Pope Gregory XVI in the course of a visit by Théodore Ratisbonne to Rome in 1842. Théodore then took up the suggestion made to him by Alphonse to establish a school for Jewish children in a Christian setting. At this time, two Jewish sisters came to him for spiritual advice, and eventually also converted to Christianity. They became the nucleus for the Congregation of Our Lady of Sion, founded in 1847.

In 1850, Alphonse became engaged in mission work among convicts in the prisons of Brest, but two years later he felt called to join his brother in this mission to their own people, writing that he "recognized that the will of God in my Conversion and in my vocation to the priesthood obviously destined me to work for the salvation of Israel. With the authorization of the Jesuit Superior General, Jan Philipp Roothaan, and the blessing of Pope Pius IX, Alphonse left the Society of Jesus to join his brother. The two brothers, with several other priests drawn to their mission, formed the male branch of the Congregation in 1852. Alphonse moved to Palestine in 1855 to open a convent for the Sisters of the congregation. He would spend the rest of his life there.

In 1858, Ratisbonne established the Convent of Ecce Homo in the Old City of Jerusalem for the Sisters of Sion. In 1860, he built the Convent of St John on a hilltop in Ein Karem, then a village on the outskirts of Jerusalem. In 1874, he founded the Ratisbonne Monastery for the priests of the congregation. It is now a Salesian study center in Jerusalem's Rehavia neighborhood. Ratisbonne died in Ein Karem on 6 May 1884 and is buried in the cemetery of the convent.

== Published work ==
- Monument à la gloire de Marie (1847)

== Bibliography ==
- MONDESERT, Claude: Théodore et Marie-Alphonse Ratisbonne, (3 vol.), Paris, 1903-1904.
- MONDESERT, Claude: Les religieuses de Notre-Dame de Sion, Paris, 1923.
- EGAN, M.J.: Our Lady's Jew: Father Marie-Alphonse Ratisbonne, Dublin, 1953.
- GUITTON, Jean: La conversion de Ratisbonne, Paris, 1964.
- LAURENTIN, René:Alphonse Ratisbonne, vie authentique, Paris, 1984.

== See also ==
Norman Russell. The Conversion of Marie-Alphonse Ratisbonne. A New Translation from the 2nd Edition of 1842. With Notes, Introduction and Appendices. London: Grosvenor House Publishing 2013
