= Ratisbonne Monastery =

Building in Jerusalem

Coordinates: 31.77792°N 35.214371°E

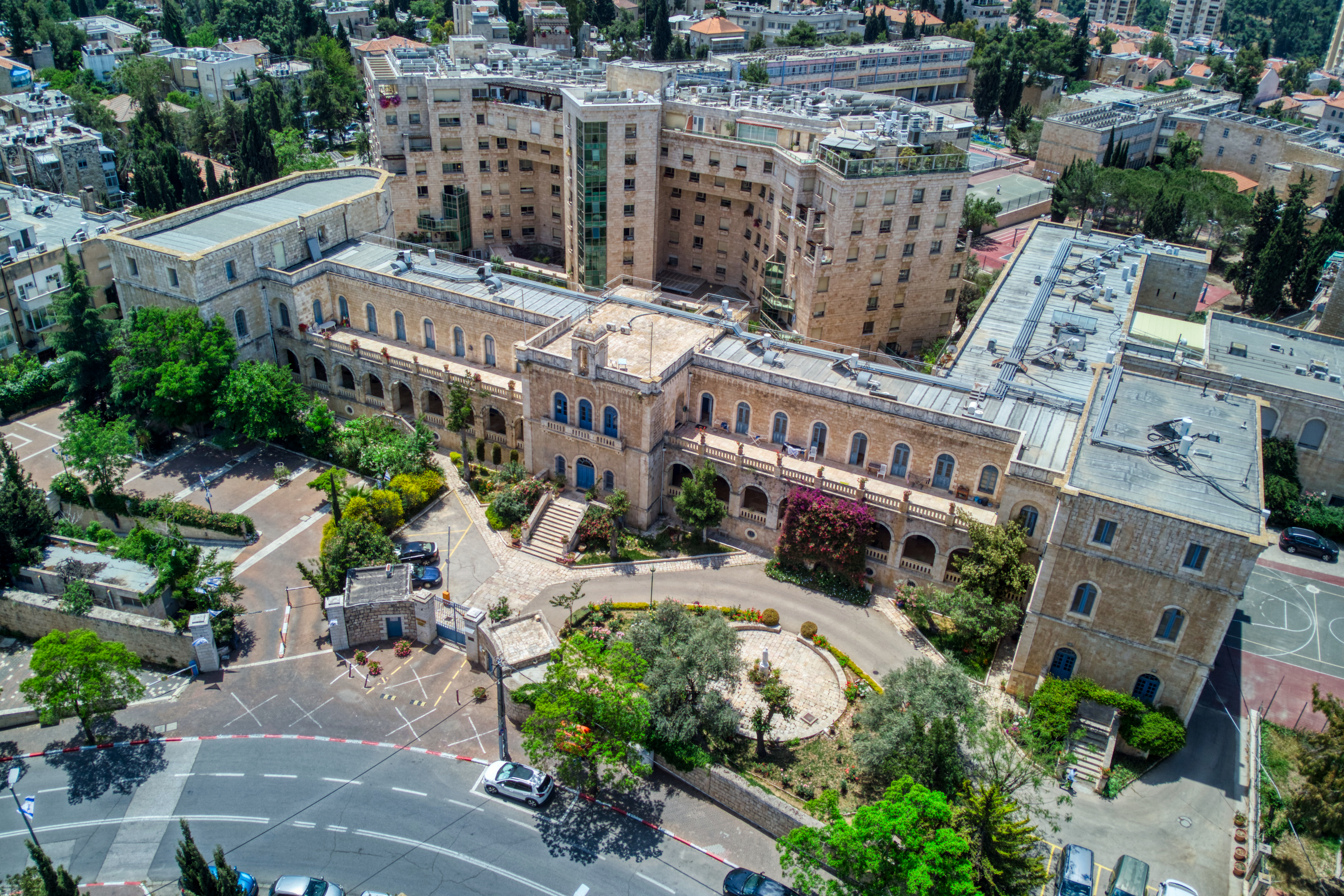
Ratisbonne monastery, Jerusalem

Ratisbonne Monastery (Arabic: دير راتسبون, Hebrew: מנזר רטיסבון) is a monastery in the Rehavia neighborhood of Jerusalem, established by Marie-Alphonse Ratisbonne, a French convert from Judaism. Work on the building, designed by the French architect M. Daumat, began in 1874 on a barren hill, now in the center of West Jerusalem.

== History ==
In 1843, together with his older brother Marie-Theodore, himself also a convert to Catholicism, Marie-Alphonse Ratisbonne founded the Congregation of Our Lady of Sion. The aim was to bring about a better understanding between Jews and Christians and to convert Jews. In 1855 he went to Palestine, where he spent the rest of his life working for the conversion of Jews and Muslims. In 1856 he established the Ecce Homo convent for the Sisters of Zion on Via Dolorosa in the Old City. In 1874, he founded the St Pierre de Sion Orphanage in the grounds of this convent. The Institute began as a primary school that also taught languages: French, English, Arabic and Hebrew. Along with this, there was also technical training for those who needed it. The house was dedicated to the service of the local population, and was animated by a spirit that was open to all: Jews and Arabs, both Christian and Muslim.

Ratisbonne's goal was to have a vocational school for about 200 pupils. The space available being insufficient, he soon decided to move it to the New City. In 1874 he acquired a plot of land on a hill from a Greek Orthodox Christian to the West of the Old City, not far from Jaffa Gate. The plans were prepared by M. Daumat, and funds came from donations. Construction began the same year. At the death of Ratisbonne in 1884, however, only half of the front building had been completed. By 1917, only the front and the north wing had been built.

== Architectural features ==
A prominent feature of the building was the small tower in the centre of the front wing. The rooms and halls in the cellar were used as store-rooms and workshops for the various crafts, as well as for the kitchen and dining room. There were classrooms and other workshops on the first floor. The second floor was mainly residential. The rectangular church on the south side was three stories high (about 21 m.). A number of structures were put up in the courtyard: store-rooms, a cowshed, a stable, a pigsty, a chicken coop, a laundry, as well as living quarters for the housekeeper, gatekeeper and gardener.

Today the external structures are no more, except for a cottage occupied by a "protected tenant". The property on the north side was probably leased out for the building of apartment blocks, as was, later, the property on the south side. However, the "Turkish Tower" still exists, and is probably the oldest structure on the property.

== Refugees ==
Jewish refugee children in Ratisbonne courtyard

In May 1948, the monastery opened its gates to women and children evacuated from Gush Etzion before they were moved to Kibbutz Ma'ale HaHamisha. The children lived in the cellar, with the constant smell of wine coming in from the wine cellar. The yard had a tin shack for showering and laundry. Water was distributed from wells in the yard that were kept locked. The water was used sparingly and recycled as far as possible from bathing to laundry to washing the floor. Life was organized as in a kibbutz: girls worked in the kitchen and laundry, and in child care. A corner of the yard was fenced in for cows.

== Site of negotiations between the Vatican and Israel ==
Both because of its location and because of the historical services rendered by the Monastery, it was chosen without hesitation by both parties as the site for the negotiations between the Holy See and the State of Israel, leading to the accord signed in 1993. The present Director's Office is the room where the negotiations actually took place, as a photo (dated 1994) preserved there bears witness. In the photo may be seen the then-Cardinal Joseph Ratzinger and the Latin Patriarch of Jerusalem, Msgr. Michel Sabbah.

== Centre Chrétien d’Études Juives (CCEJ) ==
After the creation of the State of Israel, the Ratisbonne Institute gradually became a centre of study for Christians interested in Jewish studies. In 1970, it was opened more specifically to the international and ecumenical dimensions. In order to ensure permanence and growth, in 1984 the Congregation of the Religious of Our Lady of Sion requested and obtained the intervention of the Holy See which became the holder of the property. The Catholic Institute of Paris assumed academic responsibility for the Institute, now called “Institut Saint-Pierre de Sion – Ratisbonne, Centre Chrétien d’Études Juives” (CCEJ). In June 1995, Msgr. Andre di Montezemolo, apostolic nuncio in Israel, was asked by the Holy See to supervise the elaboration of the definitive structure of the Institute on the juridical, academic and economic levels. The Institute began to receive students from a wide variety of churches, who were also given accommodation.

The Institute took its inspiration from the teaching of the Second Vatican Council, which in Nostra aetate n. 4 affirms: given such a great spiritual patrimony common to Christians and Jews, the Council wants to encourage and recommend mutual esteem and knowledge, born of biblical and theological studies as well as from fraternal dialogue. The Institute therefore wanted to provide to Catholics and other Christians the possibility of knowing and studying the religious tradition of Israel, its sources (prayer, commentaries on Scripture, midrash, mishnah, Talmud, history, etc.), in living contact with the Jewish people, in the context of dialogue and cooperation between the church and the Jewish people. The Institute maintained relations with faculties, religious and ecclesiastical institutes, and all university institutions or pastoral centres of study that were interested in giving their students a formation and specialization in Jewish studies, and preparing future teachers in this area.

The teaching body of the Institute consisted of Christians who have experience of collaboration with Jewish institutes of study and research, chiefly the Hebrew University of Jerusalem. There is also visiting and invited staff and lecturers, both Christians and Jews. Theology students of the second cycle could obtain a Certificate in Jewish Studies within a year, and a Diploma in Jewish Studies with a second year. This diploma can be credited to these students within their regular course of study. Agreements to this effect exist with the Faculty of Theology of the Catholic Institute of Paris, with that of Toronto.

In 1996, the Centre (CCEJ) began publishing the Cahiers Ratisbonne. In 1998, the Centre became a Pontifical Institute. Three years later, in 2001, the Congregation for Catholic Education decreed that the Pontifical Center of Jewish Studies at Ratisbonne be closed. The Centre was transferred to the Pontifical Gregorian University in Rome, and incorporated with the Centro Cardinal Bea per gli Studi Giudaici. The Fathers of Sion retained the north wing of the monastery, where the CCEJ continues to function. The Centre has a small library; the books left behind in the original library in the main building were taken over and incorporated in the library of the STS (see below).

== Studium Theologicum Salesianum ==
In 2004, the Vatican asked the Salesians of Don Bosco to take over the monastery. The Salesians accepted this pressing request, and moved their studentate (student community) of theology from Cremisan to the monastery. The study centre was set up as the Studium Theologicum Salesianum (STS) "Saints Peter and Paul" and affiliated to the Salesian Pontifical University, Rome in 2004. In 2005, the decision was made to change the medium of instruction from Italian to English.

The present STS library consists of holdings from Cremisan as well as those left it by the Fathers of Sion (the priestly congregation of the Congregation of Our Lady of Sion). The books are largely in Italian and French, but efforts are being made to update the English holdings.

The building underwent extensive internal modification when the Salesians took over.

In 2011, the STS became the Jerusalem campus of the Salesian Pontifical University, Rome.
