= Trajan's Parthian campaign =

114–17 Roman campaign in Mesopotamia

- Part of the Roman–Parthian Wars
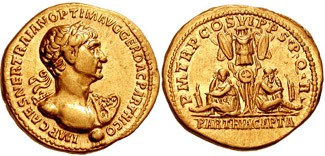
- Aureus issued by Trajan to celebrate the conquest of Parthia
Date	113/114–117
Location	Levant, Anatolia, Mesopotamia
Result	Stalemate

Belligerents
Roman Empire	Parthian Empire

Commanders and leaders
Trajan; Lusius Quietus; Parthamaspates	Osroes I Parthamasiris †

Trajan's Parthian campaign was engaged by Roman emperor Trajan from 113 to 117 against the Parthian Empire in Mesopotamia. The war was initially successful for the Romans, but a series of setbacks, including wide-scale Jewish uprisings in the Eastern Mediterranean and North Africa and Trajan's death in 117, ended in a Roman withdrawal.

In 113, Trajan decided that the moment was ripe for a final resolution of the "eastern question" by the decisive defeat of Parthia and the annexation of Armenia. His conquests marked a deliberate change of Roman policy towards Parthia and a shift of emphasis in the empire's "grand strategy". In 114, Trajan invaded Armenia; annexed it as a Roman province and killed Parthamasiris, who had been placed on the Armenian throne by his relative, Parthian king Osroes I.

In 115, the Roman emperor overran northern Mesopotamia and annexed it to Rome as well. Its conquest was deemed necessary since otherwise, the Armenian salient could be cut off by the Parthians from the south. The Romans then captured the Parthian capital, Ctesiphon, before they sailed downriver to the Persian Gulf.

However, revolts erupted that year in the Eastern Mediterranean, North Africa and northern Mesopotamia, while a major Jewish revolt broke out in Roman territory, which severely stretched Roman military resources. Trajan failed to take Hatra. Parthian forces attacked key Roman positions, and Roman garrisons at Seleucia, Nisibis and Edessa were evicted by the local populaces. Trajan subdued the rebels in Mesopotamia; installed a Parthian prince, Parthamaspates, as a client ruler and withdrew to Syria. Trajan died in 117 before he could renew the war.

Trajan's Parthian campaign is considered in different ways the climax of "two centuries of political posturing and bitter rivalry". He was the first emperor to carry out a successful invasion of Mesopotamia. His grand schemes for Armenia and Mesopotamia were ultimately "cut short by circumstances created by an incorrect understanding of the strategic realities of eastern conquest and an underestimation of what insurgency can do".

== Background ==
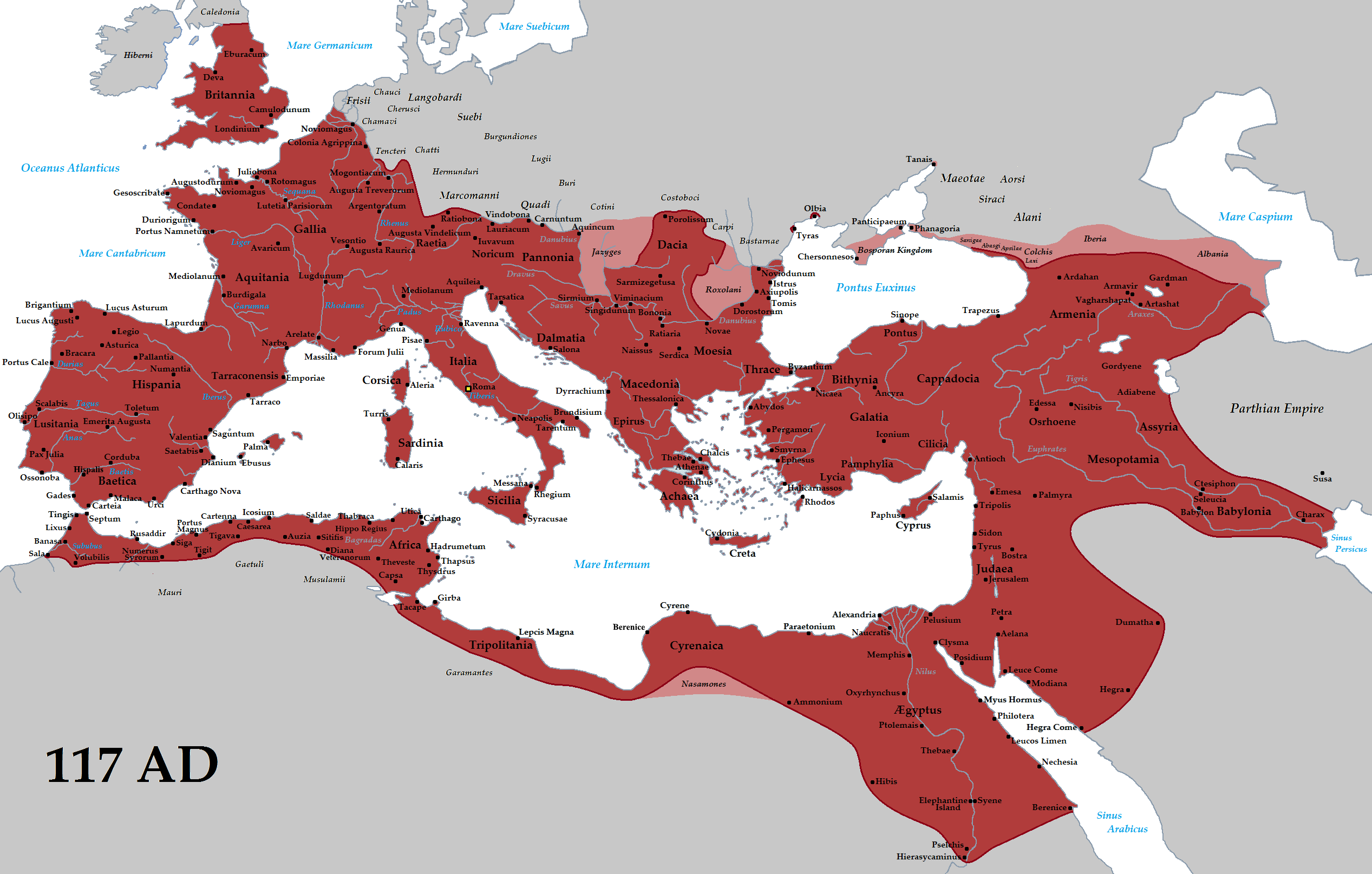
The extent of the Roman Empire under Trajan (117)

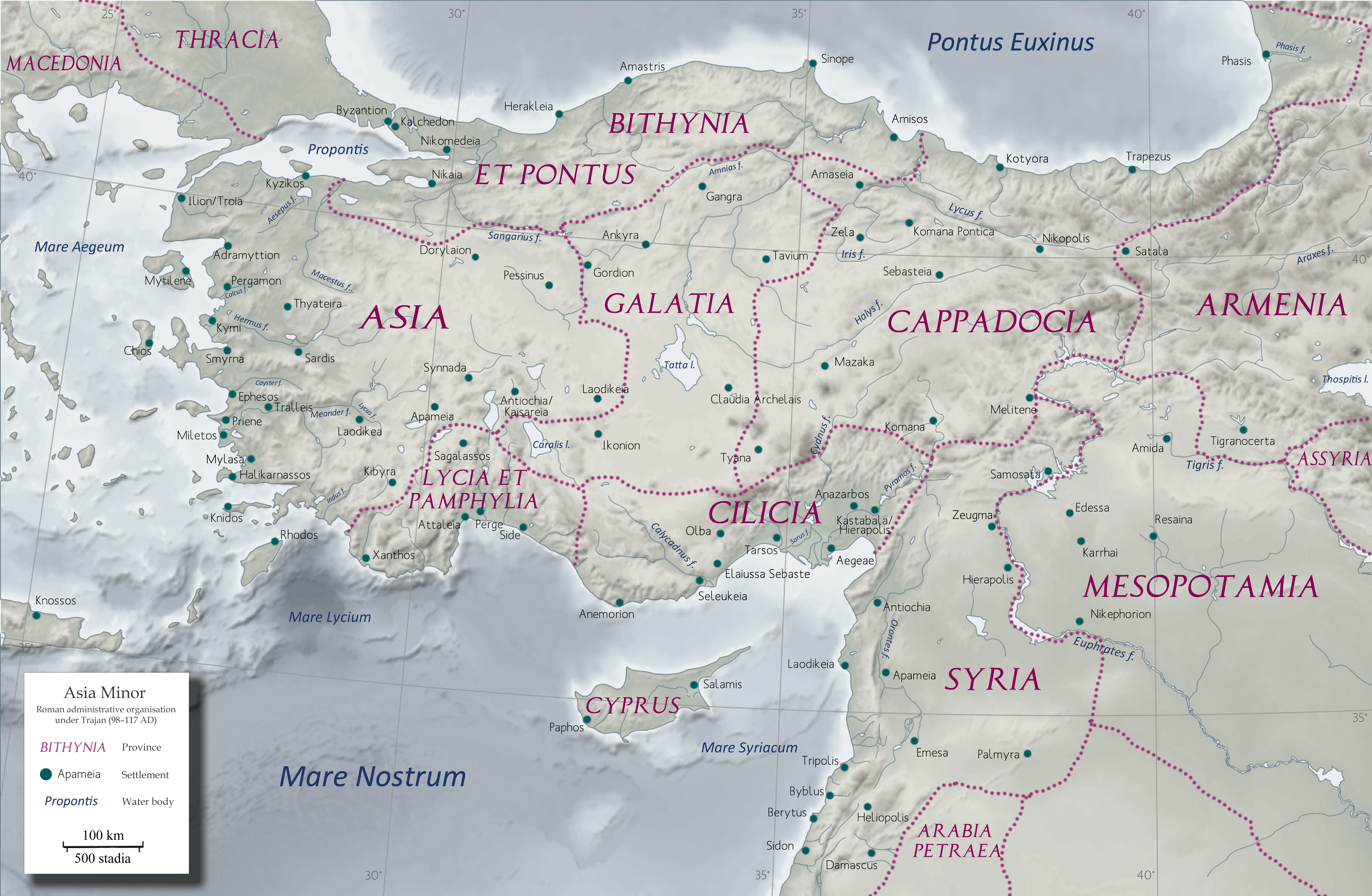
Anatolia, western Armenia and northern Levant under Trajan

In 114, Trajan embarked on his last campaign, provoked by the Parthian Empire's decision to put an unacceptable king on the throne of Armenia, a kingdom over which both empires had shared hegemony since the time of Nero, some 50 years earlier.

Many modern historians consider that Trajan's decision to wage war against Parthia might have had economic motives. After Trajan's annexation of Arabia, he built a new road, Via Traiana Nova, that went from Bostra to Aila on the Red Sea. Charax on the Persian Gulf was thus the sole remaining western terminus of the Indian trade route outside direct Roman control, which was important to lower import prices and to limit the supposed drain of precious metals created by the deficit in Roman trade with the Far East.

That Charax traded with the Roman Empire is certain since actual connections with merchants from Palmyra during the period are well documented in a contemporary Palmyrene epigraph that tells of various Palmyrene citizens honoured for holding office in Charax. Also, Charax's rulers' domains possibly then included the Bahrain islands (where a Palmyrene citizen held office, shortly after Trajan's death, as satrap, but the appointment was made by a Parthian king of Charax), which offered the possibility of extending Roman hegemony into the Persian Gulf itself. The rationale behind Trajan's campaign would then be to break down a system of Far Eastern trade through small Semitic ("Arab") cities under Parthia's control and to put it under Roman control instead.

In his Dacian conquests, Trajan had already resorted to Syrian auxiliary units, whose veterans, along with Syrian traders, had an important role in the subsequent colonization of Dacia. He had recruited Palmyrene units into his army, including a camel unit, which apparently procured Palmyrene support to his ultimate goal of annexing Charax. It has even been ventured that in his campaign, when Trajan had annexed Armenia, he was bound to annex the whole of Mesopotamia to prevent the Parthians from interrupting the flux of trade from the Persian Gulf and/or fomenting trouble at the Roman frontier on the Danube.

Other historians reject those motives, as the supposed Parthian "control" over the maritime Far Eastern trade route was at best conjectural and based on a selective reading of Chinese sources: trade by land through Parthia seems to have been unhampered by Parthian authorities and left solely to the devices of private enterprise. Commercial activity in second century Mesopotamia seems to have been a general phenomenon, shared by many peoples within and without the Roman Empire, with no sign of a concerted imperial policy towards it. As in the case of the alimenta, scholars like Moses Finley and Paul Veyne have considered the whole idea of a foreign trade "policy" behind Trajan's war anachronistic. According to them, the sole Roman concern with the Far Eastern luxuries trade, besides collecting toll taxes and customs, was moral and involved frowning upon the "softness" of luxuries but no economic policy. In the absence of conclusive evidence, trade between Rome and India might have been far more balanced in terms of quantities of precious metals exchanged. One source for the notion of the Roman gold drain, Pliny the Younger's uncle Pliny the Elder, had earlier described the Gangetic Plains as one of the gold sources for the Roman Empire. In his controversial book on the ancient economy, Finley considers Trajan's "badly miscalculated and expensive assault on Parthia" to be an example of the many Roman "commercial wars" that existed only in the books of modern historians.

The alternative view is to see the campaign as triggered by the lure of territorial annexation and prestige, which was the sole motive ascribed by Cassius Dio.

As far as territorial conquest involved collecting taxes, especially of the 25% tax levied on all goods entering the Roman Empire, the tetarte, Trajan's Parthian War could have an "economic" motive. Also, there was the propaganda value of eastern conquests that would emulate, in Roman fashion, those of Alexander the Great. The fact that emissaries from the Kushan Empire might have attended to the commemorative ceremonies for the Dacian War may have kindled in some Greco-Roman intellectuals like Plutarch, who wrote that only about 70,000 Roman soldiers were necessary to a conquest of India, and in Trajan's closer associates, speculative dreams about the booty to be obtained by reproducing Macedonian Eastern conquests.

Also, it is possible that the attachment of Trajan to an expansionist policy was supported by a powerful circle of conservative senators from Hispania committed to a policy of imperial expansion, especially the all-powerful Sura. One can explain the campaign by the fact that for the Romans, their empire was, in principle, unlimited and that Trajan only took advantage of an opportunity to make idea and reality coincide.

Finally, there are other modern historians who think that Trajan's original aims were purely military and quite modest: to assure a more defensible eastern frontier for the empire crossing Northern Mesopotamia along the course of the Khabur River to offer cover to a Roman Armenia. That interpretation is backed by the fact that all later Roman wars against Parthia aimed at establishing a Roman presence into Parthia itself.

== Timeline ==
=== Plans ===
The campaign was carefully planned in advance: ten legions were concentrated in the Eastern theatre. Since 111, the correspondence of Pliny the Younger witnesses to the fact that provincial authorities in Bithynia had to organise supplies for passing troops, and local city councils and their individual members had to shoulder part of the increased expenses by supplying troops themselves. The intended campaign, therefore, was immensely costly from its very beginning.

=== Armenia ===
Trajan marched first on Armenia, deposed the Parthian-appointed king (who was afterwards murdered while he was kept in the custody of Roman troops in an unclear incident that was later described by Fronto as a breach of Roman good faith) and annexed it to the Roman Empire as a province. He received in passing the acknowledgement of Roman hegemony by various tribes in the Caucasus and on the Eastern coast of the Black Sea, a process that kept him busy until the end of 114. At the same time, a Roman column under the legate Lusius Quietus, a cavalry general who had distinguished himself during the Dacian Wars by commanding a unit from his native Mauretania, crossed the Araxes river from Armenia into Media Atropatene and the land of the Mardians (present-day Ghilan).

It is possible that Quietus's campaign had as a goal to extend the newer more defensible Roman border eastwards towards the Caspian Sea and northwards to the foothills of the Caucasus.

=== Mesopotamia ===
The chronology of subsequent events is uncertain, but it is generally believed that in early 115, Trajan launched a Mesopotamian campaign and marched down towards the Taurus mountains to consolidate territory between the Tigris and Euphrates Rivers. He placed permanent garrisons along the way to protect army communications. While Trajan moved from west to east, Lusius Quietus moved with his army from the Caspian Sea towards the west, both armies performing a successful pincer movement whose apparent result was to establish a Roman presence into the Parthian Empire proper, with Trajan taking the northern Mesopotamian cities of Nisibis and Batnae and organizing a province of Mesopotamia, including the Kingdom of Osrhoene, where King Abgar VII submitted to Trajan publicly, as a Roman protectorate. The process seems to have been completed by 116, when coins were issued announcing that Armenia and Mesopotamia had been put under the authority of the Roman people. The area between the Khabur River and the mountains around Singara seems to have been considered as the new frontier and so received a road surrounded by fortresses.

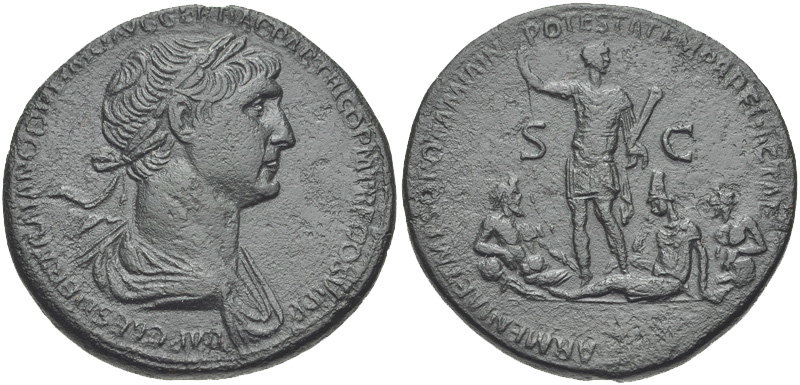
Sestertius issued by the Senate (SC, Senatus Consultus) during 116 to commemorate Trajan's Parthian victories. Obverse: bust of Trajan, with laurel crown. Caption: Trajan's titulature. Reverse: Trajan standing between prostrate allegories of Armenia (crowned with a tiara) and the Rivers Tigris & Euphrates. Caption: "Armenia & Mesopotamia put under the authority of the Roman People".

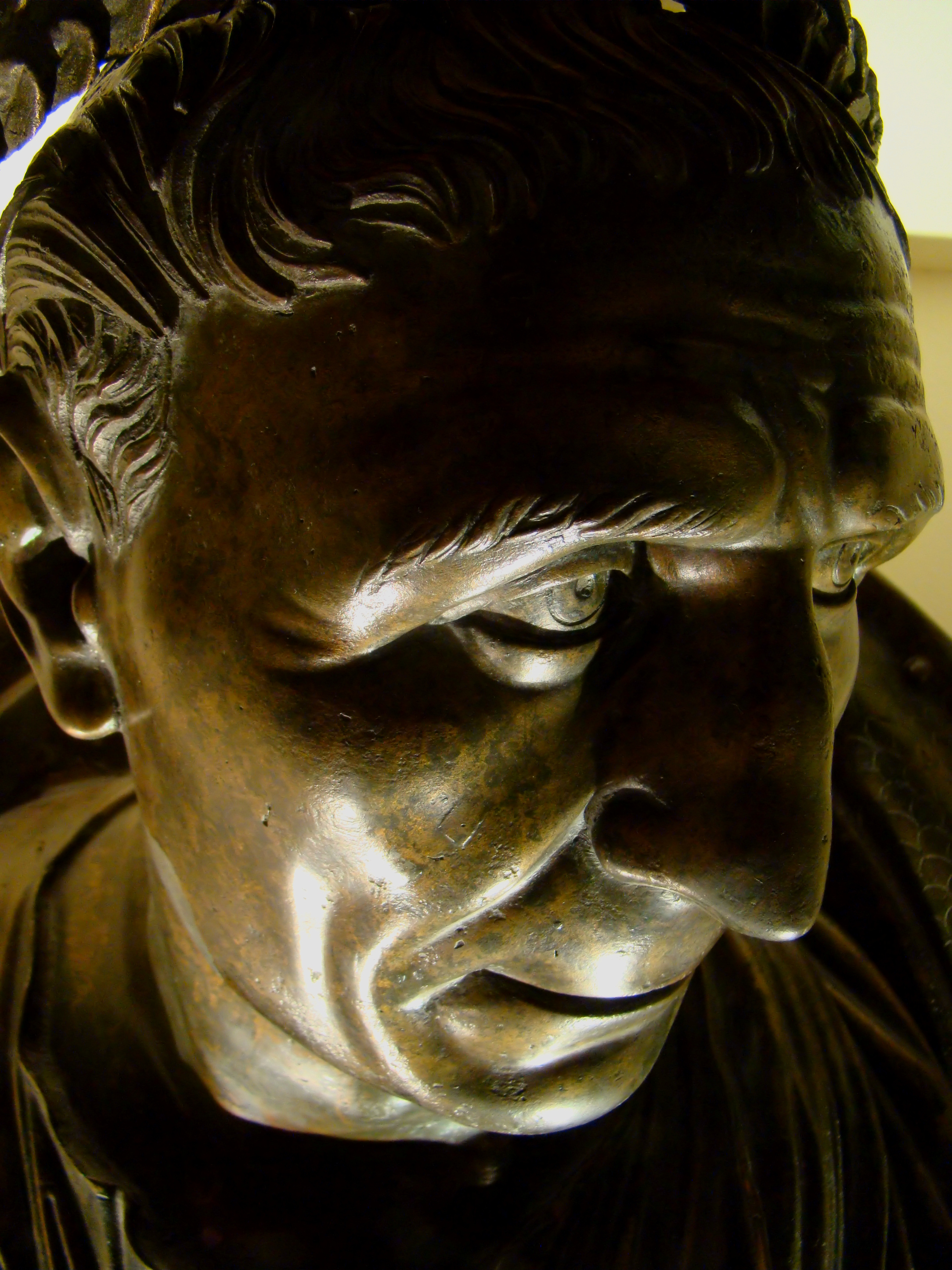
Bronze bust of Trajan in his later years, Museum of Anatolian Civilizations, Ankara, Turkey

After wintering in Antioch during 115/116 and, according to literary sources, barely escaping from a violent earthquake that claimed the life of one of the consuls, Marcus Pedo Vergilianus, Trajan again took to the field in 116, with a view to the conquest of the whole of Mesopotamia, an overambitious goal that eventually backfired on the results of his entire campaign. According to some modern historians, the aim of the campaign of 116 was to achieve a "preemptive demonstration" aiming not toward the conquest of Parthia but for tighter Roman control over the Eastern trade route. However, the overall scarcity of manpower for the Roman military establishment meant that the campaign was doomed from the start. It is noteworthy that no new legions were raised by Trajan before the Parthian campaign perhaps since the sources of new citizen recruits had already been overexploited.

As far as sources allow a description of the campaign, one Roman division seems to have crossed the Tigris into Adiabene, swept south and captured Adenystrae; a second followed the river south and captured Babylon; Trajan himself sailed down the Euphrates from Dura-Europos, where a triumphal arch was erected in his honour, through Ozogardana, where he erected a "tribunal" that was still seen during Julian the Apostate's campaigns in the same area. Having come to the narrow strip of land between the Euphrates and the Tigris, Trajan then dragged his fleet overland into the Tigris and captured Seleucia and finally the Parthian capital of Ctesiphon.

He continued southward to the Persian Gulf, and after his fleet escaped a tidal bore on the Tigris, he received the submission of Athambelus, the ruler of Charax. He declared Babylon a new province of the Empire and had his statue erected on the shore of the Persian Gulf, when he sent the Senate a laurelled letter that declared the war to be at a close and bemoaned that he was too old to go on any further and repeat the conquests of Alexander the Great.

Since Charax was a de facto independent kingdom whose connections to Palmyra were described above, Trajan's bid for the Persian Gulf may have coincided with Palmyrene interests in the region. Another hypothesis is that the rulers of Charax had expansionist designs on Parthian Babylon, which gave them a rationale for alliance with Trajan. The Parthian city of Susa was apparently also occupied by the Romans.

According to late literary sources not backed by numismatic or inscriptional evidence, a province of Assyria was also proclaimed, apparently covering the territory of Adiabene. Some measures seem to have been considered regarding the fiscal administration of Indian trade or simply about the payment of customs (portoria) on goods traded on the Euphrates and Tigris. It is possible that it was the "streamlining" of the administration of the newly-conquered lands according to the standard pattern of Roman provincial administration in tax collecting, requisitions and handling of local potentates' prerogatives that triggered later resistance against Trajan.

According to some modern historians, Trajan might have busied himself during his stay on the Persian Gulf by ordering raids on the Parthian coasts, probing into extending Roman suzerainty over the mountaineer tribes holding the passes across the Zagros Mountains into the Iranian Plateau eastward and establishing some sort of direct contact between Rome and the Kushan Empire. No attempt was made to expand into the Iranian Plateau itself, where the Roman army, with its relative weakness in cavalry, would have been at a disadvantage.

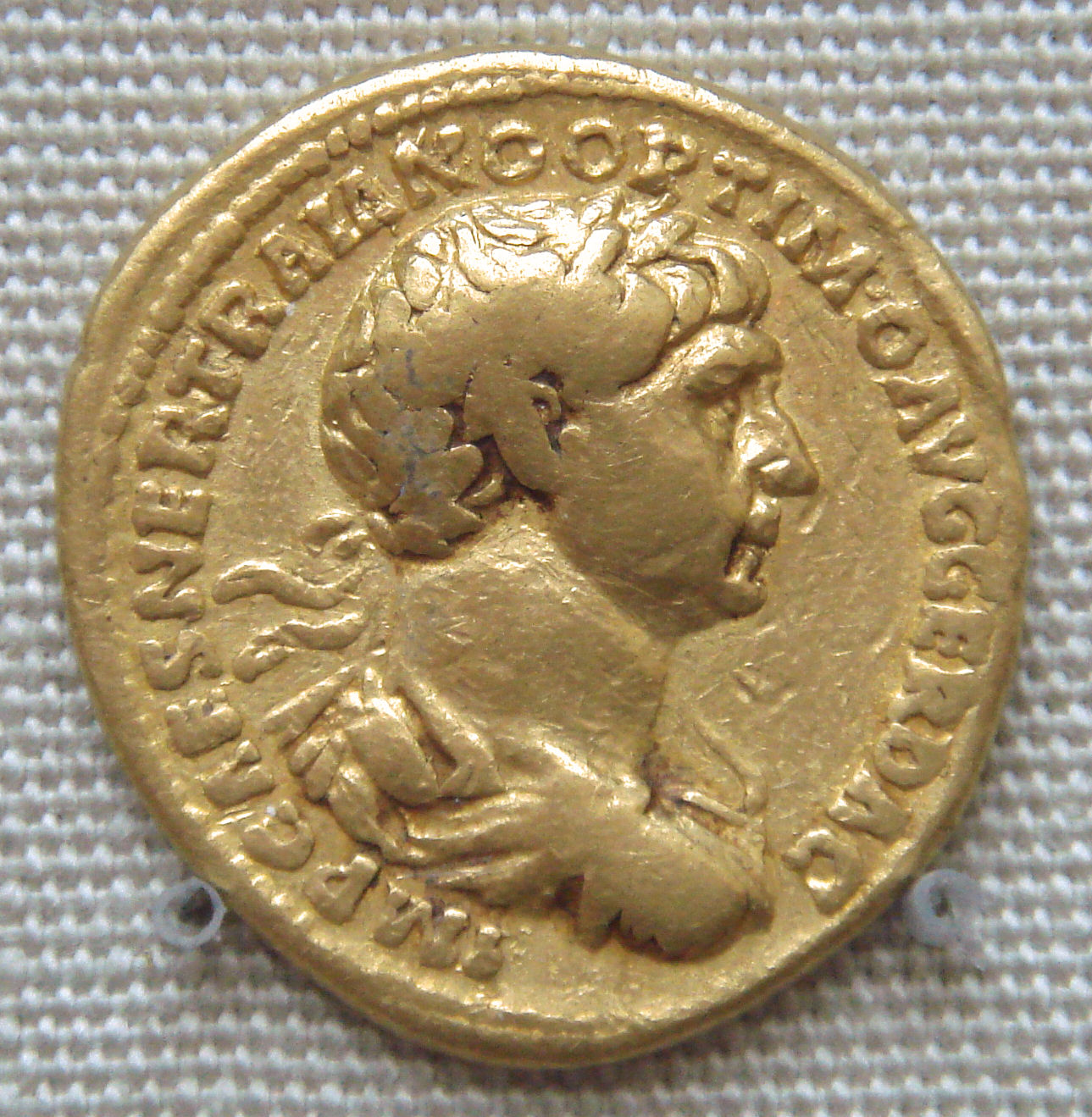
A coin of Trajan, found together with coins of the Kushan ruler Kanishka, at the Ahin Posh Buddhist Monastery, Afghanistan

However, as Trajan left the Persian Gulf for Babylon, where he intended to offer sacrifice to Alexander in the house in which he had died in 323 BC, a sudden outburst of Parthian resistance, led by a nephew of the Parthian king, Sanatruces, who had retained a cavalry force, possibly strengthened by the addition of Saka archers, imperilled Roman positions in Mesopotamia and Armenia, which Trajan sought to deal with by forsaking direct Roman rule in Parthia proper at least partially.

Trajan sent two armies towards Northern Mesopotamia. One, under Lusius Quietus, recovered Nisibis and Edessa from the rebels and probably had King Abgar deposed and killed in the process, Another, under Appius Maximus Santra, probably a governor of Macedonia, was defeated, with Santra being killed. Later in 116, Trajan, with the assistance of Quietus and two other legates, Marcus Erucius Clarus and Tiberius Julius Alexander Julianus, defeated a Parthian army in a battle in which Sanatruces was killed. After retaking and burning Seleucia, Trajan formally deposed Parthian King Osroes I and put his own puppet ruler, Parthamaspates, on the throne. That event was commemorated in a coin that was presented as the reduction of Parthia to client kingdom status: REX PARTHIS DATUS, "a king is given to the Parthians".

Trajan retreated north to retain what he could of the new provinces of Armenia, where he had already accepted an armistice in exchange for surrendering part of the territory to Sanatruces's son Vologeses and Mesopotamia.

It was then that Trajan's health started to fail him. The fortress city of Hatra, on the Tigris in his rear, continued to hold out against repeated Roman assaults. He was personally present at the siege, and it is possible that he suffered heat stroke while in the blazing heat.

=== Jewish uprising ===
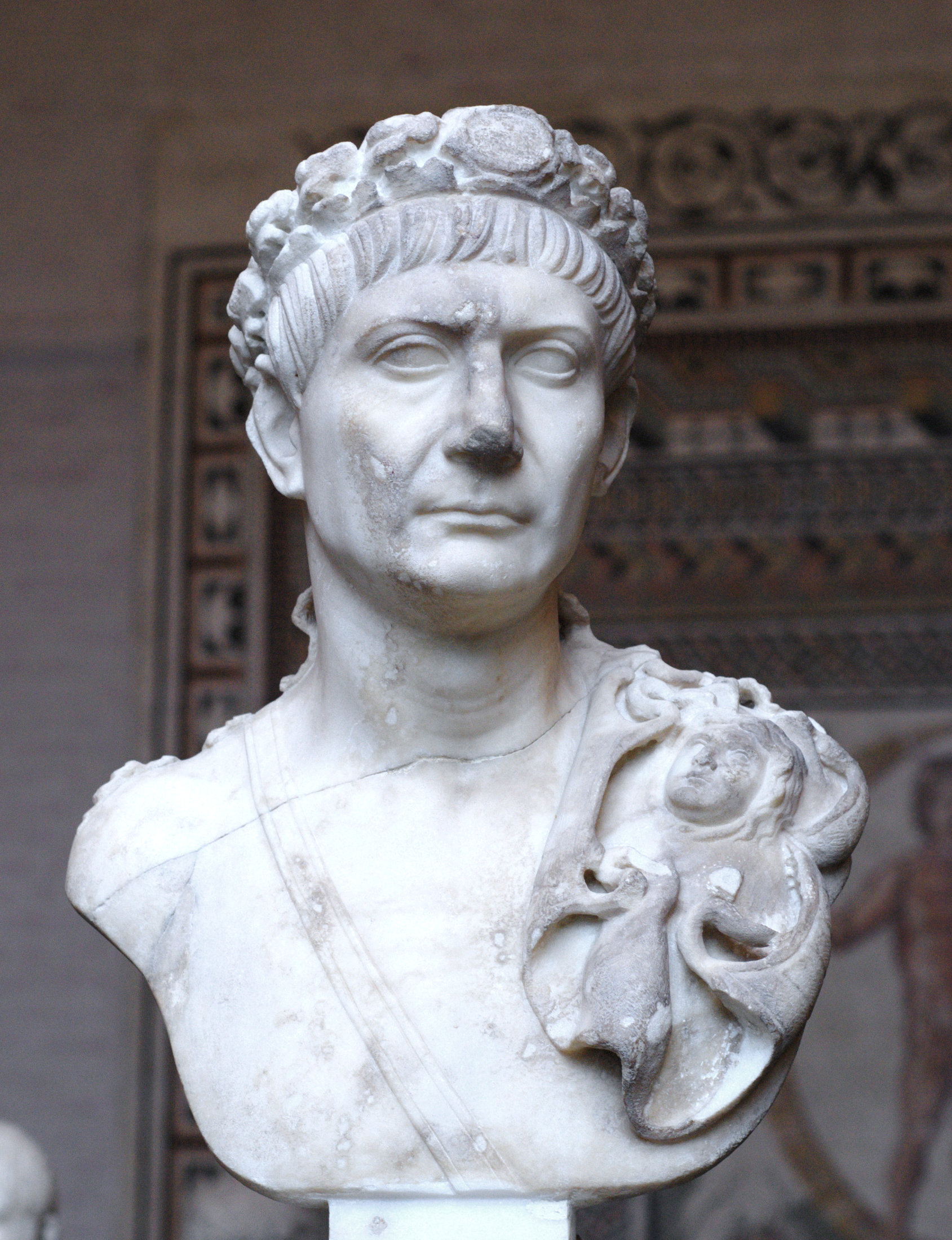
Bust of Trajan, Glyptothek, Munich

Shortly afterwards, the Jews in the Eastern Roman Empire, in Egypt, Cyprus and Cyrene, the last province being probably the original trouble hotspot, rose in what probably was an outburst of religious rebellion against the local pagans. The widespread rebellion was later called the Diaspora Revolt. Another rebellion flared up among the Jewish communities of Northern Mesopotamia, probably as part of a general reaction against Roman occupation.

Trajan was forced to withdraw his army to put down the revolts and saw the withdrawal as simply a temporary setback, but he was destined never to command an army in the field again. He turned his eastern armies over to Lusius Quietus, who had been made governor of Judaea and might have had to deal earlier with some kind of Jewish unrest in the province. Quietus discharged his commission so successfully that the Kitos War in Judaea was afterward named after him, Kitos being a corruption of Quietus.

Quietus was promised a consulate in the following year (118) for his victories, but he was killed before that could occur during the bloody purge that opened Hadrian's reign, in which Quietus and three other former consuls were sentenced to death after they had been tried on a vague charge of conspiracy by the secret court of Praetorian Prefect Attianus.

It has been theorised that Quietus and his colleagues were executed on Hadrian's direct orders out of fear of their popular standing with the army and their close connections to Trajan.

In contrast, the next prominent Roman figure in charge of the repression of the Jewish revolt, the equestrian Marcius Turbo, who had dealt with the rebel leader from Cyrene, Lukuas, retained Hadrian's trust and eventually became his Praetorian Prefect. Apparently, Hadrian could not allow the continued existence alongside him of a group of independently-minded senatorial generals inherited from his predecessor. As all four consulars were senators of the highest standing and so were generally regarded as able to take imperial power (capaces imperii), Hadrian seems to have decided on a pre-emptive strike against those prospective rivals.

=== Sources ===
As the surviving literary accounts of Trajan's Parthian War are fragmentary and scattered, it is difficult to assign them a proper context, which has led to a long-running controversy about the war's precise events and ultimate aims.

== Bibliography ==
- Bennett, Julian (2001). Trajan. Optimus Princeps. Bloomington: Indiana University Press. ISBN 978-0-253-21435-5.
- Birley, Anthony R. (2013). Hadrian: The Restless Emperor. Abingdon: Routledge. ISBN 978-0-415-16544-0.
- Bradford, Alfred S. (2001). With Arrow, Sword, and Spear: A History of Warfare in the Ancient World. Praeger Publishers.
- Choisnel, Emmanuel (2004). Les Parthes et la Route de la Soie (in French). Paris: L'Harmattan. ISBN 978-2-7475-7037-4.
- Des Boscs-Plateaux, Françoise (2005). Un parti hispanique à Rome?: ascension des élites hispaniques et pouvoir politique d'Auguste à Hadrien, 27 av. J.-C.-138 ap. J.-C (in French). Madrid: Casa de Velázquez. ISBN 978-84-95555-80-9.
- Edwell, Peter (2007). Between Rome and Persia: The Middle Euphrates, Mesopotamia and Palmyra Under Roman Control. Abingdon: Routledge. ISBN 978-0-203-93833-1.
- Finley, M.I. (1999). The Ancient Economy. Berkeley: University of California Press. ISBN 978-0-520-21946-5.
- Găzdac, Cristian (2010). Monetary Circulation in Dacia and the Provinces from the Middle and Lower Danube from Trajan to Constantine I (AD 106–337). Cluj-Napoca: Mega. ISBN 978-606-543-040-2.
- Luttwak, Edward N. (1979). The Grand Strategy of the Roman Empire: From the First Century A.D. to the Third. Baltimore: Johns Hopkins University Press. ISBN 978-0-8018-2158-5.
- Mommsen, Theodor (1999). A History of Rome Under the Emperors. London: Routledge. ISBN 978-0-203-97908-2.
- Petit, Paul (1976). Pax Romana. Berkeley: University of California Press. ISBN 978-0-520-02171-6.
- Sidebotham, Steven E. (1986). Roman Economic Policy in the Erythra Thalassa: 30 B.C. – A.D. 217. Leiden: Brill. ISBN 978-90-04-07644-0.
- Veyne, Paul (2001). La Société Romaine (in French). Paris: Seuil. ISBN 978-2-02-052360-8.
- Veyne, Paul (2005). L'Empire Gréco-Romain (in French). Paris: Seuil. ISBN 978-2-02-057798-4.
- Young, Gary K. (2001). Rome's Eastern Trade: International Commerce and Imperial Policy 31 BC – AD 305. Abingdon: Routledge. ISBN 978-0-203-47093-0.
