= Diaspora Revolt =

Second Jewish–Roman War (115–117 CE)

Diaspora Revolt Second Jewish–Roman War
- Part of the Jewish–Roman wars
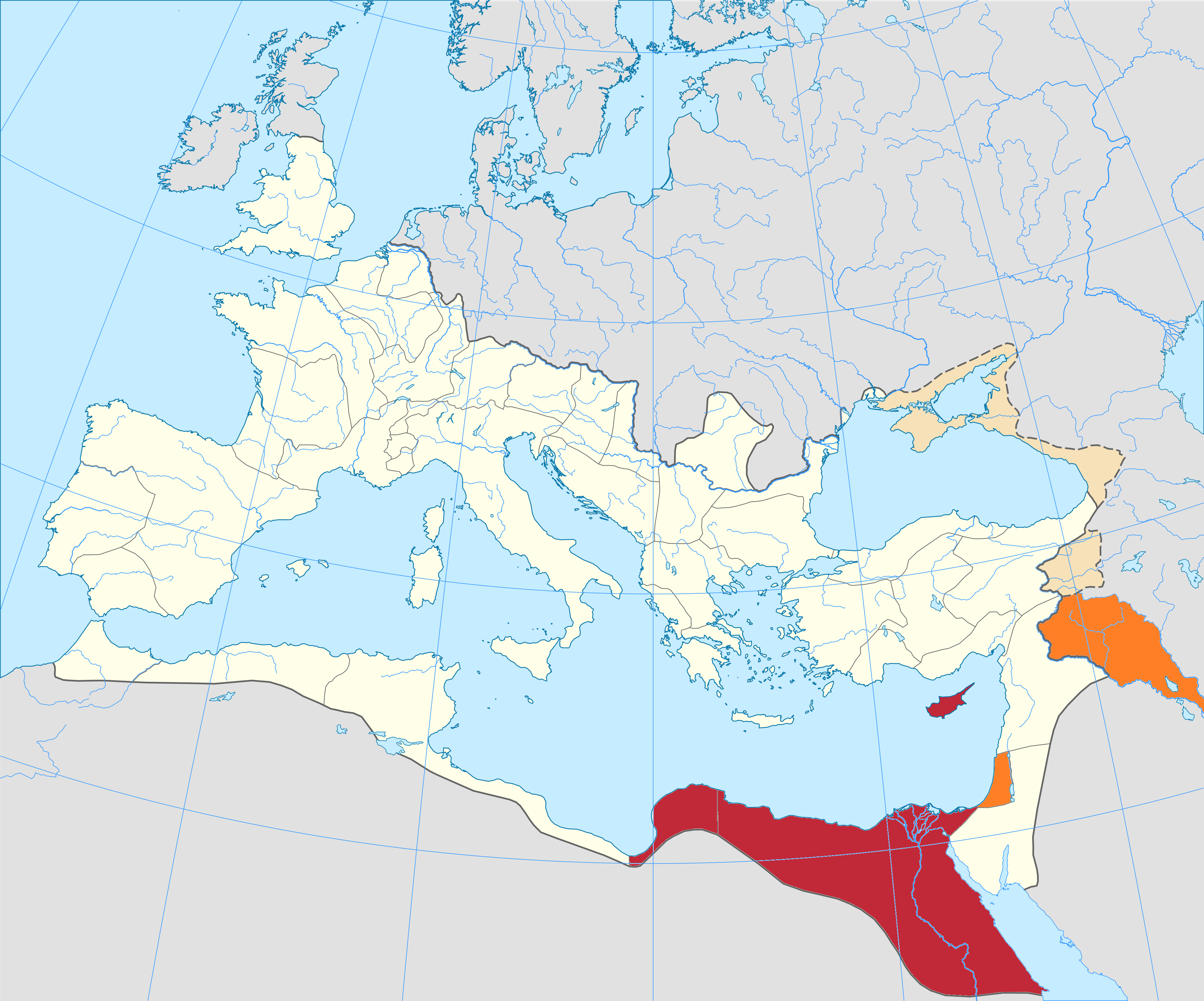
- Provinces of the Roman Empire involved in the Diaspora Revolt (117 CE)
Date	115–117 CE (with instability continuing into early 118 CE)
Location	Egypt, Cyrenaica, Cyprus, Mesopotamia (possibly), Judaea (possibly)
Result	Roman victory

Belligerents
Roman Empire: Local populations; Greek Cypriots	Jewish rebels, primarily in: Egypt; Cyrenaica; Cypriot Jews; Mesopotamia; Judaea

Commanders and leaders
Trajan #; Hadrian; Marcius Turbo; Lusius Quietus	Lukuas (surrendered); Artemio (surrendered)

The Diaspora Revolt (Note: Hebrew: מרד הגלויות, romanized: mered ha-galuyot, or מרד התפוצות, mered ha-tfutzot, 'rebellion of the diaspora'; Latin: Tumultus Iudaicus)) (115–117 CE), sometimes known as the Second Jewish–Roman War, (Note: This term is also used for the later Bar Kokhba Revolt, which was fought between the Jews of Judaea and the Romans circa 132–136 CE.) was a series of uprisings launched by Jewish diaspora communities in several eastern provinces of the Roman Empire during the final years of Emperor Trajan's reign. Hostilities began while Trajan was engaged in his Parthian campaign in Mesopotamia, creating a favorable opportunity for rebellion. Ancient sources do not specify the motivations, but they were likely shaped by the Roman destruction of the Second Temple during the First Jewish Revolt in 70 CE, long-standing tensions between Jews and Greeks, the fiscus Judaicus tax, messianic expectations, and hopes for a return to the Jewish homeland, Judaea.

The uprisings broke out almost simultaneously in Egypt, Cyrenaica, and Cyprus. Rebel attacks were directed mainly against locals rather than Roman authorities, with ancient authors such as Cassius Dio and Eusebius, as well as epigraphic evidence, reporting extreme violence. There is also a reference in Eusebius to Roman actions against Jews in Mesopotamia, though these events appear to have formed part of a broader local resistance to the Roman invasion of the Parthian Empire, rather than another Jewish uprising.

Marcius Turbo, one of Trajan's top generals, was dispatched to suppress the uprisings in Egypt and Cyrenaica. Literary sources suggest that the Jewish population in these regions faced severe reprisals. Meanwhile, General Lusius Quietus quelled the rebellion in Mesopotamia and was subsequently appointed governor of Judaea. It was during this period that the poorly understood Kitos War may have occurred in Judaea, apparently involving unrest among the Jewish population. The diaspora uprisings were likely suppressed before autumn 117, just prior to Trajan's death; however, some unrest may have persisted into the winter of 117–118.

The Diaspora Revolt led to the devastation, and in some cases the annihilation, of Jewish communities in Egypt, Cyrenaica, and Cyprus. Significant damage to buildings, temples, and roads is well attested in Cyrene and other parts of Cyrenaica. A festival celebrating victory over the Jews was still being observed eighty years later in the Egyptian city of Oxyrhynchus. The war is also believed to have ended Alexandria's early Christian community, which was largely of Jewish origins; the later non-Jewish Christian community adopted traditions that had originated in the city's Jewish population. Thirteen years after the diaspora uprisings, perhaps seeking to eradicate the seat of Jewish unrest, Emperor Hadrian re-founded Jerusalem as a Roman colony; in response, the Jews of Judaea launched the catastrophic Bar Kokhba Revolt. In the aftermath of the Diaspora Revolt, the largest Jewish diaspora communities were concentrated in Mesopotamia, Asia Minor and Italy. Jewish communities reestablished themselves in Egypt, Cyprus, and Cyrenaica during the 3rd–4th centuries CE, though they never reached their former prominence.

== Primary sources ==
The available sources on the Diaspora Revolt are limited, fragmented, and incomplete, making it difficult for historians to reconstruct a comprehensive account of the events. The principal sources—Cassius Dio (writing a century later) and Eusebius (writing two centuries later)—offer only brief coverage, and only a few other, less detailed literary references survive. Scholars therefore rely on archaeological evidence, including ancient documents and inscriptions, to supplement and clarify the limited textual record.

Cassius Dio (c. 155 – c. 235), a Roman historian and senator, addressed the revolt in his Roman History (68.32.1–3); his narrative survives, however, only through a 12th-century abridgment by the Byzantine scholar Xiphilinus. Dio's account provides the most detail on the events in the city of Cyrene, Libya, while offering only brief mention of Cyprus and a passing reference to Egypt. This account attributes responsibility for the uprisings to the Jewish population. Dio also recorded the Roman suppression of unrest in Mesopotamia. Scholars disagree on the extent of changes and bias introduced by the abridgment: classicist Timothy Barnes suggested that Xiphilinus's anti-Jewish sentiment may have influenced and distorted the original text, whereas historian Lester L. Grabbe argued that "there is no reason to assume that it has been extensively distorted or rewritten, only shortened by omission."

Additional descriptions of the revolt come from Eusebius (c. 260–339), a bishop and scholar from late-antique Syria Palaestina, who discussed it in his Chronicon (68.32) and Ecclesiastical History (4.2.1–5). His account centers on the uprisings in Egypt, with additional references to a Jewish rebellion in Mesopotamia and events in Cyprus. Eusebius noted that Greek historians provided accounts of the revolt similar to his own, though he appears to have been unaware of Cassius Dio's version. Whereas Dio placed greater emphasis on extreme atrocities committed by Jewish rebels, Eusebius adopted a more neutral tone. Nevertheless, while his works provide an influential framework for the history of the first centuries CE, they also reflect an apologetic agenda (an effort to defend Christian beliefs and doctrines) that shaped his interpretation of the past. Accordingly, he framed the revolt within a broader theological argument that Jewish suffering was a consequence of their rejection of Jesus, a theme common in early Christian references to the Jewish–Roman wars.

Appian (c. 95 – c. 165), an Egyptian-born Greek historian and lawyer, wrote a first-person account of the revolt that can be found in the surviving portions of his Roman History 2.90. Among several anecdotes, he recounted his narrow escape from capture by Jewish rebels, fleeing a Jewish ship via wilderness paths and boat near Pelusium, and described the destruction of the Pompey monument near Alexandria by Jewish rebels. His tone is neutral, much like Eusebius, who may have relied on Appian as a source. Also active in the 2nd century, Arrian, a Greek author, wrote a now-lost work on the Parthians that reportedly included references to Trajan's actions against the Jews, and is believed to have been used as a source by Eusebius.

A much later source is Paulus Orosius (c. 375 – after 418), a Christian Roman historian and theologian, who discussed the events in his Seven Books Against the Pagans (7.12.6–8), composed around 418. He viewed the Jewish defeats in their uprisings against Rome as divine punishment for the persecution of early Christians by Jews. His narrative draws on Eusebius, likely via Latin translations by Jerome and Rufinus, though Orosius rearranged the material and adopts a more vivid, dramatic rhetorical style. Orosius's account's reliability has been questioned due to chronological and historical inaccuracies, and, according to Judaic scholar William Horbury, his version is derivative, lacking immediacy and "vague" in its presentation.

The uprisings in Egypt are also documented by contemporary papyrological evidence, especially texts in the Corpus Papyrorum Judaicarum (CPJ), a collection of papyri relating to Jews and Judaism in Egypt. These documents illuminate the revolt's chronology, casualties, impact, and aftermath, and show, for example, that local Egyptians fought against the Jews rather than supporting them, as was suggested earlier. Archaeological and epigraphic evidence also clarifies the events in Cyprus and Cyrenaica, with Latin and Greek inscriptions from Cyrenaica recording the reconstruction of buildings damaged during the "Jewish uprising", thereby revealing the scale of destruction and subsequent rebuilding programs.

The Diaspora Revolt also finds echoes in rabbinic literature composed in later centuries, based on earlier oral traditions. The Jerusalem Talmud, a 4th–5th-century Galilean commentary on the Mishnah, refers to the revolt in tractate Sukkah 5:1, which preserves three stories about it, including accounts of the destruction of the Great Synagogue of Alexandria and the massacre of Jews by Trajan. These narratives, which focus on Roman actions rather than the Greeks or Egyptians, were likely influenced by the heightened anti-Roman sentiment following the Bar Kokhba Revolt, which occurred about fifteen years later and had disastrous consequences for the Jews of Judaea. While the stories contain historical kernels, they also incorporate legendary elements that limit their reliability as historical sources. Nonetheless, they reflect contemporary rabbinic debates about Jewish life in the diaspora in the aftermath of the Jewish–Roman wars, highlight hostilities and tensions between Jews and Romans, and reveal continuing hope for the coming of the Messiah.

== Background ==
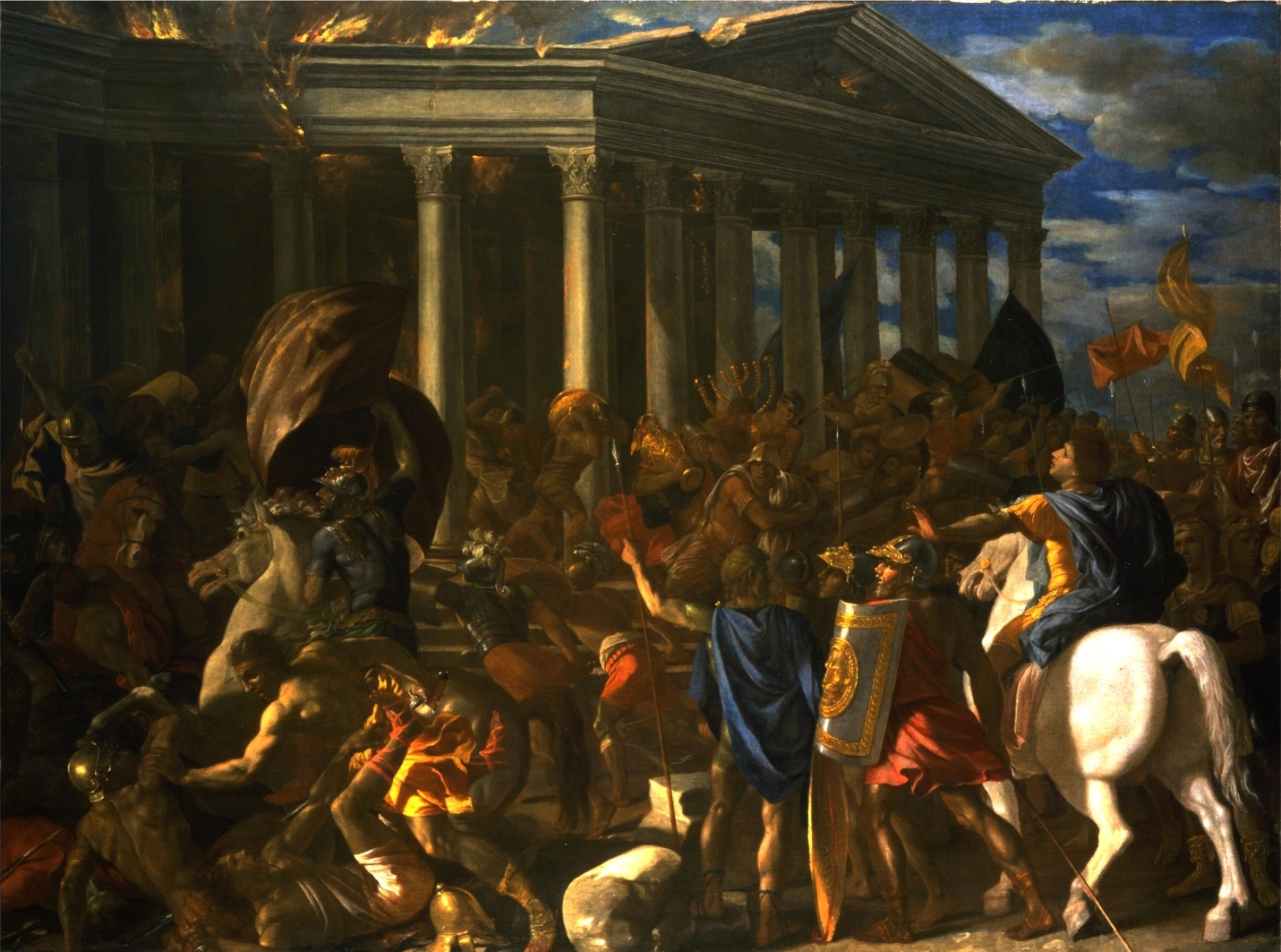
Painting of the destruction of the Jerusalem Temple in 70 CE (1626). This event contributed to the sense of unrest and messianic expectations that played a significant role in the Diaspora Revolt.

The motivations behind the diaspora uprisings are complex and difficult to discern, owing to the lack of direct sources on their underlying causes. The Roman destruction of the Second Temple in Jerusalem in 70 CE, at the height of the First Jewish Revolt, was a deeply traumatic event whose effect was exacerbated by the simultaneous introduction of the fiscus Judaicus, a humiliating, punitive tax imposed on all Jews across the empire. The post-revolt period also saw widespread messianic expectations—a belief in the imminent coming of a redeemer, a descendant of David, who would bring transformative change and restore the Davidic kingdom in Israel—as well as a longing for the re-establishment of the Jewish state. Contemporary Jewish texts, such as the Third Sibylline Oracle, 4 Ezra, and 2 Baruch, reflect these themes, emphasizing anticipation of a messianic figure, the ingathering of the exiles (the biblical promise that Jews dispersed in exile will be restored to their ancestral land) and the eventual rebuilding of the Temple. The messianic aspect of the revolt is perhaps suggested by Eusebius's reference to Lukuas—the leader of the Jewish rebels in Roman Libya—as "king", suggesting that the uprising evolved from an ethnic conflict into a nationalist movement with messianic ambitions for political independence.

Inter-ethnic tensions and local conditions also fueled the unrest, especially in Egypt, where longstanding social, economic, political, and ideological frictions between Jews and Greeks had intensified since the 3rd century BCE. The situation deteriorated under Roman rule, leading to sporadic violence in various eastern cities, including severe riots in Alexandria in 29 BCE, 38 CE, 41 CE, and 66 CE. The Jewish defeat in the First Jewish Revolt amplified hostility toward the Jews of Egypt, leading to their violent exclusion from civic positions and the imposition of higher business fees. It also intensified anti-Jewish rhetoric in Egypt, greatly exacerbating tensions between Jews and Egyptians. In the years leading up to the Diaspora Revolt, incidents of anti-Jewish violence by Greeks occurred in 112 and the summer of 115 CE. These attacks, especially the latter, were likely direct catalysts for the Jewish uprising in Egypt. In Cyrenaica, earlier disturbances in 73 CE, which resulted in the deaths and dispossession of many wealthy Jews, may have weakened the moderating influence of the Jewish elite, allowing more radical elements in Jewish society to gain prominence and push for revolt. Additionally, the destruction of the Jewish landholding aristocracy exacerbated economic hardships for Jewish tenant farmers, pushing them into cities and worsening their plight.

William Horbury wrote that the revolt was influenced by a strong national hope and local interpretations of messianic expectations, particularly the return of the exiles and the rebuilding of the Temple. He added that Jews in the diaspora may have been influenced by the ideals of "liberty" and "redemption", which were central to the First Jewish Revolt and spread to communities in Egypt, Cyrene, and possibly Cyprus through refugees and traders from Judaea in its aftermath. This idea is supported by Josephus's account of Jews belonging to the radical Sicarii faction who migrated to Cyrene after the war, the discovery of First Jewish Revolt coinage in Memphis, Egypt, and near Cyrene, as well as traces of these themes in diasporic literature.

Classicist E. Mary Smallwood suggested that the revolutionary movement during the Diaspora Revolt can be viewed as an early form of Zionism, seeking the return of Jewish exiles from North Africa to Palestine. She posits that the movement of Jewish rebels from Cyrenaica east into Egypt may have been intended as the first phase of a large-scale migration further east to Judaea. Archaeologist Shimon Applebaum wrote that the movement aimed at "the setting up of a new Jewish commonwealth, whose task was to inaugurate the messianic era." Christian biblical scholar and historian John M. G. Barclay likewise argued that the extensive damage to Cyrenaica's infrastructure during the uprising implies that the Jews involved intended to leave the province, probably aiming ultimately to reach Judaea. Horbury similarly concludes that the Jewish forces likely aimed to return to and defend Judaea.

== Uprisings ==
The Jewish uprisings erupted almost simultaneously across several eastern provinces of the Roman Empire. In Egypt, Cyrenaica, and Cyprus, Jewish actions were directed primarily against local populations rather than Roman authorities. By contrast, the rebellion in Mesopotamia appears to have been part of a broader resistance to Roman expansion into areas ruled by the Parthian Empire. There is no evidence that Jewish communities in Asia Minor participated in the revolt, and the Jewish community in Rome also did not join the uprising. Eusebius links the revolts in Cyrenaica and Egypt, while late Syriac sources mention Jews from Egypt fleeing to Judaea. However, there is no definitive evidence of coordinated action among the diaspora communities in revolt.

=== Cyrenaica ===
In Cyrenaica, Jewish rebels launched attacks against their Greek and Roman neighbors, led either by Andreas (according to Dio/Xiphilinus) or Lukuas (according to Eusebius). These could have been two separate individuals or a single person known by both names—a common practice at the time. Eusebius referred to Lukuas as "king", a title that has prompted some scholars to suggest a possible messianic motivation behind the uprising, though evidence supporting this theory remains limited. Eusebius wrote that the Jews of Cyrenaica collaborated with the Jews of Egypt, forming a symmachia (military alliance). He also mentioned that, at one point, the Jews of Cyrenaica moved into Egypt.

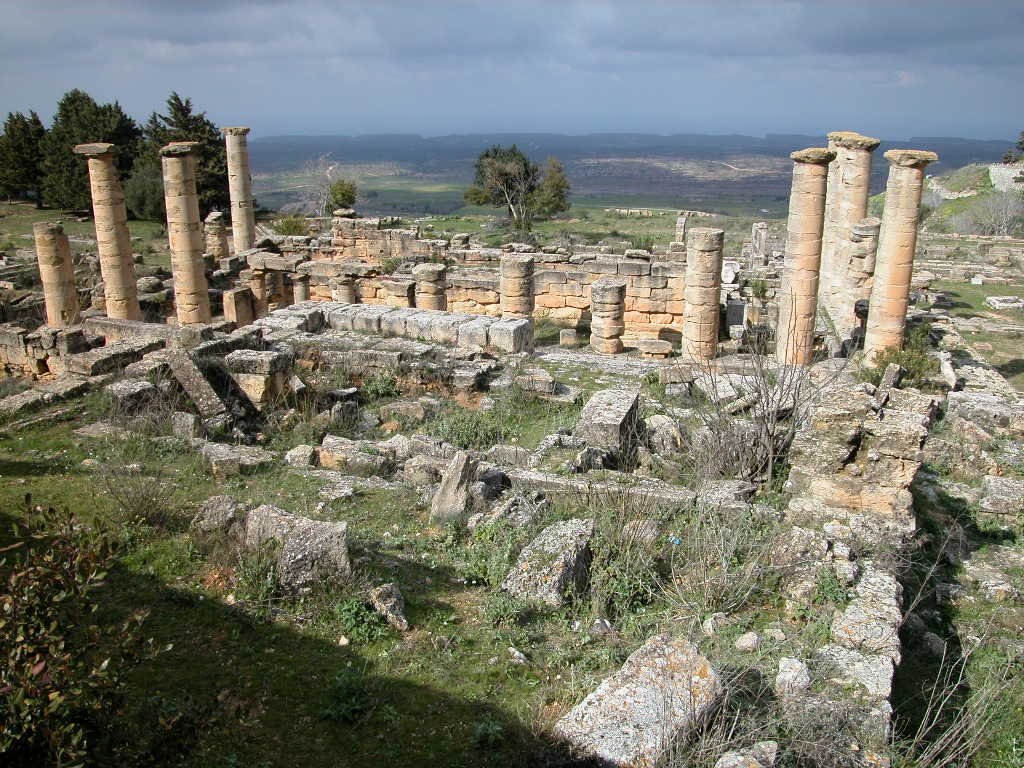
The ruins of Cyrene, Libya. The city's center was extensively damaged during the revolt, with public baths, the Caesareum, and several temples destroyed.

Dio's account described the Jews of Cyrenaica as engaging in shockingly violent and cruel behavior. He writes that the Jews engaged in cannibalism, mutilation, and other atrocities, including using the victims' skins and entrails for make clothing and belts and staging gladiatorial and wild beast shows. Dio wrote that the Jewish rebels in Cyrenaica were responsible for approximately 220,000 deaths, though this figure is likely exaggerated for rhetorical effect. Historian Miriam Pucci Ben Zeev argued that this portrayal should be viewed within the broader context of how "barbarian" revolts against Rome were typically described in contemporary historiography, adding that the atrocities Dio attributes to the Jews are no more egregious than those he ascribes to the Celtic Britons during the Boudican revolt in 61 CE or to the Bucoli, a group of Nile Delta herdsmen, during their uprising in Egypt in 171 CE.

Archaeological evidence points to extensive destruction in Cyrenaica attributed to Jewish rebels. Inscriptions record attacks on religious and civic structures, including temples and statues. At Cyrene, for instance, the sanctuary of Apollo and its surroundings saw the destruction and burning of the baths, porticoes, ball-courts, and other nearby buildings; the temple of Hecate was burned down during the uprising, and significant damage is also recorded at the Caesareum and the temple of Zeus. Classicist Joyce Reynolds noted significant damage to the sanctuary of Asclepius at Balagrae, west of Cyrene, which was rebuilt in the following decades. The destruction of a small 2nd-century temple near modern El Dab'a in Marmarica is likely also attributable to the Jewish rebels.

Damage is also attested along major roads, possibly resulting from deliberate rebel strategy. A Hadrianic milestone commemorates the repair of the road linking Cyrene with its port, Apollonia, which according to its inscription, "had been overturned and smashed up in the Jewish revolt," perhaps in anticipation of a Roman military advance from the sea. The presence of a deeply incised seven-branched menorah, a prominent Jewish symbol, on a road northwest of Balagrae may indicate, according to Reynolds, that Jews deliberately sought to disrupt the route connecting Cyrene with neighboring regions to the west.

=== Egypt ===
Most historians date the outbreak of the Jewish uprising in Egypt to approximately October 115 CE. This chronology is primarily based on papyrus CPJ II 435, which mentions a conflict between Jews and Greeks. Pucci Ben Zeev, however, contended that this document actually describes Greek attacks on Jews, rather than the beginning of a Jewish uprising, and prefers to date the revolt's start to 116. Evidence from ostraca found in the Jewish quarter of Edfu, in Upper Egypt, indicates that tax receipts for Jews paying the fiscus Judaicus cease by the end of May 116, suggesting this date as the earliest possible start for the revolt in that city. The latest possible date for the revolt's start is the beginning of September 116, as indicated by CPJ II 436, a concerned letter from the wife of the strategos (military leader) Apollonios in Hermoupolis, a major city between Lower and Upper Egypt.

According to Eusebius, unrest in Egypt arose when Jewish communities, seized by a spirit of discord (stasis), engaged in civil conflict with their Greek neighbors. This unrest was soon followed by the advance of Jewish forces from Cyrene, led by Lukuas, who then achieved an initial victory over the Greeks. The Greeks escaped to Alexandria, massacring its Jewish population. Lukuas's forces, supported by Egyptian Jews who rallied to his side, continued to plunder the Egyptian countryside (chora) and destroy various districts throughout the country. Papyrological evidence indicates that the revolt indeed affected extensive areas, including the Athribite district, the region around Memphis (noted for its long-standing antisemitism), the Faiyum, Oxyrhynchus, and the Herakleopolite district. Further south, fighting also impacted the Kynopolite, Hermopolite, Lycopolite, and Apollinopolite districts. Papyrological evidence indicates that the Jewish forces were well-organized and capable of presenting serious military challenges to their adversaries; as they moved through Egyptian villages, they quickly overcame local resistance.

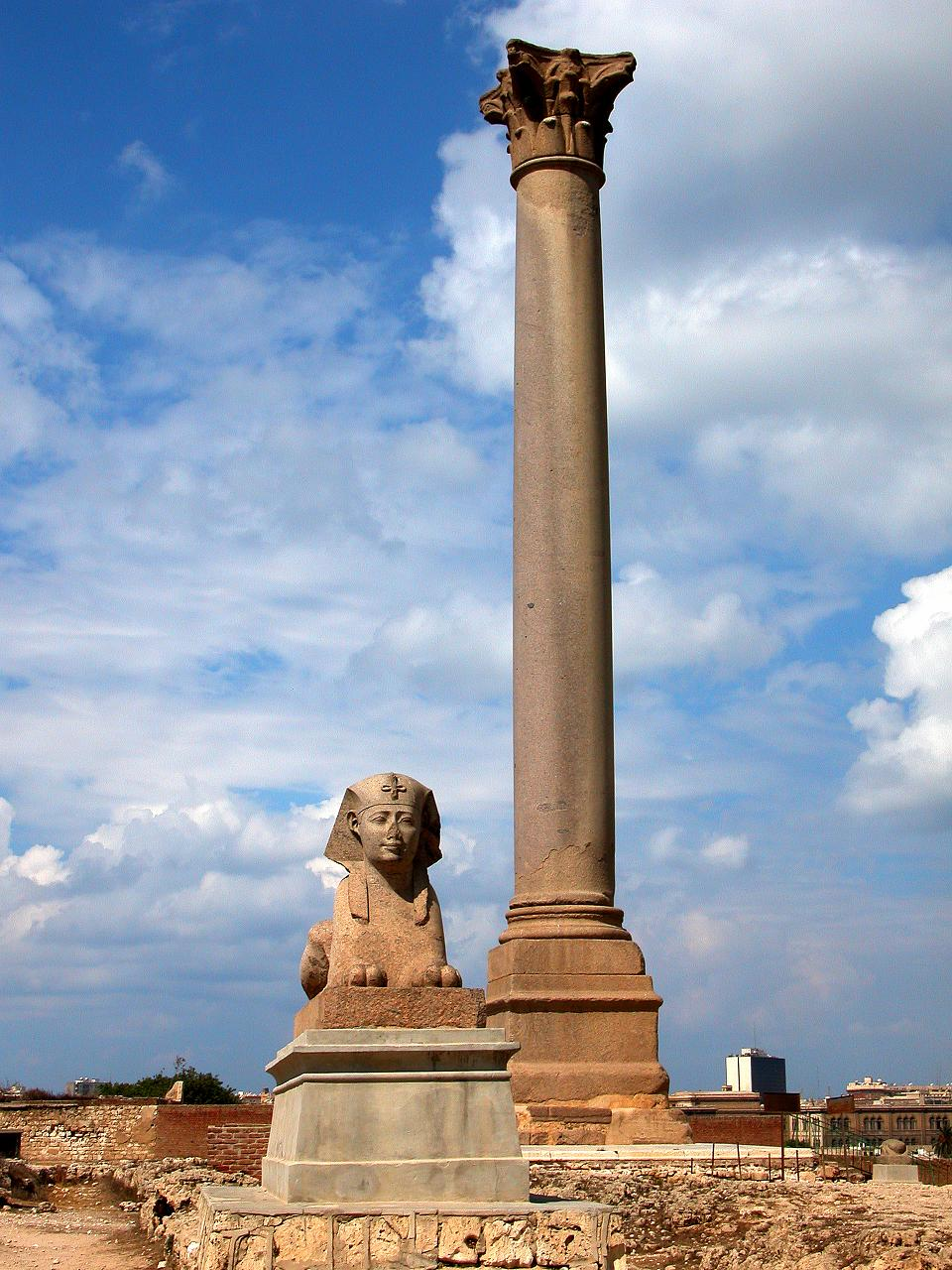
Pompey's Pillar in Alexandria, erected in the late 3rd century CE, standing on the site of the former Serapeum, which was damaged during the war

Appian wrote that the Jews destroyed the shrine of Nemesis, the Greek goddess of retribution, near Alexandria. He added that this was done "for the needs of the war", suggesting an effort to remove a strategic point of advantage for the enemy, possibly by reusing the stone to strengthen Jewish defenses. Since the shrine housed the buried head of Pompey, its destruction may also have been motivated by a desire to avenge his desecration of the Temple during his conquest of Jerusalem in 63 BCE. This attack, together with other assaults on pagan temples in Egypt and Cyrenaica, may help explain the description of "impious Jews" found in some papyri.

Appian noted that the Jews seized control of waterways near Pelusium, located at the eastern edge of the Nile Delta, a region of critical strategic value. Further evidence of military activity in Egypt's waterways is found in another papyrus, CPJ II 441, and in a 7th-century chronicle by Coptic bishop John of Nikiû. The latter mentions the Babylon Fortress, a fort situated at the entrance of Amnis Traianus, a canal constructed under Trajan which facilitated connections between the Nile and the Red Sea.

Papyri indicate that the Greeks, led by strategoi, retaliated against the Jews, with assistance from Egyptian peasants and Romans. Prefect Rutilius Lupus is noted to have personally participated in these engagements. Some efforts were successful, as evidenced by the recorded "victory and success" of Apollonios near Memphis; however, due to many Roman forces being deployed in Mesopotamia, the remaining troops, including the Legio XXII Deiotariana and part of the Legio III Cyrenaica, were insufficient to restore order effectively.

=== Cyprus ===
Most of what is known about the events in Cyprus comes from literary sources, since the epigraphic evidence is limited, indirect, and difficult to interpret. Dio reported that the local Jewish rebels were led by an individual named Artemion. Eusebius's Chronicon states that the Jews attacked the island's pagan inhabitants and destroyed the major port city of Salamis. Both pagan and Christian sources describe the revolt as having heavy casualties, with Dio claiming that "two hundred and forty thousand perished" in Cyprus and Orosius asserting that "all the Greek inhabitants of Salamis were killed."

== Suppression ==
According to Eusebius, Trajan sent Quintus Marcius Turbo, one of his leading generals, "with land and sea forces including cavalry. He waged war vigorously against them in many battles for a considerable time and killed many thousands of Jews, not only those of Cyrene but also those of Egypt." According to Judaic scholar Allen Kerkeslager, Trajan diverted Marcius Turbo from the Parthian front because the Jewish uprisings threatened the stability of the Roman Empire by disrupting grain shipments from Egypt, which served as a major source of grain for Rome and other provinces.

Turbo arrived in Egypt in late 116 or early 117. He was likely accompanied by the cohors ('tactical unit'; lit. 'cohort') I Ulpia Afrorum equitata ('First Ulpian Cohort of Africans, part-mounted') and the cohors I Augusta praetoria Lusitanorum equitata ('First Augustan Praetorian Cohort of Lusitanians, part-mounted'), both present in Egypt in 117 CE, with the latter suffering heavy losses during the early summer of the same year. One papyrus details plans to mobilize large forces, including fleets from the Italian ports of Misenum and Ravenna, the Legio III Cyrenaica, and auxiliary units such as the cohors I Flavia Cilicum equitata ('First Flavian Cohort of Cilicians, part-mounted'). Legio XXII Deiotariana and Legio III Cyrenaica fought against the Jews, with the names of specific Roman legionaries from these units recorded as being killed in combat. Native Egyptians and Greeks, driven by entrenched anti-Jewish sentiments intensified by wartime conditions and imperial support, eagerly joined the Romans in attacking Jews. The early severe losses suffered by the Roman military had resulted in the conscription of locals into the army, and the presence of seasoned Roman troops, eager for retribution, further exacerbated the violence.

Turbo's mission seemingly included not only quelling the revolt but also exterminating Jews in the affected areas. Roman repression was severe. Appian described it as an extermination of the Jewish population in Egypt, while Arian wrote that Trajan asked "to destroy the nation entirely, but if not, at least to crush it and stop its presumptuous wickedness." Turbo's military actions may have extended to Cyrenaica, where a Roman praefectus castrorum was killed. In Cyprus, the suppression of the Jewish revolt was led by Gaius Valerius Rufus, one of Trajan's generals. The military actions there may also corroborate the account of Rabbi Shimon bar Yochai recorded in Sukkah 5:1:6 of the Jerusalem Talmud, according to which the blood of Jews killed in Egypt reached as far as Cyprus:

A son was born to him on the Ninth of Ave and they did fast. His daughter died on Ḥanukkah and they lit lights. His wife sent and told him, "instead that you conquer the barbarians come and conquer the Jews who revolted against you." He intended to come in ten days and came and found them occupied [in the Torah with the verse from Deuteronomy 28:49:] "He will carry against you a people from far away, from the ends of the earth, etc". He asked them, "with what were you occupied". They answered him, "with such-and-such". He said to them, "this man is he since he intended to come in ten days but came in five". He surrounded them by legions and killed them. He said to their wives, "if you listen to my legions I shall not kill you". They told him, "what you did to those on the ground floor do to those on the gallery". He mixed their blood with their blood and the blood flowed in the sea up to Cyprus. At that moment the horn of Israel was trimmed and will not be restituted until the Son of David will come.

Scholarly debate surrounds the precise end date of the Jewish uprising. Pucci Ben Zeev argued that the revolt was likely suppressed before autumn 117, and possibly by summer, prior to Trajan's death. The reassignment of Marcius Turbo to Mauretania following Hadrian's accession as emperor in August 117 appears to support this timeline. However, historians Noah Hacham and Tal Ilan point to evidence suggesting more prolonged unrest. In CPJ 664c (a letter dated to 20 December 117), a woman named Eudaimonis urged her son Apollonios, the strategos of Heptakomia in Upper Egypt, to remain in his secure residence—a warning that hints at persistent danger. This correspondence, along with a subsequent letter concerning the same family, indicates that instability continued in some areas into the winter of 117–118 CE.

== Related events ==
=== Events in Mesopotamia ===
Literary sources describing Roman violence against Jews in Mesopotamia, conquered by Trajan around 115 CE, are scarce. As a result, scholars debate whether a distinct Jewish revolt occurred there, as in other provinces, or whether Jewish activity in Mesopotamia formed part of a broader resistance to Roman rule in the recently conquered Parthian territories. Pucci Ben Zeev argued for the latter, suggesting that Jews joined the broader regional insurgency in order to preserve the relatively favorable status they had enjoyed under Parthian rule, in contrast to the harsher conditions they expected under Roman rule.

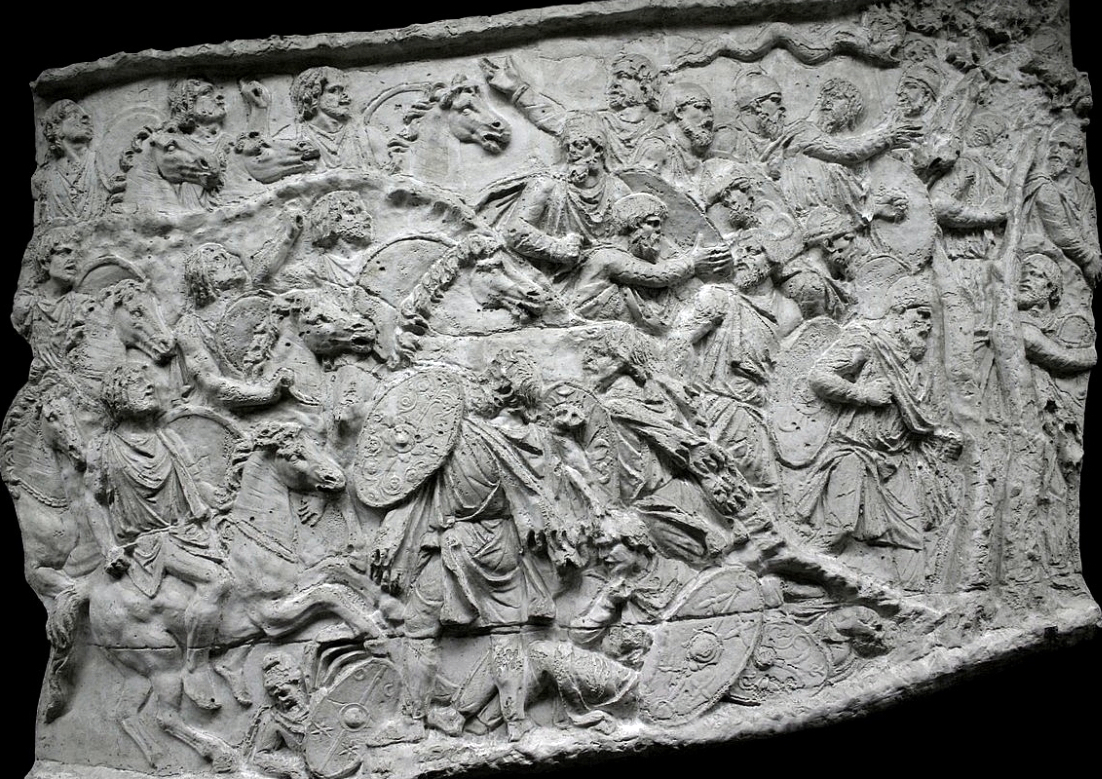
Cast of a relief from Trajan's Column, on display at the Museum of Roman Civilization in Rome, showing Lusius Quietus leading cavalry in battle

Eusebius reported that Trajan suspected the Jews in Mesopotamia "would also attack the inhabitants", prompting him to send General Lusius Quietus to suppress them harshly. Eusebius further noted that Quietus "murdered a great number of the Jews there." Later Christian sources also describe a military campaign led by Quietus against the Jews. In contrast, Cassius Dio's account does not mention a Jewish uprising or a campaign against Jews in Mesopotamia. Instead, Dio described a generalized regional rebellion during the summer of 116 CE. In this version, Trajan dispatched several generals—including Quietus—to quell these revolts, which resulted in the recovery of Nisibis and the destruction of Edessa, both in northern Mesopotamia. Dio did not link Jews to these Mesopotamian events; while he did note that Quietus took part in suppressing Jewish rebels, he placed that action within the context of the uprisings in Egypt, Cyprus, and Cyrenaica, leaving the exact location of Quietus's involvement unspecified.

=== The "Kitos War" in Judaea ===
The question of whether the Diaspora Revolt also spread to the province of Judaea remains debated in modern scholarship. Some researchers use the term "Kitos War" (Note: Also known as the "War of Kitos/Qitos/Quietus", after Lusius Quietus) to refer to this possible unrest in Judaea. This interpretation is based on the Seder Olam Rabbah 30 and tractate Sotah 9:14 of the Mishnah, (Note: The Babylonian Talmud names Titus, not Quietus, whereas Quietus is mentioned in Sotah 9:15:1 of the Jerusalem Talmud.) which date a "war of Quietus" to fifty-two years after the destruction of the Second Temple and sixteen years before the Bar Kokhba Revolt—placing it roughly in the period of the Diaspora Revolt. These sources also mention new Jewish bans, enacted after the war, prohibiting brides from wearing crowns at their weddings and fathers from teaching their sons Greek. However, rabbinic texts do not explicitly associate this "war of Quietus" with Judaea and may instead refer to Quietus's suppression of Jewish uprisings in Mesopotamia rather than to disturbances in Judaea itself. (Note: Archaeologist Hanan Eshel, for example, differentiates between the "Trajanic Revolt", a term he uses to refer to the Jewish uprisings in Egypt, Libya, and Cyprus, and "the War of Quietus", which he describes as "Trajan's war against the Jews of Mesopotamia".)

In non-Jewish sources, there are several indications that some military activity did occur in or around Judaea during this period. Following the campaign in Mesopotamia, Lusius Quietus was appointed governor of Judaea; he likely arrived with supplemental forces, possibly including a vexillatio (temporary detachment) of Legio III Cyrenaica. An inscription from Sardinia lists an expeditio Judaeae among Trajan's military campaigns, while medieval Syriac sources maintain that the leader of the revolt in Cyrenaica was eventually defeated within Judaea by Roman forces. It is possible that tensions were exacerbated by Roman cult activity: Hippolytus reported (in a fragment preserved in Syriac) that "Traianus Quintos", possibly Quietus, set up a statue of kore (Persephone) in Jerusalem, while an inscription records soldiers of Legio III Cyrenaica dedicating an altar or statue to Serapis in the city during Trajan's final year. Nevertheless, the lateness of the Syriac sources, and the fact that the main primary accounts of the revolt, Cassius Dio and Eusebius, both do not mention hostilities in Judaea, make these indications uncertain.

Some scholars have also linked the Talmudic legends of Lulianos and Paphos, two wealthy Jewish brothers, from "the pride of Israel", who are said to have been executed in Laodicea (or, in some versions, Lydda), and taken them as evidence of hostilities in Judaea. However, these stories, which appear in several passages in rabbinic literature, are vague and often mutually contradictory. They also pose historical difficulties, as they portray Trajan not as an emperor, but rather as a Roman governor in Judaea who is himself executed. In Ecclesiastes Rabbah (III, 17), Lulianos and Paphos are condemned to death by Trajan for an unknown offence but are saved at the last moment when two officials arrive from Rome and put Trajan to death. In the Babylonian Talmud (Ta'anit 18b), Trajan executes the brothers shortly before being executed himself. The Jerusalem Talmud (Ta'anit 2:12) connects their execution with the abolition of a festival called "the day of Tirion/Turianus" ("Trajan's Day"), mentioned in several rabbinic passages as a minor feast celebrated on 12 Adar (February/March), whereas the parallel passage in the Babylonian Talmud (Ta'anit 18b) instead connects the abolition with two other figures executed on that day.

Smallwood argued that there may be a historical core behind these legends, suggesting that Lulianos and Paphos were leaders of a local Jewish rising in Judaea that was suppressed by Quietus. In her view, the "Trajan" who appears in the story is possibly a distorted echo of Quietus, who is known to have been killed, perhaps on Hadrian's orders, not long after his governorship in Judaea. Historian Aharon Oppenheimer, drawing on Genesis Rabbah, noted that their activity is associated with both Galilee and Syria and takes this as an indication of Jewish unrest in Galilee during the Diaspora Revolt. Historian Moshe David Herr, however, contests this reconstruction, arguing that the rabbinic passages adduced by Oppenheimer cannot be securely dated to the time of the Diaspora Revolt and therefore do not provide firm evidence for a Kitos War in Judaea. Another historian, David Rokeah, likewise rejects the link between the two brothers and unrest in Galilee, noting that the Sifra (Bechukotai 5:2), a rabbinic exegesis on Leviticus, described them as being from Alexandria—something he takes to suggest that they were refugees from Egypt, possibly after taking part in the uprising there.

Some scholars dispute that any conflict occurred in Judaea during the Diaspora Revolt. Historians Eric M. Meyers and Mark A. Chancey, for example, wrote that "the rebellion did not apparently spread to Judaea, where the arrival of a second legion to complement the Tenth Legion provided a successful buffer against further uprisings." Similarly, Fergus Millar noted that "there is no concrete evidence for a Jewish revolt in Judaea" concurrent with the Diaspora Revolt. According to Lester L. Grabbe, "the evidence for such [hostilities in Judaea] seems extremely skimpy and is indirect at best. It is possible that there were attempts at an uprising there, but, if so, they seem to have been quickly put down by the governor Quietus."

== Aftermath ==
=== Destruction of Jewish communities ===
The suppression of the revolt saw a devastating campaign of ethnic cleansing, which effectively led to the near-total expulsion and annihilation of Jews from Cyrenaica, Cyprus, and many parts of Egypt. Historical evidence indicates that Jewish communities were either annihilated or forced into migration, with only a few survivors possibly remaining in isolated areas on the fringes of Roman control.

In Egypt, the Jewish community suffered near-total destruction during the revolt, an event historian Willy Clarysse characterized as a genocide. Appian reported that Trajan "was exterminating the Jewish race in Egypt", a claim corroborated by papyri and inscriptions documenting widespread devastation of Jewish populations across many regions. Jewish lands were confiscated, and Trajan implemented a new registry, the Ioudaikos logos, to catalog properties that had previously belonged to Jews. The Jewish community in Alexandria appears to have been entirely eradicated, with the only survivors likely being those who had fled to other regions at the onset of the uprising. The Jerusalem Talmud, in tractate Sukkah, recorded the destruction of the celebrated Great Synagogue of Alexandria. Furthermore, the Tosefta (tractates Pe'ah 4:6 and Ketubot 3:1), a collection of rabbinic law and teachings compiled in the late 2nd or early 3rd century CE, contains passages mentioning a former Jewish court in Alexandria that appears to have been abolished during this same period. William Horbury suggested that some Jewish refugees fled to Judaea, bringing with them stories about Egypt and Trajan, which were later preserved via rabbinic transmission. Others may have fled to Syria, where it is possible that works like 4 Maccabees were created by Alexandrian Jews who had resettled in the province's capital, Antioch.

After 117 CE, Jewish presence in Egypt and Cyrenaica virtually disappears from historical sources. No Jewish inscriptions from Egypt have been securely dated from the period following the revolt until the 4th century, and Egyptian papyri that mention Jews predominantly refer to isolated individuals rather than communities. In the Faiyum region, which previously had substantial Jewish communities, mid-2nd century tax records show only one Jew among a thousand adult males. Moreover, no Jewish tax receipts have been discovered in Edfu from after 116. It was not until the 3rd century that Jews re-established communities in Egypt, and they never regained their former influence.

In Cyrenaica, a gap in the evidence following the revolt suggests that the region was virtually depopulated of Jews due to their migration to Egypt and subsequent massacres by non-Jews. After the war ended, laws were placed ordering the exile of Jews from Cyrene, which historian Renzo De Felice said: "reduced the flourishing [Jewish] community of Cyrene to insignificance and set it on the road to an inevitable decline." According to De Felice, many of the Jews expelled joined Berber tribes, particularly those around modern-day Sirte. A substantial Jewish community was not reestablished in Cyrenaica until the 4th century.

Cassius Dio reported that, even in his day in 3rd-century Cyprus, "no Jew may set foot on that island, and even if one of them is driven upon the shores by a storm he is put to death." This claim is corroborated by archaeological evidence, which indicates no Jewish presence on the island until the 4th century.

=== Impact on the eastern provinces ===
After his accession in 117 CE, Trajan's successor, Hadrian, was confronted with the devastation left by the Diaspora Revolt, particularly in Cyrenaica. There was significant damage to buildings, temples, and roads, especially in Cyrene, where the city center was extensively destroyed. The scale of the destruction was such that Hadrian was compelled to rebuild the city at the beginning of his reign, as attested by archaeological evidence. Hadrianic inscriptions document the restoration of sites such as the baths by the Sanctuary of Apollo and the Caesareum. A letter from Hadrian to the citizens of Cyrene in 134/135 CE urged them to prevent their city from remaining in ruins.

Following the devastation caused by the revolt, the Roman authorities initiated a large-scale recolonization of Cyrenaica, sending 3,000 veterans under the command of the prefect of Legio XV Apollinaris to settle in the region. Some of these veterans were stationed in Cyrene itself, while others were relocated to other sites, including the newly founded city of Hadrianopolis on the Mediterranean coast. Eusebius's Chronicon and Orosius also report extensive destruction in Salamis and Alexandria, with Orosius noting that Libya would have remained depopulated without Hadrian's resettlement efforts.

The Jews [...] waged war on the inhabitants throughout Libya in the most savage fashion, and to such an extent was the country wasted that, its cultivators having been slain, its land would have remained utterly depopulated, had not Emperor Hadrian gathered settlers from other places and sent them thither, for the inhabitants had been wiped out.

— Orosius, Seven Books of History Against the Pagans, 7.12.6

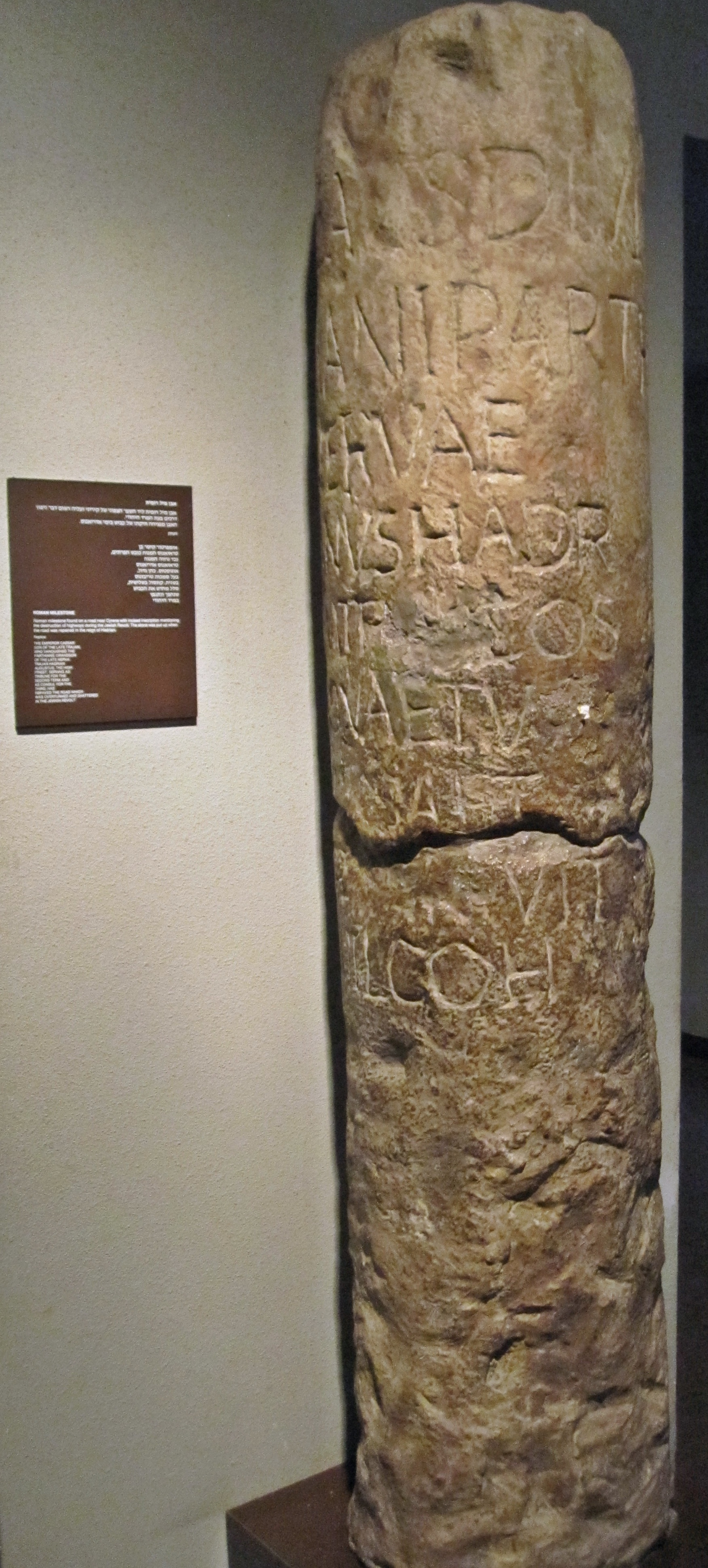
Replica of a Roman milestone found at Shahhat, near Cyrene, on display at Anu – Museum of the Jewish People. It bears an inscription documenting the repair of a road damaged during the Jewish uprising, carried out under Hadrian.

In Egypt, the aftermath of the revolts caused agricultural decline, shortages of slave labor and textiles, and an economic crisis with unstable prices and a shortage of essentials like bread. Roman troops in Egypt suffered significant losses, with some units experiencing casualties of 30–40 percent. Egypt's agricultural hinterlands were heavily impacted by the war, and many farmlands remained unrecovered and underproductive for decades. Despite this, census data do not show a major demographic disruption in the overall population.

In Alexandria, the damage was less extensive than was claimed by Eusebius, according to whom the city was "overthrown" and required rebuilding by Hadrian. The primary loss was the sanctuary of Nemesis. The Serapeum and other structures were likely damaged later by Egyptian and Cyrenaican Jews, rather than by Alexandrian Jews.

The total destruction of the Cypriot city of Salamis has also been questioned, since it received the title of metropolis in 123, only a few years after the Jewish uprising, suggesting that not all damage was as severe as reported. Some Roman actions, such as Trajan's colony in Libya and Hadrian's edict improving conditions for the Egyptian peasantry, may likewise not be directly linked to the uprisings but instead reflect pre-existing circumstances.

=== Impact on Trajan's Parthian campaign ===
The simultaneous Jewish uprisings across various Roman regions forced Trajan to divert his top military leaders from the Parthian front, curtailing his campaign. While the resistance in Mesopotamia was largely suppressed, it nonetheless led to a compromise with the Parthians. Trajan's siege of Hatra continued throughout the summer of 117 but ultimately failed; the years of constant campaigning and reports of revolts took a toll on the emperor, who suffered a stroke resulting in partial paralysis. He decided to begin the long journey back to Rome to recover, but as he sailed from Seleucia, his health deteriorated rapidly. He was taken ashore at Selinus in Cilicia, where he died. His successor, Hadrian, soon assumed power, reversing Trajan's expansionist policy and relinquishing his conquests east of the Euphrates River, which reverted to being Rome's eastern boundary.

Trajan's Parthian campaign did not secure Roman dominion in Babylonia; despite a triumph at his funeral, the campaign failed, and the Babylonian Jews stayed beyond Roman control. The Babylonian Talmud, in tractate Pesachim 87b, preserves Rabbi Hiyya's explanation for this circumstance and for Babylonian Jews' immunity to Roman decrees: "The Holy One, blessed be He, knows that Israel is unable to endure the cruel decrees of Edom; therefore He exiled them to Babylonia."

=== Impact on Judaea ===
In the aftermath of the Diaspora Revolt, Roman authorities tightened their control over Judaea, increasing the military presence and reorganizing the province's administration. With Hadrian's accession to the throne in 117 CE, Quietus was dismissed from his role in Judaea and replaced by Marcus Titius Lustricus Bruttianus. Around the same time, a second legion, Legio II Traiana Fortis, was stationed in the province. This raised the permanent garrison to two legions and elevated Judaea from a praetorian prefect to consular province. By around 120, milestones attest to the construction of a new Roman road securing the key corridor linking Judaea, Galilee, Egypt, and Syria; Caparcotna in Galilee was also integrated into this network and developed into a Roman base of operations. The Romans further consolidated their grip on Judaea by settling loyal populations, including discharged legionaries, in the province. According to historian Martin Goodman, this growing military build‑up indicates Roman anxiety about the possibility of another uprising in Judaea, despite the reluctance of local Jews to join the recent revolts in the diaspora.

Around 130, Hadrian visited Judaea and decided to rebuild Jerusalem as a Roman colony dedicated to Jupiter, naming it Aelia Capitolina. This decision, together with a possible imperial ban on brit milah (Hebrew: בְּרִית מִילָה, lit. 'covenant [of] circumcision'), a ritual essential to Jewish practice, was among the immediate triggers of the Bar Kokhba Revolt, the final major Jewish uprising against Roman rule and the last serious attempt to restore Jewish independence in the Land of Israel until the modern era. According to Goodman, Hadrian—an activist emperor who preferred to impose reforms rather than merely react to crises—was acutely aware of the disastrous consequences of the Diaspora Revolt, as indicated by his post-revolt construction projects in Cyrenaica. Goodman argues that Hadrian's decision to refound Jerusalem as Aelia Capitolina was intended as a "final solution for Jewish rebelliousness": by permanently transforming the Jewish holy city into a Roman colonia modeled on the imperial capital, Hadrian aimed to prevent future Jewish uprisings. Archaeologist Hanan Eshel also points to a rise in Jewish nationalistic sentiment, possibly fueled by the Diaspora Revolt, as one of the motivations behind the revolt.

Following a brief period of Jewish independence, a large-scale Roman military campaign devastated Judaea and was followed by severe punitive measures. The Jewish population of Judaea was drastically reduced, and the province was renamed Syria Palaestina. In the aftermath, Galilee emerged as the province's major Jewish center, while the largest diaspora communities were concentrated in central Mesopotamia under Parthian and later Sasanian rule. Other significant Jewish populations remained in Asia Minor and Italy, both within the Roman Empire.

=== Influence on Jewish thought ===
In tractate Vayehi Beshalach of the Mekhilta de-Rabbi Ishmael, a rabbinic exegesis on the Book of Exodus generally dated to the 3rd century CE but incorporating earlier tannaitic material (1st–2nd centuries CE), the "days of Trajan" are identified as the third instance in which the Torah's injunction against returning to Egypt was violated, resulting in three punishments:

In three places God warned Israel not to return to Egypt [...] Yet three times they returned, and three times they fell. The first was in the days of Sennacherib, as it is said, Woe to them that go down to Egypt for help. The second was in the days of Yohanan son of Kareah, as it is said, 'Then it shall come to pass that the word, which you fear, shall overtake you there in the land of Egypt. The third time was in the days of Trajan. On these three occasions they returned, and on all three occasions they fell.

— Mekhilta of Rabbi Ishmael, Tractate Vayehi Beshalach (ed. Lauterbach, vol. 1, 213–4), 3:25–27

The reference to the calamity during Trajan's reign is more concise than the detailed accounts of the earlier violations, suggesting that the event was still vivid in the Jewish consciousness. According to this interpretation, the destruction of the community in Alexandria was a consequence of violating the prohibition against returning to Egypt, implying that every Jewish settlement in Egypt was a sin. While the Mekhilta does not identify the sage behind this saying, a parallel tradition in the Jerusalem Talmud (Sukkah 5:1:5) attributes it to Shimon bar Yochai, a sage of the generation following the Bar Kokhba Revolt who, in numerous other sayings, emphasized the centrality of the Land of Israel. According to Noah Hacham, Bar Yochai's statement served a dual purpose: it aimed to explain to his contemporaries the destruction of the Jewish community in Egypt, while also reinforcing the notion that, despite the disastrous consequences of the Bar Kokhba Revolt and subsequent distress, only the Land of Israel offered the hope of safety and salvation for the Jewish people.

The Jerusalem Talmud (Sukkah 5:1:5), following Bar Yochai's statement and preceding a description of the Great Synagogue of Alexandria and its destruction by Trajan, includes an amoraic passage (composed between roughly 200 and 500 CE in a blend of Hebrew and Aramaic) that offers an explanation for Trajan's massacre of the Jews in Alexandria. The legend presents a stark contrast between Jewish and Roman behavior: when the emperor was celebrating the birth of his son, the Jews were observing their traditional mourning on the Ninth of Av; when the emperor's daughter died, the Jews were celebrating Hanukkah with festive lights. Interpreting these actions as signs of rebellion, Trajan's wife persuades him to redirect his military focus from a campaign against the "Barbarians" toward the suppression of the Jews. When the emperor arrives, he finds the Jews engaged with a prophetic verse from the Torah that alludes to an enemy nation. A later portion of the passage mentions the eagle—a Roman symbol—which identifies the prophesied biblical oppressor with Rome. The emperor then "surrounded them with legions and killed them. He said to their wives, if you listen to my legions, I shall not kill you. They told him, what you did to those on the ground floor do to those on the gallery. He mixed their blood with their blood, and the blood flowed into the sea as far as Cyprus. At that moment the horn of Israel was trimmed and will not be restored until the Son of David comes." Although the account contains clear fictionalizations—Trajan is not known to have had children, and there is no evidence of his presence in Egypt at the time—it nevertheless incorporates historical elements, including Trajan's diversion of troops from his Parthian campaign and the destruction of Jewish communities.

Noah Hacham interpreted the stories as reflecting a fundamental and irreconcilable conflict between Jews and Romans. The Ninth of Av, when Jews commemorate Rome's destruction of the Second Temple, coincides with Rome celebrating the continuity of its empire, while Hanukkah, marking the Temple's rededication, contrasts with the disruption of Roman continuity. Additionally, the Egyptian context casts Trajan as harsher than the biblical Pharaoh: the latter targeted male infants, whereas Trajan annihilated all. According to Hacham, these stories, put together in the Jerusalem Talmud, frame the destruction of Alexandria's Jewish community as part of a pattern of calamities endured by the Jewish people.

The Babylonian Talmud, in tractate Sanhedrin 111a, records another late-2nd-century rabbinic perspective on the aftermath of the uprising as a baraita (בָּרַיתָא, bārayṯā, 'outside [teaching]') attributed to Rabbi Eliezer ben Jose:

It is taught in a baraita that Rabbi [Eliezer], son of Rabbi [Jose], says: "One time I entered Alexandria of Egypt. I found one old man, and he said to me: 'Come, and I will show you what my ancestors, the Egyptians, did to your ancestors, the Jewish people. Some of them they drowned in the sea, some of them they killed with the sword, and some of them they crushed in the buildings.' And it is over this matter, Moses['s] protest of the afflictions suffered by the Jewish people, that Moses, our teacher, was punished, as it is stated: 'For since I came to Pharaoh to speak in Your (i.e., God's) Name, he has done evil to this people, neither have You delivered Your people at all'" (Exodus 5:23).

In the narrative, Rabbi Eliezer travels to Alexandria and an elderly local shows him the bones of Jews buried beneath a building, boasting that some were drowned, some slain by the sword, and some crushed beneath structures under construction. The narrator reads this scene back into the Exodus tradition—linking the discovered atrocities to Moses's lament over Israel's suffering—but the story's setting and imagery also resonate with later historical memory. Horbury has argued that the Alexandria attribution and the motif of construction over Jewish corpses fit Jewish recollections of the Diaspora Revolt; he suggests the tale reflects what late-2nd-century Judaeans would have found plausible rather than reporting an eyewitness account.

=== Impact on early Christianity in Egypt ===
The impact of the revolt on the development of Christianity in Egypt, and particularly the fate and influence of the pre-revolt Jewish Christian community, has been the subject of scholarly debate. Although Christian traditions place the arrival of Christianity in Egypt in the 1st century, evidence for a Christian presence in Alexandria before the late 2nd century remains sparse. It is nevertheless plausible that, before the Diaspora Revolt, a small and largely inconspicuous early Christian community existed in Alexandria, predominantly of Jewish origin and embedded within the wider Jewish community.

Historian Joseph Mélèze-Modrzejewski argued that because early Christianity in Egypt was closely bound to Alexandrian Jewry, it was effectively devastated together with that community during the Diaspora Revolt. In this view, Jewish Christianity disappeared in the catastrophe, and Christianity in Egypt was later reconstituted as a non-Jewish movement (so-called "pagan Christianity"), with any surviving Christian Jews being absorbed into the new community. From this perspective, the institutional church attested from the Severan period onward represents a post-revolt development rather than a direct continuation of the earlier Jewish Christian environment.

An alternative interpretation, advanced by the scholar of religion Birger A. Pearson, holds that although the revolt was probably a significant event for Christians in Egypt, it did not result in a complete rupture. Rather, the evidence points to substantial continuities. Pearson noted that Christians preserved and transmitted much of the literary legacy of Alexandrian Jewry, most notably the Septuagint (the Greek translation of the Hebrew Bible) as well as the works of Philo of Alexandria, a Jewish philosopher. Theological traditions rooted in the Jewish community of Alexandria, such as Logos theology and negative theology, were likewise adopted by Christians, leaving their intellectual foundations deeply shaped by Jewish thought. Pearson also points to social and institutional continuities, including the existence of ascetic Christian communities possibly influenced by the Jewish Therapeutae and the organization of each Christian congregation under a presbyter, in a structure modelled on the synagogue. As Christianity later expanded into the countryside, it developed beyond its Jewish and Hellenistic roots under the influence of native Egyptian culture and language, leading to the emergence of Coptic Christianity.

=== Commemoration in Egypt ===
At Oxyrhynchus, a festival commemorating the victory over the Jews was still observed nearly 80 years later, around 200 CE, during the visit of Emperor Septimius Severus to Egypt, as documented in papyrus CPJ II 450:

The inhabitants of Oxyrhynchus possess the goodwill, faithfulness and friendship to the Romans, which they showed in the war against the Jews, fighting on your side. And even now they celebrate the day of victory as a festival day each year.

David Frankfurter, a scholar of ancient religion, drew on Egyptian texts that portray Jews as worshippers of Set and associate them with cosmic disorder, as well as on the Egyptian practice of re-enacting mythic battles, to propose a reconstruction of the festival. He theorized that it involved a ritual re-dramatization of the victory, portraying the Jews as Typhonians (followers of Set-Typhon) and their defeat as the triumph of Horus-Pharaoh, with their expulsion framed as a purification of the land. The Egyptian priesthood, who had previously recast the Greek Ptolemaic rulers as traditional pharaohs, possibly led these celebrations, continuing an earlier priestly tradition that had produced anti-Jewish polemics through figures such as Manetho and Chaeremon of Alexandriaq. Frankfurter also suggested that the festival drew participants and spectators from diverse social groups, ranging from Greco-Egyptian elites to local Egyptian peasants. Its annual occurrence linked it to the agricultural cycle of the period, reinforcing its significance in the eyes of the local population.

== See also ==
=== Jewish–Roman wars ===
- First Jewish–Roman War (66–73 CE)
- Kitos War (115–117 CE)
- Bar Kokhba Revolt (132–136 CE)

=== Later Jewish and Samaritan revolts ===
- Jewish revolt against Constantius Gallus (352)
- Samaritan revolts (484–572)
- Jewish revolt against Heraclius (614–617/625)

=== Related topics ===
- Anilai and Asinai
- History of Alexandria
- History of the Jews in the Roman Empire
- List of conflicts in the Near East
