= Kitos War =

Part of the Second Jewish–Roman War

- Part of the Second Jewish–Roman War
- Map of Judaea (red), the Roman province where Jewish aspirations for independence had spurred the Jewish–Roman wars
| Date | 117 CE |
| Location | Judaea |
| Result | Roman victory |
| Territorial changes | Status quo ante bellum |

Belligerents
| Roman Empire | Jews |

Commanders and leaders
| Trajan #; Lusius Quietus X | Lukuas (executed); Julianus (executed) Pappus (executed); Gamliel II # |

Casualties and losses
| Roman & Greek deaths: 200,000 in Cyrene, 240,000 in Cyprus (per Cassius Dio). Unknown deaths in Egypt, Mesopotamia, Judea, and Syria. | Destruction and displacement of Jewish communities in North Africa, Cyrenaica, Cyprus, and Egypt |

The Kitos War took place in 117, as part of the Second Jewish–Roman War. Ancient Jewish sources date it to 52 years after the First Jewish–Roman War (66–73) and 16 years before the Bar Kokhba Revolt (132–136). Like other conflicts of the Jewish–Roman wars, the Kitos War was spurred by discontent among the Jews towards the Roman Empire. This sentiment, which most likely intensified significantly in the wake of the Roman destruction of the Second Temple in 70, had triggered another series of major Jewish uprisings throughout Judaea and the rest of the Near East, including Egypt, Libya, Cyprus, and Mesopotamia.

Following the suppression of the Mesopotamian Jewish revolt, the Roman emperor Trajan appointed his general Lusius Quietus (also known as Kitos) as consul and governor of Judaea. Late Syriac-language sources suggest that the Jewish rebels from Egypt and Libya relocated to Judaea, but were defeated there by the Roman army. However, the reliability of these sources is debated, and modern scholarship remains cautious with the lack of confirmation from the Greco-Roman historians Cassius Dio and Eusebius, who were the main sources for the events of the Second Jewish–Roman War.

A large number of Jews were executed by Roman troops besieging Lydda, where Jewish rebels had gathered under the leadership of brothers Julian and Pappus. These "slain of Lydda" are often mentioned in words of reverential praise in the Talmud.

Although they had successfully put down numerous Jewish revolts, the Romans' situation in Judaea remained tense, prompting Trajan's successor Hadrian to permanently move Legio VI Ferrata into Caesarea Maritima. This environment climaxed with the outbreak of the Bar Kokhba revolt shortly thereafter, beginning with the establishment of an independent Jewish state by the rebels and ending with the massacre and displacement of Jews throughout Judaea, as well as the likely destruction or near-destruction of three Roman legions.

== Name ==
Hebrew: פולמוס קיטוס, romanized: Polemos Ḳiṭus is a corruption (likely through Jewish Palestinian Aramaic) of Koine Greek: Πόλεμος του Κυήτου, romanized: Pólemos tou Kuḗtou, lit. 'Quietus' War', after the Roman governor of Judaea, Lusius Quietus, who put down the revolt.

The terms "Kitos War", "Diaspora Revolt" and "Second Jewish–Roman War" are often used interchangeably, but the first two terms are better understood as theatres of the latter larger conflict.

== Background ==
=== First Jewish Revolt (66–73 CE) ===
Tension between the Jewish population of the Roman Empire and the Greek and Roman populations mounted over the course of the 1st century CE, gradually escalating with various violent events, mainly throughout Judaea, where parts of the Judaean population occasionally erupted into violent insurrections against the Roman Empire. Several incidents also occurred in other parts of the empire, such as the Alexandria pogroms, targeting the large Jewish community of Alexandria in the province of Egypt. However, with the exception of Alexandria, the Jewish diaspora fared well throughout the Roman Empire and relied on the Roman state to maintain their rights.

The escalation of tensions finally erupted as the First Jewish–Roman War, which began in 66. Initial hostilities were the result of Greek and Jewish religious tensions but later escalated with anti-taxation protests and attacks upon Roman citizens. The Roman military garrison of Judaea was quickly overrun by rebels and the pro-Roman king Herod Agrippa II fled Jerusalem, together with Roman officials, to Galilee. Cestius Gallus, the legate of Syria, brought the Syrian army, based on XII Fulminata, reinforced by auxiliary troops, to restore order and quell the revolt. The legion, however, was ambushed and defeated by Jewish rebels at the Battle of Beth Horon, a result that shocked the Roman leadership.

The suppression of the revolt was then handed to General Vespasian and his son Titus, who assembled four legions and began advancing through the country, starting with Galilee in 67. The revolt ended when legions under Titus besieged and destroyed the center of rebel resistance in Jerusalem in 70 and defeated the remaining Jewish strongholds later on.

=== Jewish revolts in Egypt, Libya and Cyprus (115–117 CE) ===
In 115 CE, a wave of large-scale Jewish uprisings, known as the "Diaspora Revolt", erupted almost simultaneously across several provinces in the Eastern Mediterranean. The uprisings took place while Emperor Trajan was waging a military campaign against the Parthian Empire further east. The revolts appear to have been influenced by long-standing ethnic tensions, the destruction of the Second Temple, and revolutionary ideas spread by insurgents from Judaea. Additional factors fueling the unrest included the humiliating Jewish Tax imposed by Rome and widespread messianic expectations of divine redemption. Scholars believe that the rebels may have aimed at a return to Judaea, the re-establishment of Jewish sovereignty, and the rebuilding of the Temple.

In Libya, Jewish forces launched attacks against Greek and Roman populations under the leadership of either Andreas or Lukuas – possibly the same individual known by both names. In Egypt, the uprising reportedly began with clashes between Jewish communities and their Greek neighbors, which escalated when Lukuas and his followers arrived from Cyrenaica. They plundered the countryside and overcame local resistance. The Greeks, supported by Egyptian peasants and Romans, retaliated, massacring the Jews of Alexandria. In Cyprus, Jewish rebels under Artemion's leadership reportedly devastated the island and the city of Salamis.

The Roman response was severe. Marcius Turbo, initially deployed against the Parthians, was redirected to suppress the revolts in Egypt and Libya with a large military force. His campaigns were marked by extreme brutality, leading to the near-extermination of Jewish populations in Cyrenaica, Cyprus, and Egypt. By late 117, the revolts had been largely quelled, though some disturbances in Egypt may have continued into early 118. In the aftermath, Jewish communities in the affected regions suffered immense losses, with archaeological evidence indicating severe destruction, particularly in Cyrene, which required reconstruction under Hadrian.

=== Quietus in Mesopotamia (116 CE) ===
Ancient sources state that, alongside the Jewish uprisings in Egypt, Libya, and Cyprus, unrest also erupted in Mesopotamia following its recent conquest by the Romans from the Parthians. Cassius Dio describes a rebellion in the region during the summer of 116 CE, noting that General Lusius Quietus played a key role in suppressing it, retaking Nisibis and sacking Edessa, though he does not specifically mention Jewish involvement.

In contrast, Eusebius explicitly attributes activities in Mesopotamia to the Jews, reporting that Trajan suspected them of planning attacks against the inhabitants, prompting him to order Quietus to suppress them harshly. Eusebius further states that Quietus "murdered a great number of the Jews there." Later Christian sources also mention a military campaign led by Quietus against Jewish communities in the region. Jewish resistance in Mesopotamia may have been part of a wider movement against Roman occupation in the Parthian territories, likely fueled by the contrast between their relatively privileged status under Parthian rule and the harsher conditions imposed by the Romans.

== Unrest in Judaea ==
Following his suppression of rebel resistance in Mesopotamia, Quietus was honored with the consulship and given the governorship of Judaea by Trajan. The exact events at this stage remain unclear, (Note: Cassius Dio and Eusebius, the primary sources on the diaspora uprisings of this period, make no mention of events in Judaea at that time.) but according to scholars such as Pucci Ben Zeev, there appears to have been a wave of Jewish unrest that Lucius Quietus suppressed.

Cassius Dio and Eusebius, the main sources on the diaspora uprisings of this period, do not mention events in Judaea at the time. However, fragmented and later accounts offer some insight. One such piece of evidence is an inscription from Sardinia, which records an expeditio Judaeae among the wars fought by Trajan. Additionally, two late Syriac sources suggest that Jewish rebels from Egypt and Libya moved to Judaea, where they were defeated by the Romans.

Hostilities may have been stoked by Roman cult acts in Jerusalem. According to Hippolytus, a legion brought by Trajan erected an idol identified as Kore on the Temple Mount, an act that would have been perceived by Jews as a direct desecration of their holiest site. Epigraphic evidence points to a similar provocation: an inscription attests that soldiers of Legio III Cyrenaica dedicated an altar or statue to the Greco-Egyptian god Serapis in Jerusalem during the final year of Trajan's reign (116 CE).

Rabbinic sources recount the story of Julian and Pappus, which may have taken place during this period of unrest in Judaea. It is possible that Quietus laid siege to Lydda, where the rebel Jews had gathered under the leadership of Julian and Pappus. The distress became so great that the patriarch Rabban Gamaliel II, who was shut up there and died soon afterwards, permitted fasting even on Ḥanukkah. Other rabbis condemned that measure. Lydda was then taken, and many of the rebellious Jews were executed; the "slain of Lydda" are often mentioned in words of reverential praise in the Talmud. Pappus and Julian were among those executed by the Romans that year, and became martyrs among the Jews.

Lusius Quietus, whom Trajan had held in high regard and who had served Rome well, was quietly stripped of his command once Hadrian had secured the imperial title. He was murdered in unknown circumstances in the summer of 118, possibly by the orders of Hadrian. Hadrian took the unpopular decisions to end the war, abandon many of Trajan's eastern conquests, and stabilise the eastern borders. Although he abandoned the province of Mesopotamia, he installed Parthamaspates—who had been ejected from Ctesiphon by the returning Osroes—as king of a restored Osroene. For a century, Osroene retained a precarious independence as a buffer state between both empires. The situation in Judaea remained tense for the Romans, who were obliged under Hadrian to move the Legio VI Ferrata permanently into Caesarea Maritima in Judaea.

Some scholars dispute that any conflict occurred in Judaea during the Diaspora Revolt. Historians Eric M. Meyers and Mark A. Chancey, for example, write that "the rebellion did not apparently spread to Judea, where the arrival of a second legion to complement the Tenth Legion provided a successful buffer against further uprisings." Similarly, Fergus Millar notes that "there is no concrete evidence for a Jewish revolt in Judaea" concurrent with the Diaspora Revolt.

== Aftermath ==
=== Provincial status change and increased military presence ===
After the Kitos War, Judaea underwent administrative and military restructuring. The province was elevated from praetorian to consular status, allowing for a strengthened military presence. As part of this change, a second legion, likely Legio II Traiana, was stationed in the region by c. 120 CE. Following Quietus, subsequent governors of the province also held consular rank. Among them were Lucius Cossonius Gallus, who was appointed consul in 116 and governed Judaea between 118 and 120, and Quintus Coredius Gallus Gargilius Antiquus, consul suffectus in 119, who served as governor between 122 and 125.

=== Bar Kokhba revolt ===
Further developments took place in Judaea in 130 CE, when Hadrian visited the Eastern Mediterranean and decided to rebuild the ruined city of Jerusalem as the Roman colony of Aelia Capitolina, named after himself. This decision, along with a possible ban on circumcision, led to the outbreak of the Bar Kokhba revolt, the final major Jewish uprising and last organized attempt to regain national independence. The rebels initially secured victories against the Romans, briefly establishing an independent state and severely straining Roman military resources. In response, Rome mobilized a massive force and crushed the rebellion with an unprecedented assault on Judaea's Jewish population, mass enslavement and displacement, the destruction of the Judaean countryside, and a ban on Jewish practices, which remained in effect until Hadrian's death in 138. Judaea was renamed Syria Palaestina.

== See also ==
=== Jewish–Roman wars ===
- First Jewish–Roman War (66–73 CE)
- Diaspora Revolt (115–117 CE)
- Bar Kokhba Revolt (132–136 CE)

=== Later Jewish and Samaritan revolts ===
- Jewish revolt against Constantius Gallus (352)
- Samaritan revolts (484–572)
- Jewish revolt against Heraclius (614–617/625)

=== Related topics ===
- History of the Jews in the Roman Empire
- List of Jewish civil wars
- List of conflicts in the Near East

== Bibliography ==
- Barclay, John M.G. (1998). Jews in the Mediterranean Diaspora: From Alexander to Trajan (323 BCE–117 CE). Edinburgh: T&T Clark. ISBN 978-0567-08651-8.
- Bennett, Julian (2005) [1997]. Trajan Optimus Princeps: A Life and Times (e-Library ed.). London and New York: Routledge. ISBN 0-203-36056-7.
- Ben Zeev, Miriam (2018). "New Insights into Roman Policy in Judea on the Eve of the Bar Kokhba Revolt". Journal for the Study of Judaism in the Persian, Hellenistic, and Roman Period. 49 (1). Brill: 84–107. doi:10.1163/15700631-12481193. JSTOR 26551240.
- Eshel, Hanan (2006). "The Bar Kochba Revolt, 132–135". In Katz, Steven T. (ed.). The Late Roman-Rabbinic Period. The Cambridge History of Judaism. Vol. 4th. Cambridge University Press. ISBN 978-0-521-77248-8.
- Goodman, Martin (2004). "Trajan and the Origins of Roman Hostility to the Jews". Past & Present (182): 3–29. doi:10.1093/past/182.1.3. JSTOR 3600803.
- Hacham, Noah; Ilan, Tal, eds. (2022). The Early Roman Period (30 BCE–117 CE). Corpus Papyrorum Judaicarum. Vol. 5. De Gruyter Oldenbourg. doi:10.1515/9783110787764. ISBN 978-3-110-78599-9.
- Horbury, William (2014). Jewish War under Trajan and Hadrian. Cambridge University Press. ISBN 978-1-139-04905-4.
- Horbury, William (2021). "Jewish Egypt in the Light of the Risings under Trajan". In Salvesen, Alison; Pearce, Sarah; Frenkel, Miriam (eds.). Israel in Egypt: The Land of Egypt as Concept and Reality for Jews in Antiquity and the Early Medieval Period. Ancient Judaism and Early Christianity. Vol. 110. Leiden & Boston: Brill. pp. 347–366. ISBN 978-90-04-43539-1.
- Isaac, Benjamin (1990). The Limits of Empire: The Roman Army in the East. Oxford University Press. ISBN 978-0-198-14952-1.
- Kerkeslager, Allen (2006). "The Jews in Egypt and Cyrenaica, 66–c. 235 CE". In Katz, Steven T. (ed.). The Late Roman-Rabbinic Period. The Cambridge History of Judaism. Vol. 4. Cambridge University Press. ISBN 978-0-521-77248-8.
- Magness, Jodi (2024). Jerusalem Through The Ages: From Its Beginnings To The Crusades. New York, NY: Oxford University Press. ISBN 978-0-19-093780-5.
- Meyers, Eric M.; Chancey, Mark A. (2012). Alexander to Constantine: Archaeology of the Land of the Bible, Volume III. The Anchor Yale Bible Reference Library. Yale University Press. ISBN 978-0-300-14179-5.
- Millar, Fergus (1995). The Roman Near East: 31 BC–AD 337. Harvard University Press. ISBN 978-0-674-77886-3.
- Mor, Menahem (2016). The Second Jewish Revolt: The Bar Kokhba War, 132–136 CE. Brill. ISBN 978-90-04-31463-4.
- Pucci Ben Zeev, Miriam (2006). "The Uprisings in the Jewish Diaspora, 116–117". In Katz, Steven T. (ed.). The Late Roman-Rabbinic Period. The Cambridge History of Judaism. Vol. 4. Cambridge: Cambridge University Press. pp. 93–104. doi:10.1017/CHOL9780521772488.005. ISBN 978-0-521-77248-8.
- Smallwood, E. Mary (1976). "The Jewish Revolt of AD 115–117". The Jews under Roman Rule from Pompey to Diocletian. SBL Press. pp. 389–427. doi:10.1163/9789004502048_023. ISBN 978-90-04-50204-8.
- Taylor, J. E. (2012). The Essenes, the Scrolls, and the Dead Sea. Oxford University Press. ISBN 9780199554485.
- Walker, Susan (2002). "Hadrian and the Renewal of Cyrene". Libyan Studies. 33. Society for Libyan Studies: 45–56. doi:10.1017/S0263718900005112.
- Zissu, Boaz (2018). "Interbellum Judea 70–132 ce: An Archaeological Perspective". In Schwartz, Joshua J.; Tomson, Peter J. (eds.). Jews and Christians in the First and Second Centuries: The Interbellum 70‒132 CE. Compendia Rerum Iudaicarum ad Novum Testamentum. Vol. 15. Brill. pp. 19–49. doi:10.1163/9789004352971_011. ISBN 978-90-04-35297-1.
