= Lukuas =

One of the leaders of Jewish rebels during the Kitos War

Lukuas was one of the leaders of Jewish rebels in Libya during the Diaspora Revolt of 115–117 CE. The narrative of the revolt under Lukuas is told by Eusebius of Caesarea, Michael Syrus, Bar Hebraeus and Cassius Dio, with the latter giving him a quite different Greek name of "Andreas". Very little is known regarding his life and political career beyond these passing references. Eusebius of Caesarea ascribes him the title of "King", leading many later scholars to believe he attempted to assume the title of "King of the Jews" during his political career, but actually there is scarcely any real evidence of a religious connection to that ascribed title.

== Kitos War ==
In 115 large scale Jewish revolts, known as the Diaspora Revolt, erupted across the eastern parts of Roman Empire. In Cyrenaica, the Jewish rebels were led by one Lukuas (or Andreas/Andrew), who called himself "king" (according to Eusebius of Caesarea). His group destroyed many temples, including those to Hecate, Jupiter, Apollo, Artemis, and Isis, as well as the civil structures that were symbols of Rome, including the Caesareum, the basilica, and the public baths.

Lukuas then moved towards Alexandria, entered and set fire to the city. Alexandria had been abandoned by the Roman troops in Egypt under the leadership of governor Marcus Rutilius Lupus. The pagan temples and the tomb of Pompey were destroyed. Trajan sent new troops under the praefectus praetorio Quintus Marcius Turbo, but Egypt and Cyrenaica were pacified only in autumn 117.

In the aftermath, Lukuas fled to Roman Judea. Marcius Turbo pursued him and sentenced to death the brothers Julian and Pappus, who had been key leaders in the rebellion. Lusius Quietus, the conqueror of the Jews of Mesopotamia, was now in command of the Roman army in Judea, and laid siege to Lydda, where the rebel Jews had gathered under the leadership of Julian and Pappus. The distress became so great that the patriarch Rabban Gamaliel II, who was shut up there and died soon afterwards, permitted fasting even on Ḥanukkah. Other rabbis condemned this measure. Lydda fell soon after and many of the Jews were executed; the "slain of Lydda" are often mentioned in words of reverential praise in the Talmud. Pappus and Julian were among those executed by the Romans in the same year.

== See also ==
- Simon bar Kokhba
