= Adar =

12th month of the Hebrew calendar

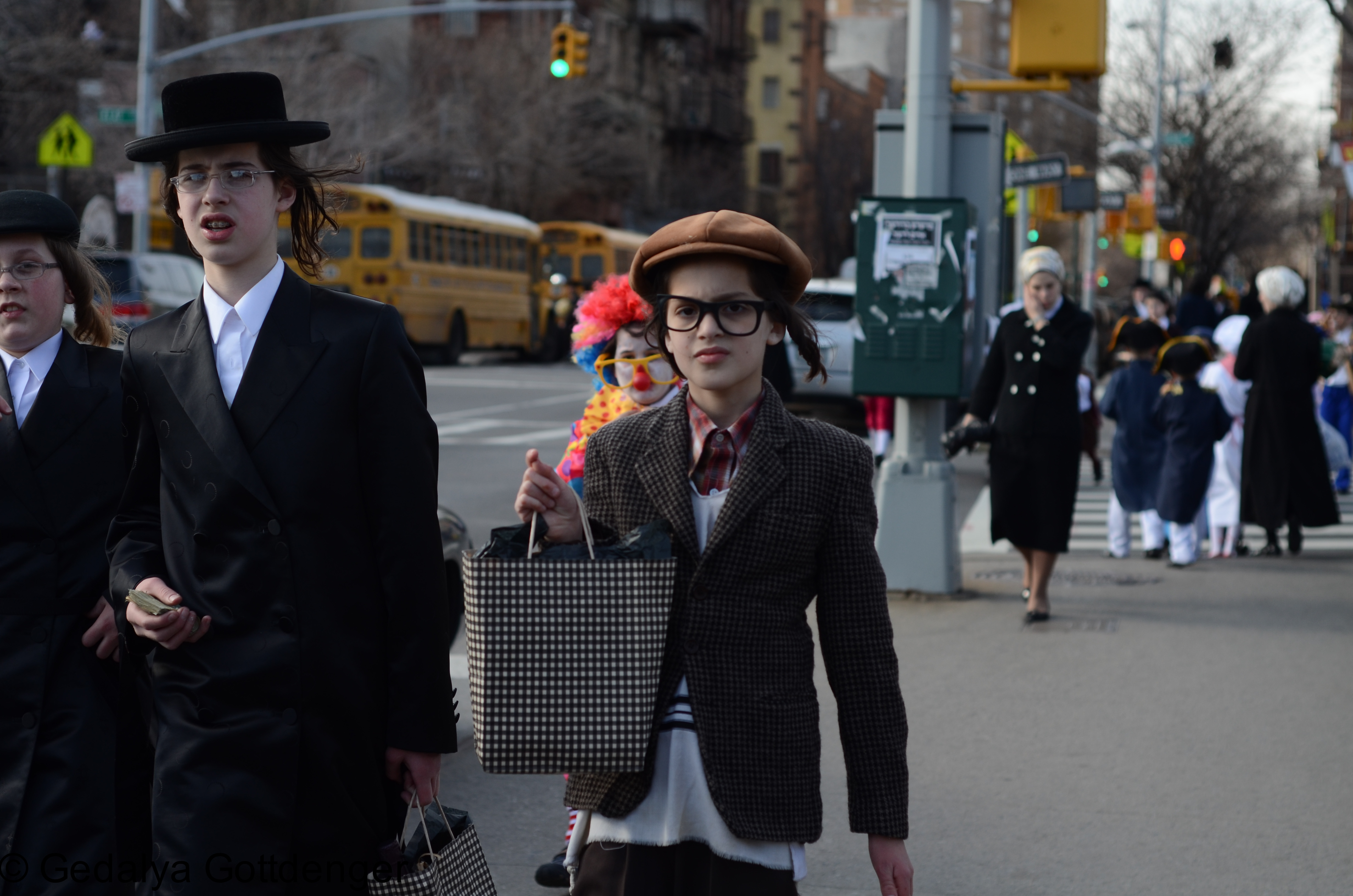
- Hasidic Jews celebrating Purim, the holiday of the deliverance of the Jewish people in the ancient Achaemenid Empire 474 BCE
- Native name: אֲדָר (Hebrew)
- Calendar: Hebrew calendar
- Month number: 12 and 13 (in leap years)
- Number of days: 29 (30 Adar I and 29 Adar II in leap years)
- Season: Winter (Northern Hemisphere)
- Gregorian equivalent: February–March
- Significant days: Seventh of Adar; Fast of Esther; Purim

Adar (Hebrew: אֲדָר, ʾĂdār; from Akkadian adaru) is the sixth month of the civil year and the twelfth month of the religious year on the Hebrew calendar, roughly corresponding to the month of March in the Gregorian calendar. It is a month of 29 days.

In the Talmud, Adar is considered an especially joyous month, owing to Purim, which is situated in the middle of the month. This sentiment is expressed in the Talmudic declaration:

When the month of Adar begins, one increases rejoicing.

The Talmud also associates Adar with good luck and suggests scheduling court cases during this month.

== Names and leap years ==
The month's name, like all the others from the Hebrew calendar, was adopted during the Babylonian captivity. In the Babylonian calendar the name was Araḫ Addaru or Adār ('Month of Adar').

In leap years, it is preceded by a 30-day intercalary month named Adar Aleph (Hebrew: אדר א׳, aleph being the first letter of the Hebrew alphabet), also known as "Adar Rishon" (First Adar) or "Adar I", and it is then itself called Adar Bet (Hebrew: אדר ב׳, bet being the second letter of the Hebrew alphabet), also known as "Adar Sheni" (Second Adar) or "Adar II". Occasionally instead of Adar I and Adar II, "Adar" and "Ve'Adar" are used (Ve means 'and' thus: And-Adar). Adar I and II occur during February–March on the Gregorian calendar.

Sources disagree as to which of the two Adar months is the "real" Adar, and which is the added leap month.

== Customs ==
It is customary to increase in joy during the month of Adar. It is also considered a lucky month and court dates should be set to the month of Adar.

During the Second Temple period, there was a Jewish custom to make a public proclamation on the first day of the lunar month Adar, reminding the people that they are to prepare their annual monetary offering to the Temple treasury, known as the half-Shekel.

== Holidays ==
- 7 Adar (II in leap years) – 7th of Adar – some fast on this day in memory of the death of Moses
- 13 Adar (II in leap years) – Fast of Esther – on 11 Adar when the 13th falls on Shabbat – (Fast Day)
- 14 Adar (II in leap years) – Purim
- 14 Adar I (does not exist in non-leap years; Karaites celebrate in Adar II) – Purim Katan
- 15 Adar (II in leap years) – Shushan Purim – celebration of Purim in walled cities existing during the time of Joshua
- 17 Adar (II in leap years) – Yom Adar celebration feast

== In Jewish history ==
- 1 Adar [II] (1167/4 CE) – Death of the Ibn Ezra
- 1 Adar (circa 1663) – Death of the Shach
- 2 Adar (598 BCE) – Jerusalem falls to Nebuchadnezzar and Jeconiah is captured.
- 2 Adar (1941 CE) – Death of Rabbi Yaakov Yehezkiya Greenwald of Pupa
- 3 Adar (515 BCE) – Second Temple completed
- 4 Adar (1307) – Maharam's body ransomed 14 years after his death by Alexander ben Shlomo (Susskind) Wimpfen.
- 4 Adar (1796) – Death of Rabbi Leib Sarah's, a disciple of the Rabbi Israel Baal Shem Tov. One of the "hidden tzaddikim," Rabbi Leib spent his life wandering from place to place to raise money for the ransoming of imprisoned Jews and the support of other hidden tzaddikim.
- 4 Adar [II] (1992 CE) Death of Menachem Begin
- 5 Adar (1st century CE) – Lulianos and Paphos voluntarily gave themselves up to be killed, to save innocent Jewish lives in Laodicea.
- 6 Adar (1 BCE) - The Roman Senate confirms Herod as King of Judea.
- 7 Adar (1393 BCE) – Birth of Moses
- 7 Adar (1273 BCE) – Death of Moses
- 7 Adar (1828) – Death of Rebbe Isaac Taub of Kalov, founder of the Kalover Hasidic dynasty, and a student of Rabbi Leib Sarah's.
- 9 Adar (1st century BCE) – Academic dissension between Beit Hillel and Beit Shammai, erupted into a violent and destructive conflict over a vote on 18 legal matters leading to the death of 3,000 students. The day was later declared a fast day by the Shulchan Aruch, however, it was never observed as such.
- 10 Adar (1799) - Napoleon Bonaparte issues his proclamation inviting Jews to reestablish a homeland while campaigning in the Levant.
- 11 Adar (18th century) – Death of Reb Eliezer Lipman (Elezer Lippe), father of the prominent Chassidic Rebbes Rabbi Elimelech of Lizhensk and Rabbi Zusha of Hanipol.
- 12 Adar (2nd century CE) - Trajan's Day (יום טוריינוס) commemorating the heroic martyrs Lulianos and Paphos for standing up to Roman emperor Trajan (mentioned in Megillat Taanit).
- 13 Adar (474 BCE) – War between Jews and their enemies in Persia (Book of Esther, chapter 9).
- 13 Adar (161 BCE) – Yom Nicanor – The Maccabees defeated Greek Syrian general Nicanor at the Battle of Adasa during the Maccabean Revolt.
- 13 Adar (1895–1986) – Death of Rabbi Moshe Feinstein
- 14 Adar (474 BCE) – Purim victory celebrated in the Persian Empire
- 15 Adar (474 BCE) – Purim Victory Celebrated in Shushan
- 15 Adar (1st century CE) – Jerusalem Gate Day – King Agrippa I (circa 21 CE) began construction of a gate for the wall of Jerusalem; the day used to be celebrated as a holiday.
- 17 Adar (522 BCE) – Yom Adar – the day the Jewish people left Persia following the Purim story
- 18 Adar [1953] – Death of Josef Stalin; brings to a stop the Doctors' Plot
- 20 Adar (1st century BCE) – Choni the Circle Maker prays for rain (Talmud, Taanit 23a)
- 20 Adar (1616 CE) – 'Purim Vinz': downfall of Vincenz Fettmilch and triumphant return of the Jews of Frankfurt under Imperial protection. The day was established as a community Purim for generations and to this day the Washington Heights community does not recite Tachanun on this day.
- 20 Adar (1640) – Death of the "Bach"
- 21 Adar (Adar II, 1786) – Death of Rabbi Elimelech of Lizhensk
- 23 Adar (circa 1312 BCE) – Mishkan assembled for the first time; "Seven Days of Training" begin.
- 23 Adar (1866) – Death of Yitzchak Meir Alter, first Rebbe of Ger
- 24 Adar (1817) – The Blood Libel, the accusation that Jews murdered Christian children for their blood, declared false by Czar Alexander I. Nevertheless, nearly a hundred years later the accusation was officially leveled against Mendel Beilis in Kyiv.
- 25 Adar (561 BCE) – Death of Nebuchadnezzar (Jeremiah 52:31).
- 25 Adar (1761) – Death of Rabbi Abraham Gershon of Kitov the brother-in-law and leading foe-turned-disciple of the Baal Shem Tov.
- 27 Adar (561 BCE) – Death of Zedekiah in Babylonian captivity. Meroduch, Nebuchadnezzar's son and successor, freed him (and his nephew Jeconiah) on the 27th of Adar, but Zedekiah died that same day.
- 28 Adar (from the 2nd century onwards) – Talmudic holiday to commemorate the rescinding of a Roman decree against Torah study, ritual circumcision, and keeping the Shabbat. The decree was revoked through the efforts of Rabbi Yehudah ben Shamu'a and his colleagues. (Megillat Taanit, a baraita on this matter can still be found in Ta'anit 18a and Rosh Hashanah 19a)
- 28 Adar (1524) – the Jews of Cairo were saved from the plot of Ahmad Pasha, who sought revenge against the Jewish minister Abraham de Castro who had informed Selim II of Ahmad's plan to cede from the Ottoman Empire. To this day, Adar 28th is considered the Purim of Cairo, with festivities including a special Megilah reading.

== See also ==
- Adar or Ada is Sindarin for "father".
- Azar or Adhar (Arabic: آذار) is the name for the month of March in the Levant.
- Arabic names of calendar months
- Jewish astrology
