= Lulianos and Paphos =

In rabbinic literature, two wealthy Jewish brothers who lived in Laodicea

Lulianos and Paphos (alt. sp. Julianus and Pappus, second-century CE) were two wealthy Jewish brothers who lived in Laodicea on the Lycus in Anatolia, contemporaries with Joshua ben Hananiah, and who suffered martyrdom at the hands of the Roman legate.

An anecdote about the lives of these two illustrious Grecian-Jewish citizens has come down in the Midrashic literature stating that, during the days of Hadrian, the emperor mulled over the thought of rebuilding Israel's Temple. When the news reached Lulianos and Paphos who were very wealthy, they set-up tables from Acco to Antioch, hoping thereby to allow Jewish pilgrims to exchange their local currency for coins in specie, or else provide other basic needs for the people before proceeding on to Jerusalem.

In the Babylonian Talmud is mentioned the "slain of Lydia" [sic] (another name for Laodicea on the Lycus) and which Talmudic commentators have explained to be referring to two Jewish brothers with Hellenized names, Julian (Lulianos) of Alexandria and Paphos, the son of Judah, who willingly made themselves martyrs to save the entire Jewish population of Laodicea from annihilation. Their real names were Shamayah and Ahiyah. According to ancient Jewish accounts, a non Jewish child had been found slain in their city. The blame for the child's murder was laid upon the Jews of that city. The governor intervened by threatening to kill all the Jews of the city, unless the perpetrator of the vile act would deliver himself up to be punished. When no one could be found to take responsibility for the act and the governor was insistent on punishing all the Jews, Lulianos and Paphos, being "wholly righteous men," willingly took responsibility for the death of the child and were duly executed. Their deaths on the fifth day of the lunar month Adar were marked by public fasting among Jews, each year on the anniversary of their deaths.

== Account of martyrdom ==
According to the Talmud and Midrash, Lulianos' and Paphos' executioner was a man named Trajanus (Turyannos). When Trajanus desired to kill Lulianos and Paphos, elsewhere described as being on account of their confessing to the murder of a young gentile girl, the daughter of a king, who was found slain in the city –– for the gentiles of that city had laid the blame upon the Jews of the city, and they were about to take vengeance upon the entire Jewish population until Lulianos and his brother, Paphos, confessed to the murder (which they had not committed, but only confessed to save the lives of their fellow countrymen), the two men were summoned before Trajanus for questioning. Trajanus began their trial by mocking them, saying to them: "If you are from the nation of Hananiah, Mishael, and Azariah, let your God come and save you from my hand, just as He saved Hananiah, Mishael, and Azariah from the hand of Nebuchadnezzar." To this they replied: "Hananiah, Mishael, and Azariah were full-fledged righteous people, and they were worthy that a miracle should be performed for them, and Nebuchadnezzar was a worthy king, and it was fitting that a miracle be performed through him, but you are merely an unjust commoner, and one who is not fitting that a miracle be performed through him, seeing that we have been condemned to destruction by the Omnipresent [for our misdeeds]. And if you do not kill us, the Omnipresent has many other executioners. And if men do not kill us, the Omnipresent has many bears and lions in His world that can hurt us and kill us. Instead, the Holy One, Blessed be He, placed us into your hands only so that He will avenge our blood in the future."

No sooner had he killed them than dispatches (tabula) arrived from Rome (others say two officials, or two emissaries, carrying orders against their execution), but since the act had already been done by the Roman soldier, he, himself, was sentenced to die by way of "cudgeling" (fustuarium), a form of capital punishment inflicted upon Roman soldiers for the highest military offenses. (Note: Or what is also called fusti percutere.)

Some scholars ascribe these events to Lusius Quietus of Lysia, when he was appointed Roman governor of Judaea by Trajan, and who was later punished by Hadrian the emperor. The difficulty, however, with this assumption is that the primary sources all place these events in Laodicea, a place in Asia Minor and far away from the jurisdiction of Lusius Quietus.

== Reaction ==
The deliverance of the city's Jewish community was received with relief by world's Jewry, and the day on which their executioner had been killed himself, the 12th day of the lunar month Adar, was transcribed in the Jewish record books and in the Scroll of Fasting as a day of public celebration, and one whereon it was forbidden for Jews to fast. Later, the day of celebration was cancelled, since two great rabbis, Abtalion and Shemaiah, were known to have been executed some years earlier on the same day.
