= Marcius Turbo =

2nd century Praetorian Prefect and imperial military advisor

Quintus Marcius Turbo was prefect of the Praetorian Guard and a close friend and military advisor to both emperor Trajan and Hadrian during the early 2nd century.

== Early life ==
Little is known about Turbo's early life. Few records or references provide reliable information regarding his life before he became a soldier. However, it is known that he was born in the late 1st century and came from a city in western Greece called Epidaurus, which was a place well known for its religious temples and healing centers. It is thought he held the rank of primipilus at one point.

== Career ==
The first record of Turbo appears in 113, during the reign of emperor Trajan. At the time, he was the commander of the Classis Misenensis, the most senior fleet of the Roman Navy and under the direct control of the emperor. Under Turbo's command, the fleet sailed to the east to take part in Trajan's invasion of the Parthian Empire sometime between 113 AD and 116 AD.

Approximately at the same time, large portions of the Jewish population in the Empire rose in rebellion, uprisings taking place almost simultaneously in Judea, Egypt, Libya, Cyprus, and parts of Mesopotamia. The grain supply from Egypt to Rome was threatened. With local authorities unable to quell the rebellion, Trajan sent Turbo, by then one of his best military men and closest confidants, to Egypt to deal with the situation. Turbo reestablished control over Egypt and eventually Cyprus. Turbo became the military Prefect of Egypt for several years while the province went through a process of rehabilitation.

In 117, Trajan died and was succeeded by his adopted son Hadrian. From the beginning of Hadrian's reign, Turbo was a close friend, adviser, and confidant of Hadrian. After the Jewish revolt had been quelled, Turbo accompanied Hadrian to Mauretania in North Africa, where they jointly led a military campaign against local rebels; later, Hadrian left Turbo in control of the campaign. As another example of how much Hadrian trusted Turbo, he put Turbo in charge of two provinces in North Africa, Mauretania Caesariensis and Mauretania Tingitana.

After his tenure as governor, Turbo, at the request of Hadrian, accepted control of the Danubian Command, part of the Roman military's presence in the eastern area of the Empire near the Danube River. Turbo was in charge of the Danubian Command till 123. Just after this appointment, unrest broke out in the Roman province of Dacia. Turbo was immediately sent to Dacia and managed to stop any rebellion from materializing. Hadrian, in collaboration with Turbo, split Dacia into two regions in the hope of making the province more manageable and less rebellious. These two new regions were called Dacia Superior and Dacia Inferior. After his tenure as the leader of the Danubian command, Turbo went to Rome.

Hadrian, famous for his long and extensive travels throughout the empire, realized that he needed a reliable representative in Rome while he was away. Therefore, in 125, Hadrian elevated Turbo to the position of Praetorian prefect, that is, commander of the Praetorian Guard. He held this title until 134. It is at this point that no more records are found of him. It seems possible that Turbo, along with many others, fell out of favor with Hadrian later in his reign; however, it is also possible that Turbo died from natural causes.

== Significance and contemporary assessment ==
Without a doubt, Turbo had an illustrious career that was made all the more noteworthy because he was from Greece and not Italy. Up to this point in time, the high positions of the Roman government were still reserved for the men of noble and aristocratic families of Roman heritage. However, Turbo's life shows that the general trend inside of the aristocracy was towards a more egalitarian system where one's knowledge, skills, and accomplishments were just as important as one's family and ancestors. The Roman historian Cassius Dio described Turbo as “loyal, assiduous and vigilant.”

== Bibliography ==
- Syme, Ronald. "Guard Prefects of Trajan and Hadrian", Journal of Roman Studies, 70 (1980), pp. 64–80.
- Smallwood, Mary E. Palestine A.D. 115-118, 4th ed. Vol. 11. Franz Steiner Verlag. 500–10.
- Syme, Ronald. "The Wrong Marcius Turbo", Journal of Roman Studies, 51 (1962), pp. 87–96.
- Wade, Donald W. "Some Governors of Dacia: A Rearrangement," Classical Philology, 64 (1969), pp. 105–107.
- "Trajan (c. 53-117)." DISCovering Biography. Online ed. Detroit: Gale, 2003. Student Resource Center - Gold. Gale. Sacred Heart Preparatory (BAISL). 26 November 2008 http://find.galegroup.com/ips/start.do?prodId=IPS
- "Hadrian, Emperor of Rome (76-138)." DISCovering World History. Online ed. Detroit: Gale, 2003. Student Resource Center - Gold. Gale. Sacred Heart Preparatory (BAISL). 26 November 2008 <http://find.galegroup.com/ips/start.do?prodId=IPS>.
