= Lusius Quietus =

2nd-century Roman-Moorish general and governor of Judaea

Quintus Lusius Quietus or simply known as Lusius Quietus (Latin: Lusius Quiētus, pronounced [ˈɫʊ.si.ʊs kᶣiˈeː.tʊs]; Koine Greek: Λούσιος Κυήτος, romanized: Loúsios Kyítos, pronounced [ˈlu.si.os kyˈi.tos]) was a Roman Berber general and 11th legate of Judaea from 117 AD. He was the principal commander against the Jewish rebellion known as the Kitos War (Kitos is a later corruption of Quietus). He was notably one of the most important Berber statesmen in ancient Roman history. After the death of the emperor Trajan, Quietus was murdered or executed, possibly on the orders of Trajan's successor Hadrian.

== Life ==
Based on descriptions of his dark complexion, historical Wim den Boer hypothesized that Lusius was of Ethiopian origin, while others suggested a Punic background due to his surname, which was typical of Proconsular Africa. However, these theories remain unverified due to a lack of evidence. According to the contemporary roman historian Cassius Dio, Lusius Quietus was a Mauri prince from an unconquered tribe in Mauretania. Recent historical studies support this view, concluding that he belonged to the Baquates, an independent native tribe of Mauretania Tingitana.

== Citizen and commander ==
Lusius's father allied himself with Rome during the revolt of Aedemon, contributing to the Roman conquest of Mauretania Tingitana; for this he was honored with the gift of Roman citizenship for himself and his family.

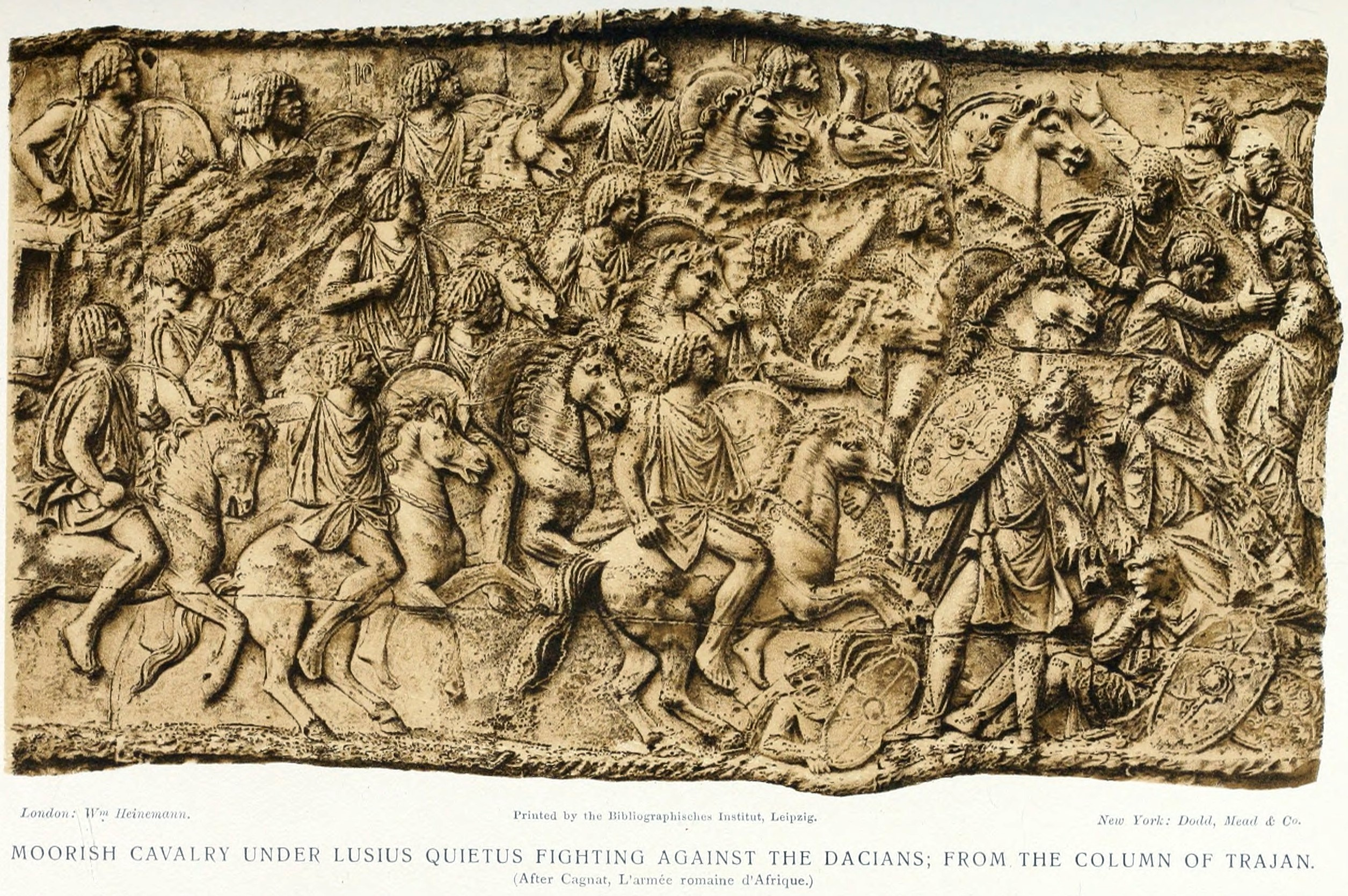
Stylised Berber Cavalry under Lusius Quietus, fighting against the Dacians. From the Column of Trajan.

His son Lusius later joined the Roman army and served as an auxiliary officer in the Roman cavalry. For outstanding service, emperor Domitian rewarded him with equestrian rank but later had him dismissed from service for unknown reasons.

Quietus's fortunes were revived once again when a new emperor, Trajan, came to power. Quietus was brought back into the army and served as one of the emperor's commanders of the cavalry auxilia during the Trajan's Dacian Wars (his bareheaded Berber cavalry can be seen on Trajan's Column in Rome). After the successful conquest of Dacia, Quietus was elevated to the position of senator. He next served with the emperor during his campaign in Parthia during which he led a brilliant rearguard action, which allowed the tactical withdrawal of troops and saved them from destruction. This action brought Quietus acclaim and ensured he was well known to the army.

During the emperor's Parthian campaign in 115–116, Quietus sacked the cities of Nisibis and Edessa.

The Diaspora Revolt, a series of major uprisings by Jews in the diaspora, occurred in 115–117 in Cyrene (Cyrenaica), Cyprus, Mesopotamia, and Roman Egypt. These uprisings involved the ransacking of towns and the slaughter of Roman citizens and others. When the inhabitants of Babylonia revolted, they were suppressed by Quietus, who was rewarded by being appointed governor of Judaea. There, he faced a period of unrest later known in rabbinic sources as the Kitos War, a name derived from Quietus. Quietus took the city of Lydda and methodically set about defeating the rebellions.

== Death ==
Emperor Trajan died later in the year and was succeeded by Hadrian and the rebellion in Judaea was finally crushed by Quietus. Quietus was murdered later in the year (118) and it has been theorized that Quietus was assassinated on the orders of the new emperor, Hadrian, for fear of Quietus' popular standing with the army and his close connections to Trajan. A Talmudic story also relates that the Roman general who defeated the rebellious Jews at this time was suddenly executed.

== Bibliography ==
- Bartolomeo Borghesi, Œuvres, i. 500;
- Heinrich Graetz, Geschichte. 3d ed., iv. 116 et seq., 407 et seq.;
- Emil Schürer, Geschichte 3d ed., i. 617, 666–670;
- Prosopographia Imperii Romani, ii. 308, No. 325;
- Adolf Schlatter, Die Tage Trajans und Hadrians, p. 90, (Gütersloh, 1897.)
- Michael Brett and Elisabeth Fentress. The Berbers pp. 54–55. Blackwell, 1996. ISBN 978-0-631-20767-2

== See also ==
- Roman Prefects and Procurators of Judaea Province, AD 6-132 AD
