= Romaniote Jews =

Greek-speaking Jewish community

Romaniotes
Ρωμανιώτες
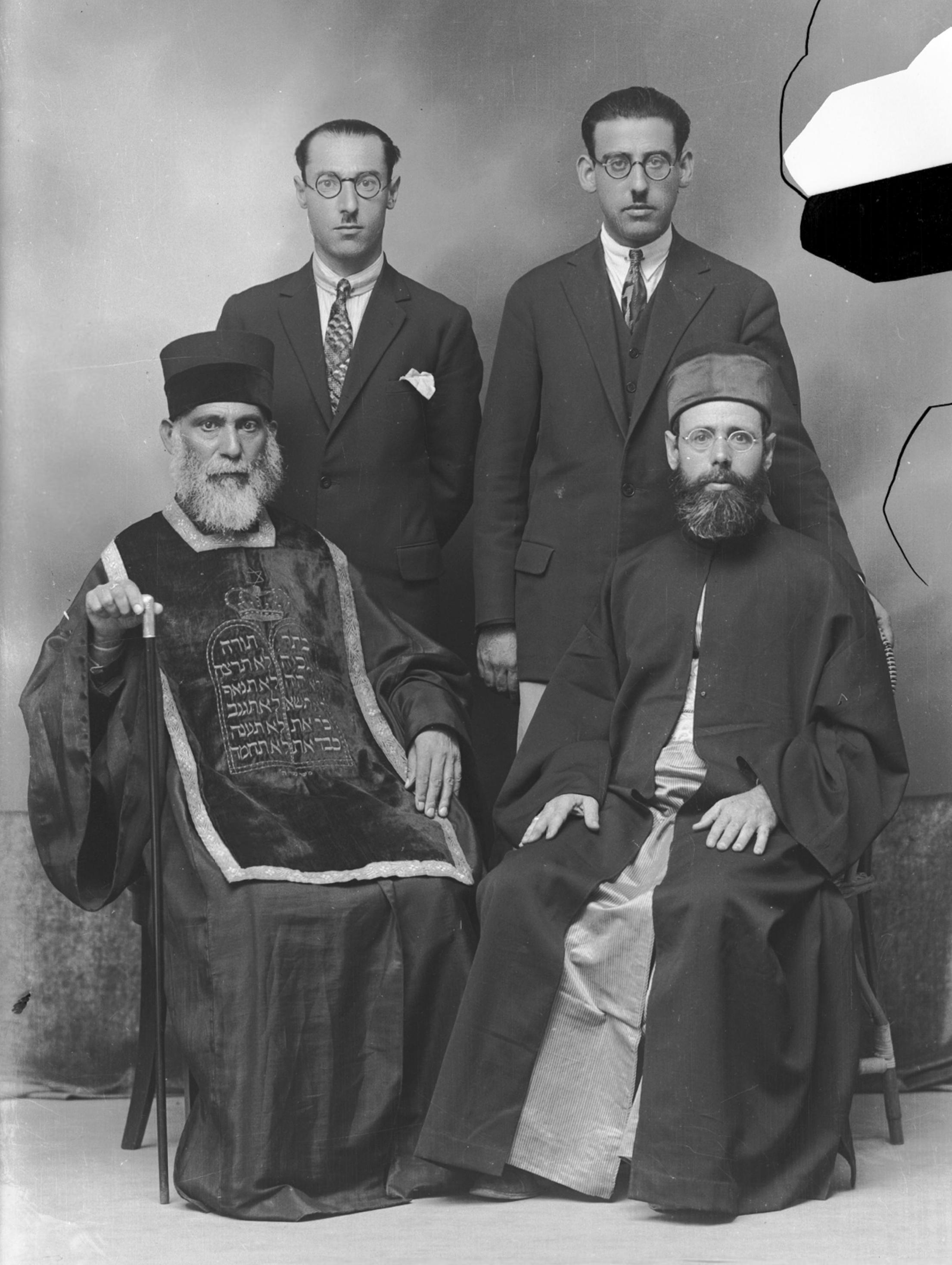
- Members of the Romaniote Greek Jewish community of Volos: Rabbi Moshe Pesach (front left) with his sons (back). Prior to 1940.

Regions with significant populations
- Greece: 4,000
- Cyprus: 3,500?

Languages
- Greek (Yevanic), Hebrew, Ladino

Religion
- Judaism

Related ethnic groups
- Other Jews, Greeks, Constantinopolitan Karaites

The Romaniote Jews or the Romaniotes (Greek: Ῥωμανιῶτες, Rhōmaniôtes; Hebrew: רומניוטים, romanized: Romanyotim) are a Greek-speaking ethnic Jewish community. They are one of the oldest Jewish communities in existence and the oldest Jewish community in Europe. The Romaniotes have been, and even remain historically distinct from the Sephardim that have settled in Ottoman Greece after the expulsion of Jews from Spain and Portugal after 1492.

Their distinct language was Yevanic, a Greek dialect that contained Hebrew along with some Aramaic and Turkish words, but today's Romaniotes speak Modern Greek or the languages of their new home countries. Their name is derived from the endonym Rhōmanía (Ῥωμανία), which refers to the Eastern Roman Empire ("Empire of the Romans", Βασιλεία Ρωμαίων). Large Romaniote communities were located in Thessaloniki, Ioannina, Arta, Preveza, Volos, Chalcis, Thebes, Corinth, Patras, and on the islands of Corfu, Crete, Zakynthos, Lesbos, Chios, Samos, Rhodes, and Cyprus, among others. Additionally, the historically large community of Jews in Bulgaria was Romaniote until the arrival of Sephardim and Ashkenazim fleeing persecution in other parts of Europe.

Most of the Jews of Greece were murdered in the Holocaust after the Axis occupation of Greece during World War II and the deportation of most of the Jews to Nazi concentration camps. After the war, a majority of the survivors emigrated to Mandatory Palestine, Israel, the United States, and Western Europe. Today there are still functioning Romaniote synagogues in Chalkis (which represents the oldest Jewish congregation on European soil), Ioannina, Veria, Athens, New York City, and Israel.

== Name ==
The name Romaniote refers to the Eastern Roman Empire, also known as Byzantium, which included the territory of modern Greece, which this Jewish group inhabited for centuries. Historically, the Empire was commonly referred to as Rhōmanía (Ῥωμανία) and its Christian citizens as Rhōmaîoi, "Romans" (Ῥωμαῖοι), while the Greek-speaking Jews were called Rhōmaniôtes (Ῥωμανιῶτες), essentially meaning inhabitants of Rhōmanía.

== History ==
Jews have lived in Greece since at least the Second Temple era (516 BCE – 70 CE). Recorded Jewish presence in Greece dates back over 2,300 years to the time of Alexander the Great. The earliest reference to a Greek Jew is an inscription dated c. 300–250 BCE, found in Oropos, a small coastal town between Athens and Boeotia, which refers to "Moschos, son of Moschion the Jew", who may have been a slave.

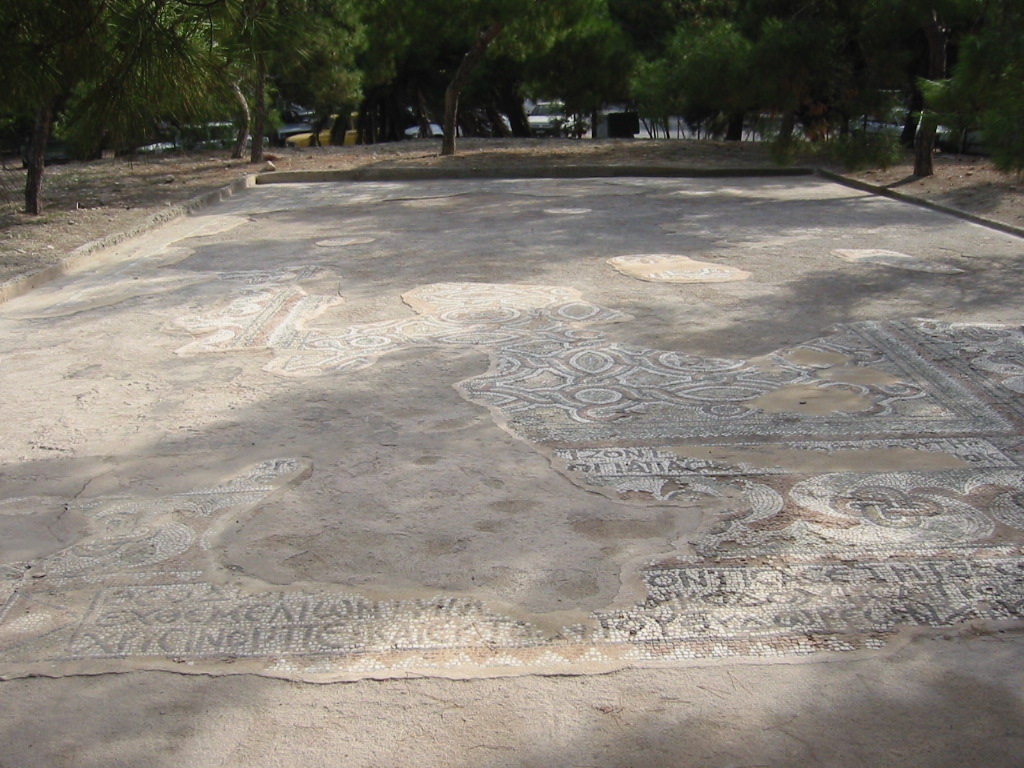
Mosaic floor of a Jewish synagogue in Greece, built 300 AD, Aegina.

A Hellenistic Jewish synagogue was discovered in 1829 near the ancient military port of the capital of the island of Aegina by the Scottish-German historian Ludwig Ross, who was working for the court of King Otto of Greece. The floor was covered for protection and was studied again by Thiersch in 1901, Furtwängler in 1904, E. Sukenik in 1928 and Gabriel Welter in 1932 under the auspices of the National Archaeological Service. Based on the quality of the floor's mosaic, the building is believed to have been constructed in the 4th century CE (300–350 CE) and used until the 7th century. The mosaic floor of the synagogue consists of multi-colored tesserae that create the impression of a carpet, in a geometric pattern of blue, gray, red and white. Two Greek inscriptions were found in front of the synagogue's entrance, on the western side of the building. Today, only part of the synagogue's mosaic floor is extant, and it has been moved from its original location to the courtyard of the island's Archaeological Museum.

In 1977 another ancient synagogue was discovered in Athens, the Synagogue in the Agora of Athens, which may be the synagogue in which Paul the Apostle preached. Inscriptions in the Samaritan and Greek alphabets found in Thessaloniki may originate from Samaritan synagogues. Concurrently the oldest synagogue found in the diaspora is also the oldest Samaritan synagogue: it is the Delos Synagogue, which has an inscription dated between 250 and 175 BCE

The Romaniotes are Greek Jews, distinct from both Ashkenazim and Sephardim, who trace back their history to the times of the Greek-speaking Byzantine Jews and can be subdivided in a wider sense in a Rabbanite community and in the Greco-Karaite community of the Constantinopolitan Karaites which still survives to this day. A Romaniote oral tradition says that the first Jews arrived in Ioannina shortly after the destruction of the Second Temple in Jerusalem in 70 CE. Before the migration of the Ashkenazi and the Sephardi Jews into the Balkans and Eastern Europe, the Jewish culture in these areas consisted primarily of Romaniote Jews.

The Romaniote rites represent those of the Greek-speaking Jews of the Byzantine (or former Byzantine) Empire, ranging from southern Italy (in a narrower sense the Apulian, the Calabrian and the Sicilian Jewish communities) in the west, to much of Turkey in the east, Crete to the south, Crimea (the Krymchaks) to the north and the Jews of the early medieval Balkans and Eastern Europe.

The Sefer Yosippon was written down in the 10th century in Byzantine Southern Italy by the Greek-speaking Jewish community there. Judah Leon ben Moses Mosconi, a Romaniote Jew from Achrida edited and expanded the Sefer Josippon later. This community of Byzantine Jews of southern Italy produced such prominent works like the Sefer Ahimaaz of Ahimaaz ben Paltiel, the Sefer Hachmoni of Shabbethai Donnolo, the Aggadath Bereshit and many Piyyutim. The liturgical writings of these Romaniote Jews, especially the piyyut were eminent for the development of the Ashkenazi Mahzor, as they found their way through Italy to Ashkenaz and are preserved to this day in the most Ashkenazi mahzorim.

The Jews of Southern Italy (where they were living together with their Greek-speaking Christian counterparts) continued to be Greek-speakers until the 15th century. When they were expelled and went to different regions of Greece, especially Corfu, Epirus and Thessaloniki, they could continue to speak their Greek language, even if this language was somewhat different from that of Greece.

In the 12th century, Benjamin of Tudela travelled through the Byzantine Empire and recorded details about communities of Jews in Corfu, Arta, Aphilon, Patras, Corinth, Thebes, Chalkis, Thessaloniki, and Drama. The largest community in Greece at that time was in Thebes, where he found about 2000 Jews. They were engaged mostly in cloth dyeing, weaving, in the production of silverware and silk garments. At the time, they were already known as "Romaniotes".

The first Romaniote synagogue coming under Ottoman rule was Etz ha-Hayyim (Hebrew: עץ החיים, lit. "Tree of Life", frequently a name of Romaniote synagogues) in Prousa in Asia Minor which passed to Ottoman authority in 1324. After the Fall of Constantinople on 29 May 1453, Sultan Mehmed II found the city in a state of disarray. The city had indeed suffered many sieges, a devastating conquest by Catholic Crusaders in 1204 and even a case of the Black Death in 1347, and now had been long cut off from its hinterland, so the city was a shade of its former glory. The event of the conquest of Constantinople was written down by a Romaniote Payetan in a lament hymn, composed with several phrases from the Old Testament in the shibusi style.

As Mehmed wanted to make the city his new capital, he decreed its rebuilding. And in order to revivify Constantinople he ordered that Muslims, Christians and Jews from all over his empire be resettled in the new capital. Within months most of the Empire's Romaniote Jews, from the Balkans and Anatolia, were concentrated in Constantinople, where they made up 10% of the city's population. The forced resettlement, though not intended as an anti-Jewish measure, was perceived as an "expulsion" by the Jews. Nevertheless, the Romaniotes would remain the most influential Jewish community in the Empire for decades to come, determining the Chief Rabbis of the towns and the Hakham Bashi of the Ottoman Empire until their leading position was lost to a wave of new Jewish arrivals. These events initiated the first great numerical decline of the Romaniote community.

The number of Jews was soon bolstered by small groups of Ashkenazi Jews that immigrated to the Ottoman Empire between 1421 and 1453. Waves of Sephardi Jews were expelled from Spain in 1492; many settled in Ottoman-ruled Greece. They spoke a separate language, Ladino. Thessaloniki had one of the largest (mostly Sephardi) Jewish communities in the world and a solid rabbinical tradition. On the island of Crete, the Jews historically played an important part in the transport trade. In the centuries following 1492 most of the Romaniote communities were assimilated by the more numerous Sephardim.

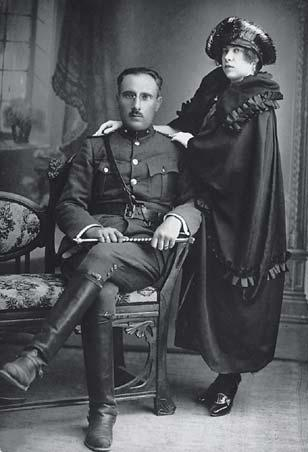
Colonel Mordechai Frizis (1893–1940) from the ancient Romaniote Greek Jewish community of Chalkis with his wife Victoria.

The status of Jewry in the Ottoman Empire often hinged on the whims of the sultan. Murad III for example ordered that the attitude of all non-Muslims should be one of "humility and abjection" and should not "live near Mosques or in tall buildings" or own slaves.

200 Jews, mostly Romaniotes, took part in the Greco-Turkish War (1897) on the side of Greece. After the liberation of Ioannina on February 21, 1913, the Rabbi and the Romaniote community of Ioannina welcomed at the New Synagogue of Ioannina the liberator of the city, Crown Prince Constantine, the future King of the Hellenes Constantine I.

Romaniote Jews, due to their cultural and linguistic ties with Greek Christians and their subordinate status under Ottoman rule, often sympathized with Greek nationalist movements. In contrast, other Jews (e.g. Sephardis and Donmeh) of the Ottoman Empire were generally pro-Ottoman, as they benefited from Ottoman policies and were described as having a growing sense of Turkish patriotism.

At the beginning of the 20th century, the Romaniote community of Ioannina numbered about 4,000 people, mostly lower-class tradesmen and craftsmen. Their numbers dwindled after that due to economic emigration; after the Holocaust and in the wake of World War II, there were approximately 1,950 Romaniotes left in Ioannina. Centered around the old fortified part of the city (or Kastro), where the community had been living for centuries, they maintained two synagogues, one of which, the Kehila Kedosha Yashan Synagogue still remains today.

A strong Romaniote community was present in Corfu until the late 19th century, when a pogrom sparked by blood libel charges forced most of the Jewish community to leave the island.

== Nusach and Minhag ==
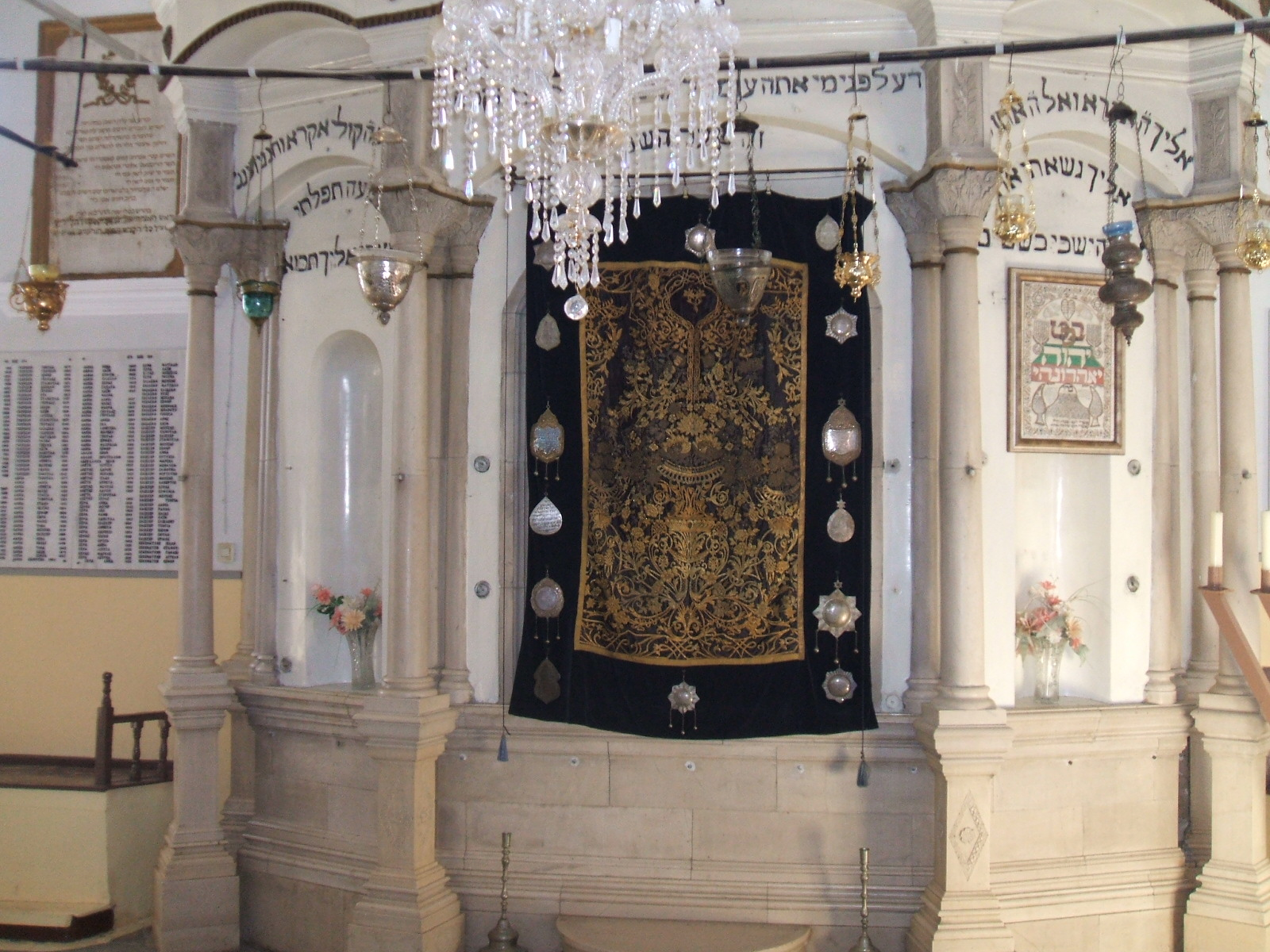
View on the Torah Ark of the Kehila Kedosha Yashan Synagogue of Ioannina with the typical Romaniote Shadayot (Votive offerings similar to the Byzantine Christian tradition) hanging on the Parochet and a Romaniote "Aleph" on the right side (a circumcision certificate with Berachot (mostly the Shiviti) and ancestral details).

The Romaniote prayer rite (Nusach) as seen in the original Mahzor Romania and the Romaniote commentaries (Minhag) on Jewish exegesis and Jewish law, vary from those of the Ashkenazi, Sephardic and Mizrachi Jews, and are closer to those of the Italian Jews: some of these are thought to have been based on the Jerusalem Talmud instead of the Babylonian Talmud (see Eretz-Yisrael minhag). This Minhag was once widespread in Southern Italy, the Balkans, Greece, Anatolia and the Crimea.

The Romaniotes spoke Judaeo-Greek for a long time, and many of them still use the Greek language today. Tobiah ben Eliezer (טוביה בר אליעזר), a Greek-speaking Talmudist and poet of the 11th century, worked and lived in the city of Kastoria. He is the author of the Lekach Tov, a midrashic commentary on the Pentateuch and the Five Megillot and also of some poems. Romaniote scholars translated the Tanakh into Greek. A polyglot edition of the Bible published in Constantinople in 1547 has the Hebrew text in the middle of the page, with a Ladino (Judaeo-Spanish) translation on one side, a Yevanic translation on the other and the Judaeo-Aramaic Targum at the bottom of the page.

In the early Romaniote rite the Torah was subdivided in Sedarim while the whole Torah was read in the Palestinian way of the Triennial cycle. The order for reading the Haftarah followed a specific custom, particular to the Romaniote rite. The Romaniote Torah scrolls are housed in tikim ('tik', from Greek thḗkē, θήκη "container"), from which they are never completely taken out. Among the Romaniote Jews, tradition dictates, that the most holy Sefer Torah, the Law of Moses, be read with the scroll standing upright in its tik; it is considered improper to lay it flat.

The siddur (prayer book) for the Romaniote rite was known as the Mahzor Romania. The Romaniote Jews have their own form of wedding blessing. Upon the betrothal, seven blessings are bestowed on the bride and groom to be, while wedding wreaths are covering the heads of the groom and the bride and are interchanged on their heads. At the end of a full year, the Ketubah was read at the wedding ceremony proper. This is different in that other Jews bless the bride and groom at the time of the actual wedding. In addition, there are ritual differences in the building of the Synagogue and in the building and the use of the mikve. It is a Romaniote tradition to write on the Ketubah the year since creation of the world and the year since the destruction of the Temple.

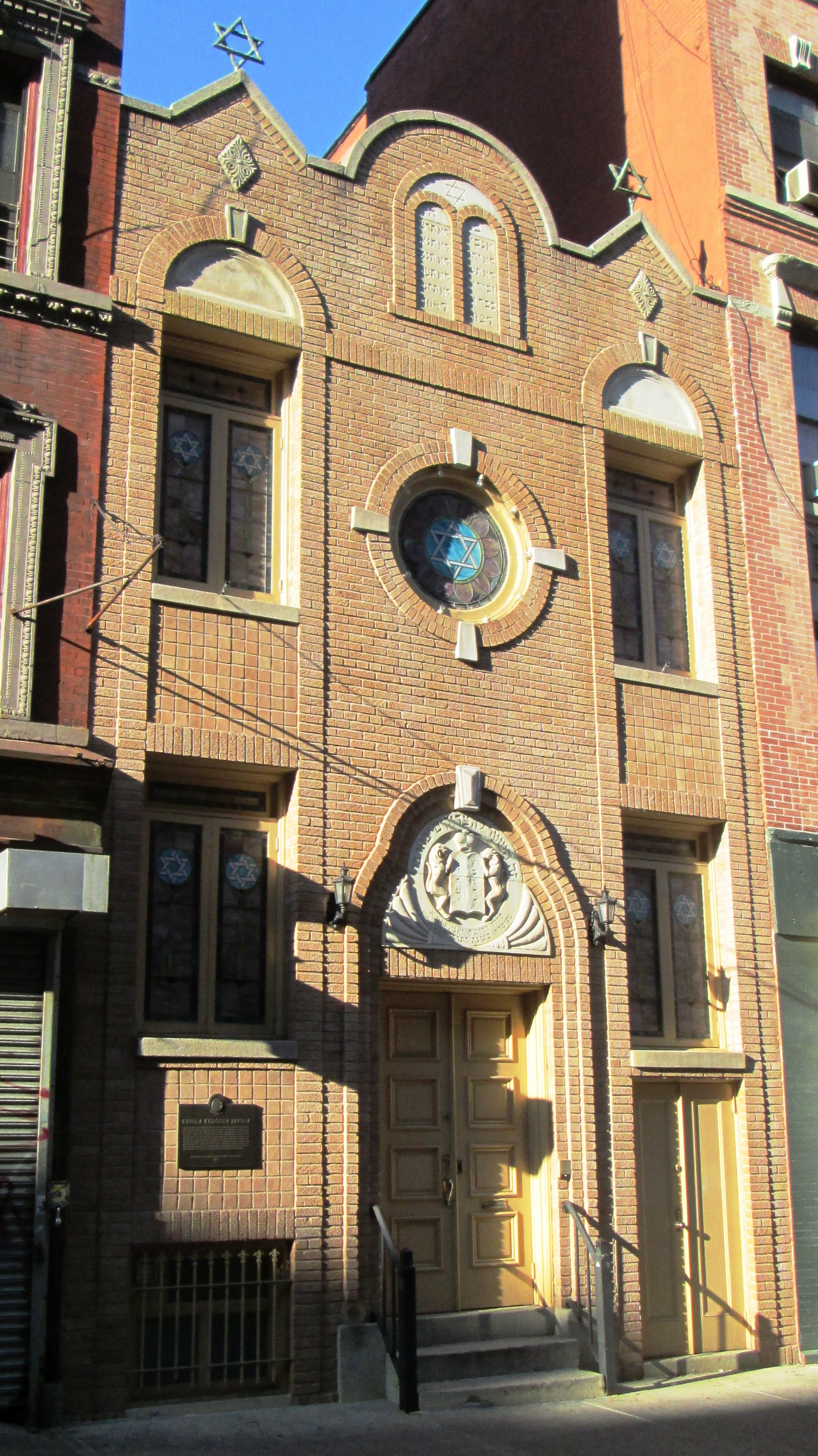
Kehila Kedosha Janina, New York

The Romaniotes traditionally gave to a child a mystical document known as an "aleph". This hand-painted "birth and circumcision certificate" was created by a family member and then handed down. The aleph was written in mystical codes for the purpose of warding off the wiles of Lillith, Adam's first wife.

The Romaniotes are well known for their hymns in Judaeo-Greek and Hebrew, for their special way of cantillation, based on the Byzantine melos and for their Jewish-Greek folksongs, based on regional melodies. Jewish immigrants from Sicily brought to Ioannina the celebration of the Sicilian Purim Katan. The Jews of Ioannina call this holiday Pourimopoulo. They read the special "Megillah for the Purim Katan of Syracuse" and sing corresponding songs and hymns for this festivity.

The Mahzor of the Romaniote Kaffa Rite from the year 1735 gives the order to read the Megillat Antiochos in the Mincha of Shabbat Hanukkah. In the second half of the 19th century, the Romaniote community of Greece made an effort to preserve the Romaniote liturgical heritage of Ioannina and Arta, by printing various liturgical texts in the Hebrew printing presses of Salonika. Today, the Romaniote Liturgy follows (with slight differences) the mainstream Sephardic usage, while the Romaniotes and the Jews of Corfu have preserved their old and own Judaeo-Greek and Hebrew piyyutim, their own way of cantillation and their special customs. A custom, which is still followed in the Etz Hayyim Synagogue of Crete, is to read on Yom Kippur the Book of Jonah in Judaeo-Greek. Another custom was to chant the Song of Songs verse by verse by alternating from Hebrew to its paraphrasing Targum Jonathan translation after the morning service on the last two days of Pessach.

Romaniote Synagogues have their own layout: the bimah (where the Torah scrolls are read out during services) is on a raised dais on the western wall, the Aron haKodesh (where the Torah scrolls are kept) is on the eastern wall and in the middle there is a wide interior aisle. Votive offerings made of silver as stars or tablets called shadayot were a thankful gift to the Synagogue of congregants who have received help, healing or salvation by God. The Romaniote term for the Passover ceremony (Seder) is חובה (Hova), which means obligation. In 2004 the Jewish Museum of Greece published a Romaniote rite Pesach-Seder CD (The Ioannina Haggadah). In the years 2017 and 2018 the Romaniote rite Haggadah and the Romaniote rite prayer book (siddur) have been published in a series, containing also Romaniote poetry, the haftarot according to the Romaniote custom and other texts. A Romaniote rite based reform siddur in Greek and Hebrew has also been published in 2018.

== Language and literature ==
The intellectual pursuits of Romaniote Jews reflected in their history their geographical location within the Jewish and gentile world. Direct heir to Palestinian Jewish traditions on the one hand, they were also heir to the teachings of the Greco-Roman world. The Byzantine Jewish/Romaniote literature shows a rich blend of Hellenistic Jewish and Palestinian rabbinic traditions. Romaniote Jewry, throughout its history, expended great effort on religious poetry, which reached its peak during the period 1350–1550. The writing of piyyutim was clearly held as its own genre. In the twelfth century Hillel ben Eliakim wrote down his exegetical commentary, Sifre ve Sifra. Shemarya HaIkriti who moved after 1328 to Negroponte prepared his supercommentary to Ibn Ezra and, circa 1346–47 wrote his Sefer Amasyahu, a handbook of biblical apologetics. In tune with the intellectual currents among Romaniotes, Shemarya was trained in philosophy and was able to translate directly from Greek to Hebrew. The Sefer Yosippon was written by the Byzantine Jews of Southern Italy. R. Elnatan ben Moses Kalkes (from Kilkis) wrote a lengthy kabbalistic treatise entitled Eben Saphir. Mordecai Komatiano has left a legacy of some fifteen works on astronomy, grammar (dikduk), biblical commentaries and piyyutim; some of the later have even been included in the Karaite prayerbook. Several manuscripts containing mystical works have survived. The question of an independent Romaniote mystical tradition, probably deriving directly from Palestinian antecedents, is proved. An abridgement of Aristotle's Logic by Yoseph HaYevani was made available to those Jews (Sephardi immigrants) who were less proficient in Greek. The Byzantine Karaites showed a knowledge of Greek philosophical terminology. Rabbinic authors spiced their comments with Greek phrases. The familiarity of Romaniote Jewry with the Greek language is well documented. Biblical translations, piyyutim, folksongs, Ketubbot, liturgical instructions, glossaries, mystical texts and the use of Greek words in commentaries in Judaeo-Greek are known.

=== Judaeo-Greek ===
After World War II, the Judaeo-Greek language of Ioannina underwent a process of koinezation. The only phonetic differences to Standard Modern Greek, which could be noted shortly after the war have been [x] > [s] before front vowels, unusual intonation patterns and some peculiar lexical items, mostly of Hebrew-Aramaic provenance. Lexemes, such as Hebrew-Aramaic loans, were easily identified as "ours" and "theirs," i.e., Sephardic vs. Romaniote. While composing texts on their religion, the Greek Jews followed the literary standards of Greek syntax and morphology, using a number of Hebrew-Aramaic loanwords. The Hebrew-Aramaic component would be written down in ways reflecting traditional Romaniote pronunciation, for example Shalom, was spelled and written as Salom (Σαλώμ).

Krivoruchko states in her work Judeo-Greek in the era of globalization that Judaeo-Greek has always been interchangeable with the spoken variety of Greek, which was used by the surrounding Christian community, but had a few special features in its various geographical and chronological types (for example the Judaeo-Greek of Crete [† 1945] and that of Constantinople). Besides the few phonetic differences between Judaeo-Greek and Standard Modern Greek the most common difference has been the use of Hebrew and Aramaic loanwords in Judaeo-Greek. Considerable are also the phonetic differences between Romaniote Hebrew (look downwards on paragraph Romaniote Hebrew) and Sephardic Hebrew, for example Sephardic Shavuot was spelled as Savóth (Σαβώθ) in Judaeo-Greek.

Second and third generation Romaniote immigrants in New York city have good knowledge of Greek. In the beginning of the 21st century 90% asserted that they understand Greek while 40% could speak Greek comfortably. Over a third could read Greek satisfactorily. The number of persons fluent in the Greek Language is much lower in the group of the Greek Sephardim outside of Greece.

=== Romaniote Hebrew ===
The Romaniote pronunciation of the Hebrew language is very close in its major features to the common Modern Hebrew pronunciation. The vowel-system is a simple five-vowel system without either quantitative or qualitative distinctions. Typical was the absence of distinction between: the Semitic velarized and non-velarized stops [t] and [ṭ], spelled [ת/ט], and [k/q], spelled [כ/ק]. The distinction between [s] and [ṣ] (ס/צ) is maintained as [s] vs. [ts], i. e., a voiceless alveolar fricative against a voiceless alveolar affricate, a pronunciation common to Byzantine and Ashkenazic pronunciation; "strong" and "weak" [t], spelled [תּ/ת] (t/θ) preserved in Ashkenazic pronunciation as [t]/[s]; velar and pharyngeal [ħ] and [χ], spelled [ח/כ], both of which are pronounced [χ], as in Ashkenazic; the glottal and pharyngeal stops [ʔ] and [ʕ], spelled [ע/א], both of which are weakened to the point of almost total absence in syllable-initial and syllable-final position, another characteristic shared with the Ashkenazic tradition. שׁ was pronounced as [s] in the Romaniote tradition of Hebrew pronunciation. The loss of spirantization rule for postvocalic, non-geminated Old Hebrew b, d, g, p, t, k homorganic fricatives (this rule is not found now in either the Balkan or the North African Sephardic diaspora) may have been due Romaniote practice (it is observed partly in Yiddish Hebraisms and in the Ashkenazic pronunciation of monolingual Hebrew texts). The [ז] was pronounced as [d͡z] and the [ד] as [ð] which are typical sounds of the Standard Modern Greek.

The Hebrew Paleography resp. the Hebrew Epigraphy recognises a specific "Byzantine" or "Romaniote" Handwriting system of the Hebrew alphabet, which has been developed among the Soferim of the Greek-speaking lands. In many cases manuscripts of Romaniote origin from the Byzantine Empire, or from later times can be recognised as "Romaniote", only with the science of Paleography, if they do not contain a Colophon (publishing) or other characteristics of identification.

== Holocaust and afterwards ==
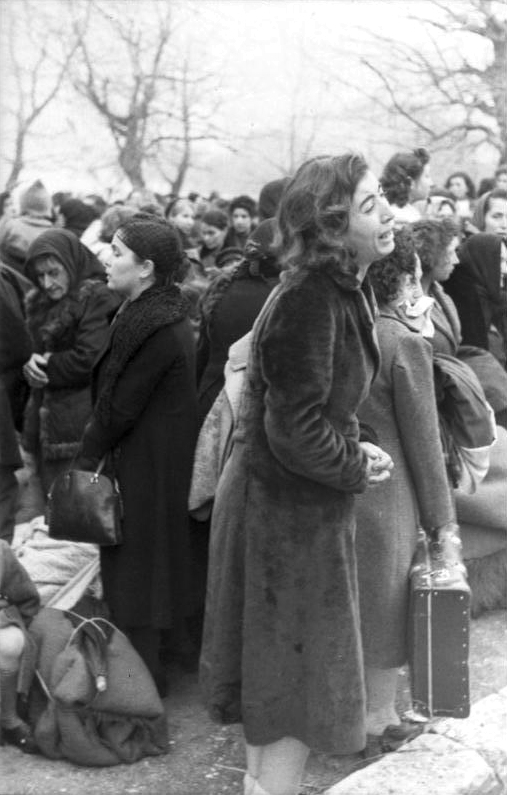
A woman weeps during the deportation of the Jews of Ioannina on March 25, 1944. The majority of the Jews deported were murdered on or shortly after April 11, 1944, when their train reached Auschwitz-Birkenau.

During World War II, when Greece was occupied by Nazi Germany, 86% of the Greek Jews, especially those in the areas occupied by Nazi Germany and Bulgaria, were murdered. Some Greeks collaborated with the deportations or expropriated Jewish property; a few, encouraged by the Greek Orthodox Church, sheltered Jews. Roughly 49,000 Jews—Romaniotes and Sephardim—were deported from Thessaloniki alone and murdered. Many Greek Jews were forced to pay their own tickets to the death camps. Almost all Romaniote Jews of the island of Crete, together with some resistance fighters, died on the ship Tanaḯs when it was torpedoed by the British submarine HMS Vivid on 9 June 1944.

During the German occupation, the Romaniotes' ability to speak Greek enabled them to hide better from German deportations than Sephardi Jews who spoke Ladino.

The majority of Romaniotes who survived the Holocaust left for Israel or the United States at the end of the war. The creation of the state of Israel in 1948, combined with the violence and anarchy of the Greek Civil War (1946–1949), led to an immigration of a number of Romaniotes to Israel. The great earthquake on the island of Zakynthos in 1953 led the last remaining Romaniote Jews to leave the island towards Athens. The vast majority of Romaniotes have relocated to Israel and the United States, with the world's largest community located in New York.

== Present day ==
Today approximately 4,500 to 6,000 Jews remain in Greece. Of these, only a small number are Romaniotes, who live mainly in Thessaloniki, Ioannina, Chalkis and Athens. About 3,500 Jews now live in Athens, while another 1,000 live in Thessaloniki. A mixed community of Romaniote and Apulian Jews still lives on the Island of Corfu.

=== Greece ===
==== Athens ====
The Ioanniotiki Synagogue, situated above the Jewish Community of Athens offices at #8 Melidoni St., is the only Romaniote synagogue in Athens. Built in 1906, it now has services only during the High Holy Days, but can be opened for visitors upon request through the Jewish Community office.

The Jewish identity of another building found in the excavations of the ancient Agora in Athens, is questionable. It is believed that the Metroon, discovered in 1930 at the foot of the hill Hephaestion (Thesion) was used as a synagogue during its construction at the end of the 4th century CE (396–400). This view was expressed by the archaeologist H. Thompson, from the American School of Classical Studies in Athens, but was not developed into a complete theory. The Jewish identity of the Metroon was based on a small piece of marble found near the Metroon that had two Jewish symbols carved on one side, and the resemblance of the building to the synagogue of Sardis in Asia Minor.

==== Chalkis ====
The Romaniote Jewish Community of Chalkis is not the oldest one in Greece, but it is the only one in Europe that has been living in the same city for 2,500 years without interruption and the community is still active in the city's life. The community has a synagogue and a cemetery with important and old inscriptions. The Synagogue is on Kotsou Street. It is unknown when the first synagogue in Chalkis was constructed. In 1854, during the Holy Week a great fire destroyed the synagogue. In 1855 it was re-constructed in the same size with funds offered by Sophie de Marbois-Lebrun, Duchess of Plaisance. The Synagogue opens every Friday evening and occasionally on Shabbat morning.

==== Ioannina ====
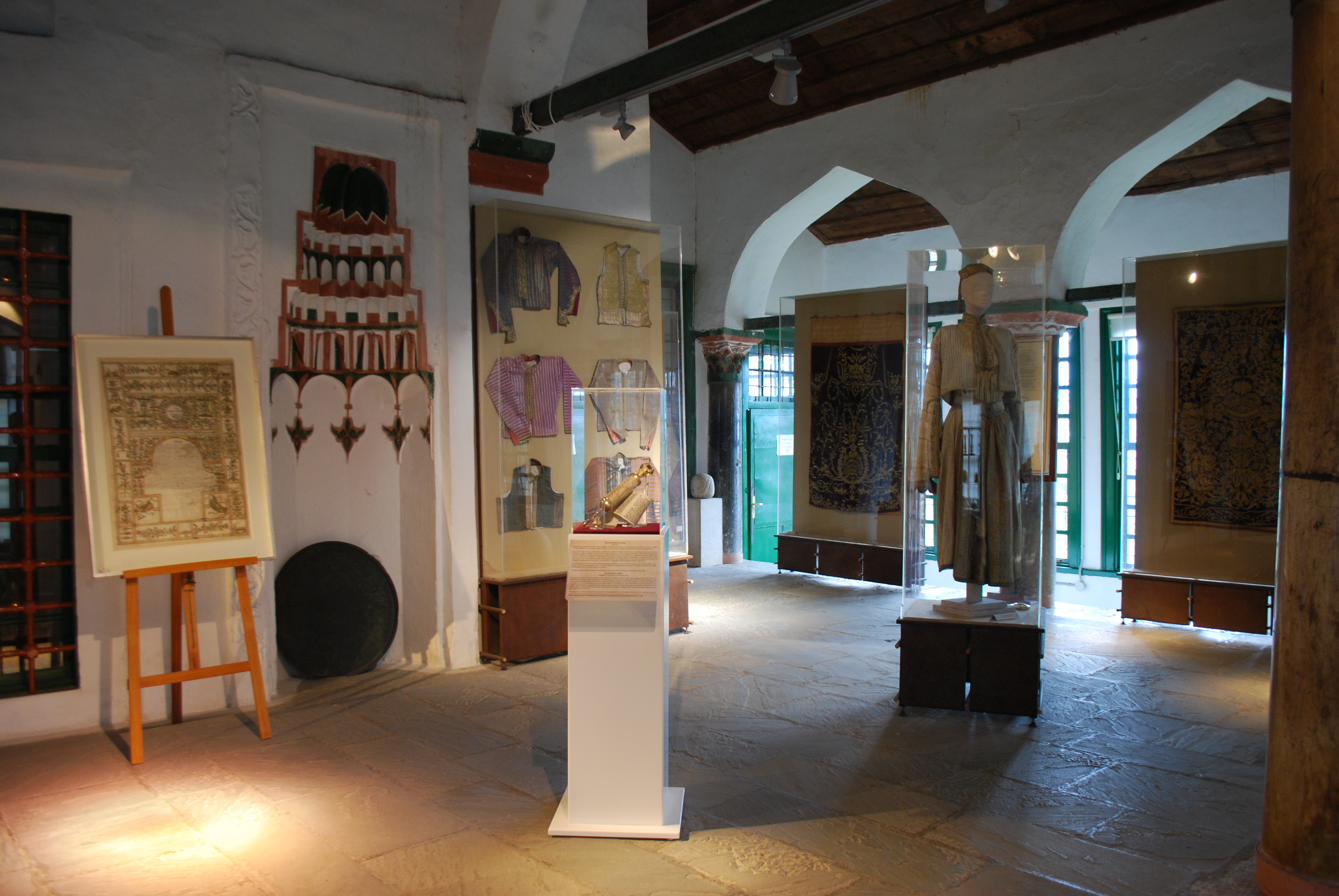
Municipal Ethnographic Museum of Ioannina with Romaniote items

In Ioannina, the Romaniote community has dwindled to 50 mostly elderly people. The Kehila Kedosha Yashan Synagogue there is open primarily on the High Holidays, or in the case of the visit of a chazzan, or is opened for visitors on request. Immigrant Romaniotes return every summer to the old synagogue. After a long time a Bar Mitzvah (the Jewish ritual for celebrating the coming of age of a child) was held in the synagogue in 2000, and was an exceptional event for the community.

The synagogue is located in the old fortified part of the city known as Kastro, at 16 Ioustinianou street. Its name means "the Old Synagogue". It was constructed in 1829, most probably over the ruins of an older synagogue. Its architecture is typical of the Ottoman era, a large building made of stone. The interior of the synagogue is laid out in the Romaniote way: the Bimah (where the Torah scrolls are read out during services) is on a raised dais on the western wall, the Aron haKodesh (where the Torah scrolls are kept) is on the eastern wall and in the middle there is a wide interior aisle. The names of the Ioanniote Jews who were killed in the Holocaust are engraved in stone on the walls of the synagogue. The Bet Chaim cemetery in Ioannina belongs to the community.

==== Volos ====
In the community of Volos many of the Romaniote pre-Sephardic traditions prevail. The community consists of Romaniotes as well as Sephardim (particularly from Larissa) and Corfiots. Ancient historic texts mention that Jews lived in the region of Magnesia, Thessaly and in particular in neighbouring Almyros as early as the 1st century AD. Historians argue that Jews have been living in ancient Demetrias since the 2nd century AD. Ancient Jewish tombstones dating back to 325–641 AD, were also discovered in the neighbouring city of Phthiotic Thebes. Moshe Pesach was Rabbi of Volos who saved Greek Jews during the Holocaust and helped to consolidate the community of Volos after World War II.

=== Israel ===
Most Romaniotes in Israel live in Tel Aviv. There are two Romaniote synagogues in Israel: the Zakynthos Synagogue in Tel Aviv, and the Beit Avraham Ve'ohel Sarah liKehilat Ioanina in Nachlaot, Jerusalem. The former Romaniote Yanina Synagogue in the Christian Quarter, Jerusalem is no longer in use. In Beit Avraham Ve'ohel Sarah liKehilat Ioanina in Jerusalem, the prayers today follow the Sephardic rite, but they preserve a few piyyutim from the Romaniote rite.

=== United States ===
Only one Romaniote synagogue (from originally several Romaniote Synagogues in New York) is in operation in the entire Western Hemisphere: Kehila Kedosha Janina, at 280 Broome Street, on the Lower East Side of Manhattan, where it is used by the Romaniote emigrant community. It maintains a mailing list of 3,000 Romaniote families, most of them living in the tri-state area. It is open for services every Saturday morning as well as all major Jewish holidays. The synagogue also houses a museum devoted to Greek Jewry and offers guided tours to visitors on Sundays. Like the community in Jerusalem, the prayers today follow the Sephardic rite, but they preserve a few piyyutim from the Romaniote rite.

== Genetics ==
DNA research and genealogical works based on the Romaniote communities of Ioannina and Zakynthos are in progress. Nearly 4/5th of the autosomal DNA of Ashkenazi Jews is related to that of Romaniote Jews. Romaniote Jewish men have been found to belong to various branches of Y-chromosomal haplogroups E1b1b1, G, J, Q, R1a, and R1b. In 2024, a team of researchers announced that a modern Romaniote Jewish man from Greece belongs to "a previously undiscovered" branch of the Y-chromosomal haplogroup J-P58 found to be "dating straight back 7,000 years to the Neolithic era." Romaniote Jewish mitochondrial DNA haplogroups include HV1b2, U5b, and U6a3.

== Notable Romaniotes ==
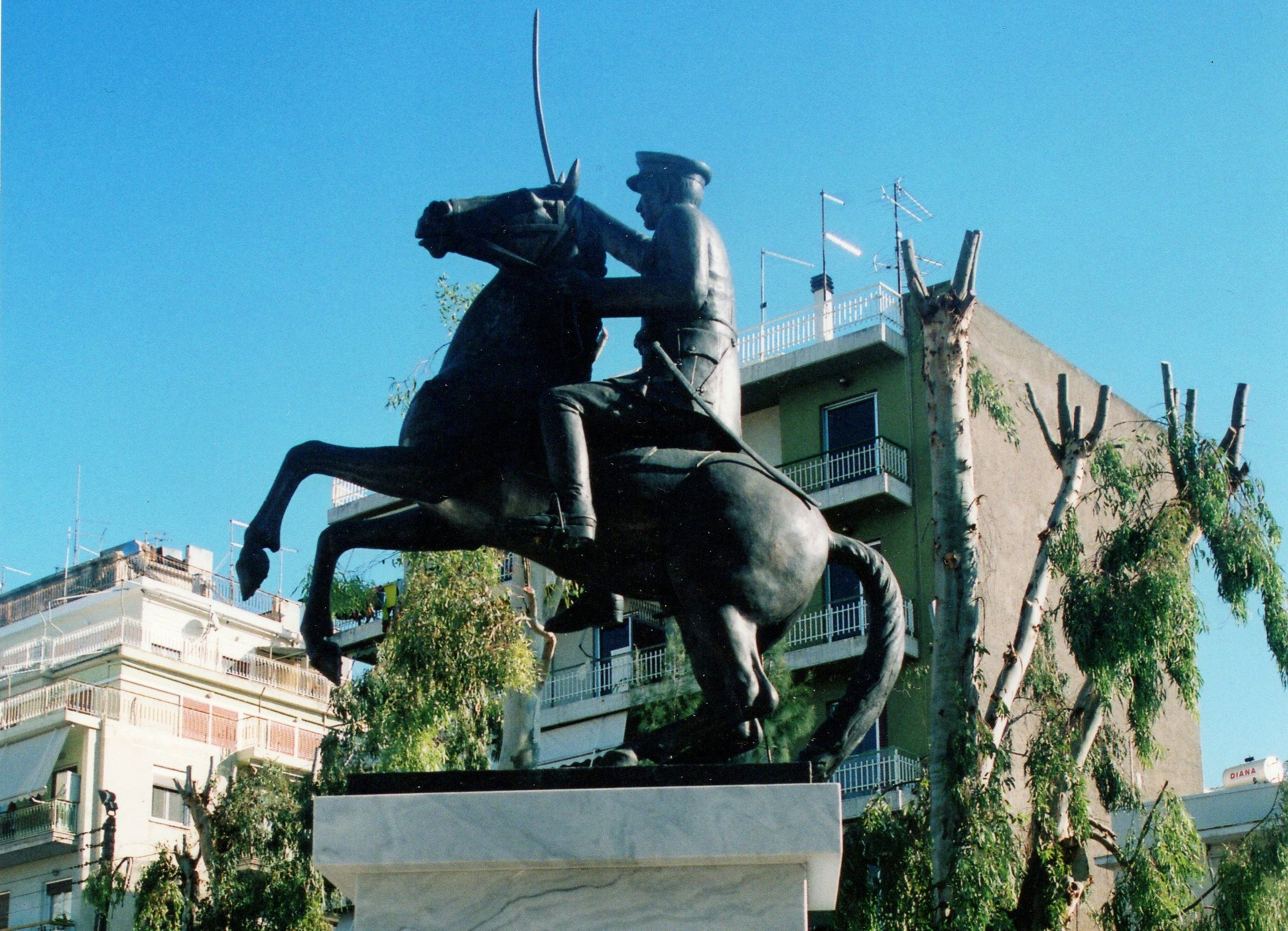
Statue of Mordechai Frizis in Chalkida

Byzantine times to the Ottoman Empire

- Asaph ben Berechiah
- Moses Capsali
- Mordecai Comtino
- Moses of Crete, a Jewish messiah claimant of the 5th century C.E.
- Shabbethai Donnolo
- Tobiah ben Eliezer
- Hillel ben Eliakim
- Elia del Medigo
- Joseph Solomon Delmedigo
- Ahimaaz ben Paltiel
- Eleazar ben Killir
- Elijah Mizrachi, Hakham Bashi of the Ottoman Empire
- Judah Leon ben Moses Mosconi
- Leo II Mung Archbishop of Ohrid
- Shemariah of Negropont
- Zerachiah HaYavani
- Sabbatai Zevi, a Jewish messiah claimant of the 17th century C.E.

Greek-speaking Karaites of Constantinople

- Caleb Afendopolo
- Elijah Bashyazi
- Aaron ben Joseph of Constantinople
- Aaron ben Elijah
- Judah Hadassi

Modern times

- Abraham Cohen of Zante, a Jewish physician, rabbi, religious philosopher and poet on Zakynthos
- Abraham Benrubi, American actor
- Mordechai Frizis, officer of the Greek Army during the Greco-Italian War
- Moshe Pesach, Rabbi and Recipient of the Order of the Phoenix (Greece), which was given to him by George II of Greece King of the Hellenes
- Rae Dalven, a prominent Romaniotissa, particularly noted for her translation of modern Greek poetry
- Amalia Bakas, a singer of Greek traditional and rembetiko songs with a successful career in the United States.
- Mathias Naphtali, Former Assistant District Attorney of Brooklyn, and Liberal Party candidate for New York State Senate in 1950
- Anna Kohen, dentist and writer, born in Albania
- Albert Cohen, francophone Swiss writer
- Jack H. Jacobs, Vietnam War veteran. Medal of Honor recipient
- Albert Levis, a psychiatrist, philosopher and innkeeper of the Wilburton Inn in Manchester, Vermont
- Michael Matsas, an author and holocaust survivor
- Minos Matsas, of the Matsas family from Ioannina, music producer (see Minos EMI)
- Savas Matsas, is a Greek intellectual, author and leader of the Workers Revolutionary Party (Greece)
- Joshua Matza, is a former Israeli Minister of Health and former president and CEO of State of Israel Bonds
- Katherine, Crown Princess of Yugoslavia, a descendant of the Romaniote branches Batis and Dostis
- Leon Batis, a holocaust survivor and hero
- Alexander Levis, university professor of electrical, computer, and systems engineering at George Mason University and former chief scientist of the U.S. Air Force
- Alberto Nahmias, legendary Greek football player who played for Iraklis Thessaloniki club and was the first ever official goalscorer for the Greece national football team
- Avram Pengas, a musician of traditional and popular Greek music in the United States
- Albert Sabbas, a renowned nuclear physicist
- Georges Moustaki, Egyptian-Greek-French singer-songwriter
- Moisis Elisaf, mayor of Ioannina (2019–2023)
- Silvio Santos, Brazilian entrepreneur, media tycoon and television host
- Kenneth Alvin Solomon (1947–), American nuclear and forensic scientist

== See also ==
- Greek citron
- Hellenistic Judaism
- History of the Jews in the Byzantine Empire
- History of the Jews in Cyprus
- History of the Jews in Greece
- History of the Jews in the Ottoman Empire
- History of the Jews in Turkey
- Jewish Koine Greek
- Thessaloniki and Ioannina, the two cities in Greece with the most prominent Jewish communities
