= Romaniote =

Romaniote may refer to:

- Romaniote Jews, a Greek-speaking ethnic Jewish community
- Yevanic, or Romaniote, a Greek dialect formerly used by the Romaniotes
