= Hellenistic Judaism =

Form of Judaism in classical antiquity

Hellenistic Judaism was a form of Judaism in classical antiquity (8th-5th centuries BCE) that combined Jewish religious tradition with elements of Hellenistic culture and religion. Until the fall of the Roman Empire and the early Muslim conquests of the eastern Mediterranean, the main centers of Hellenistic Judaism were Antioch in Turkey and Alexandria in Egypt, the two main Greek urban settlements of the Middle East and North Africa, both founded in the end of the 4th century BCE in the wake of the conquests of Alexander the Great. Hellenistic Judaism also existed in Jerusalem during the Second Temple Period (c. 538 BCE - 70 CE), where there was a conflict between Hellenizers and traditionalists.

The major literary product of the contact between Second Temple Judaism and Hellenistic culture is the Septuagint translation of the Hebrew Bible from Biblical Hebrew and Biblical Aramaic to Koine Greek, specifically, Jewish Koine Greek. Mentionable are also the philosophic and ethical treatises of Philo and the historiographical works of the other Hellenistic Jewish authors.

The decline of Hellenistic Judaism began in the 2nd century, and the precise causes are not fully understood. Following the Roman suppression of the Diaspora Revolt (115–117 CE), Jewish populations in Egypt, including the large and influential community in Alexandria, as well as those in Cyrenaica and Cyprus, were eradicated. Jewish presence in these regions was not re-established until centuries later, without regaining their former influence. Over time, much of the Greek-speaking diaspora was incorporated into the rabbinic framework by the rabbis. Additionally, it is possible that some members of Hellenistic Jewry were marginalized, absorbed, or gradually became part of the Koine-speaking core of early Christianity centered on Antioch and its traditions, such as the Melkite Greek Catholic Church and the Greek Orthodox Patriarchate of Antioch.

== Background ==
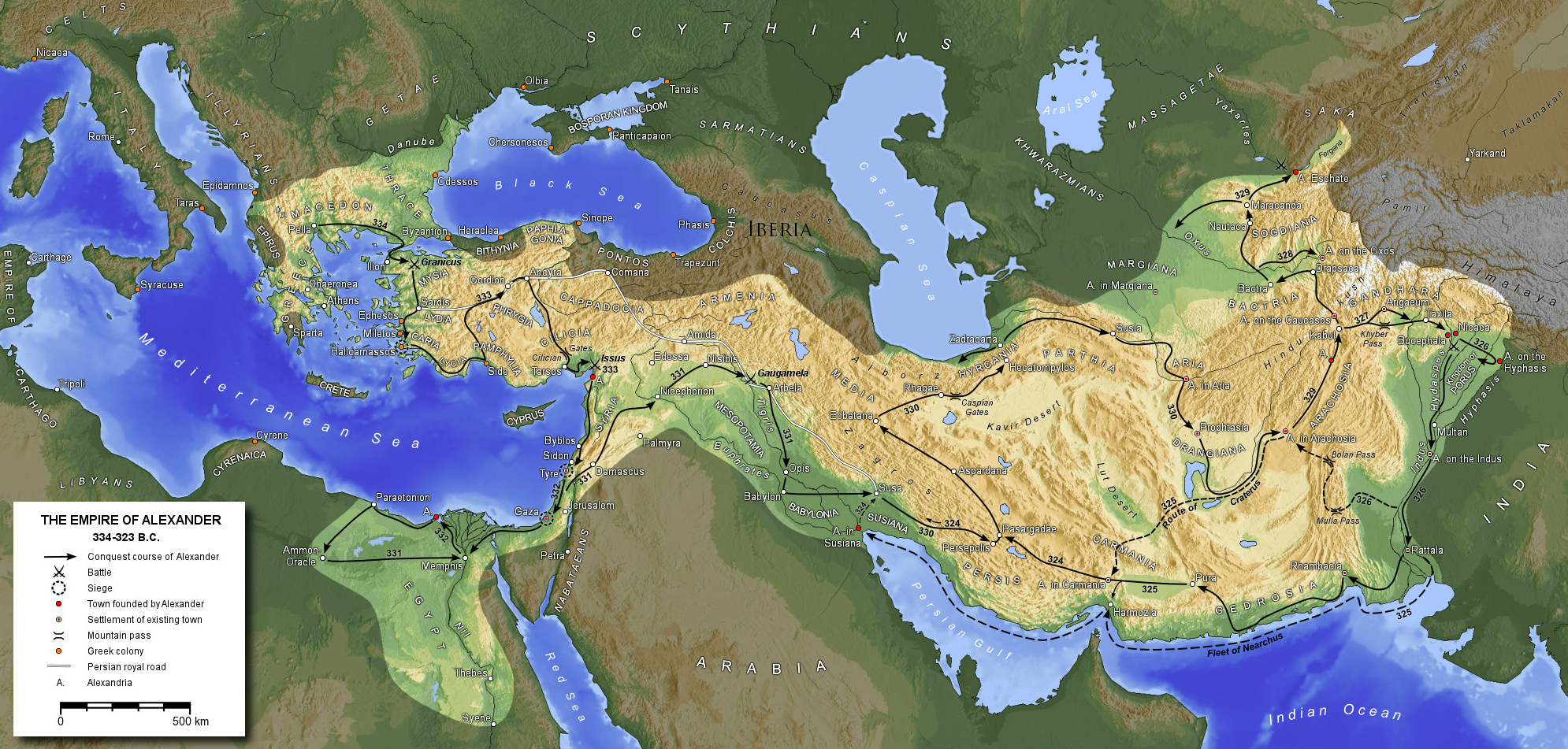
Map of Alexander's empire, extending east and south of ancient Macedonia

The conquests of Alexander the Great in the late 4th century BCE spread Greek culture and colonization—a process of cultural change called Hellenization—over non-Greek lands including the Levant. This gave rise to the Hellenistic period, which sought to create a common or universal culture in the Alexandrian empire based on that of fifth-century Athens, along with a fusion of Near Eastern cultures. The period is characterized by a new wave of Greek colonization which established Greek cities and kingdoms in Asia and Africa, the most famous being Alexandria in Egypt. New cities were established composed of colonists from different parts of the Greek world and not from a specific metropolis ("mother city") as before.

The spread of Hellenism caused a blending of the local indigenous culture and the culture of the conquerors. Jewish life in both Judea and the diaspora was influenced by the culture and language of Hellenism. Local indigenous elites frequently played a significant role in embracing and promoting Hellenism, leading to its impact on all regional cultures, including the Jewish culture. In Judea, Hellenism gradually took hold, despite the relatively small number of foreign settlers.

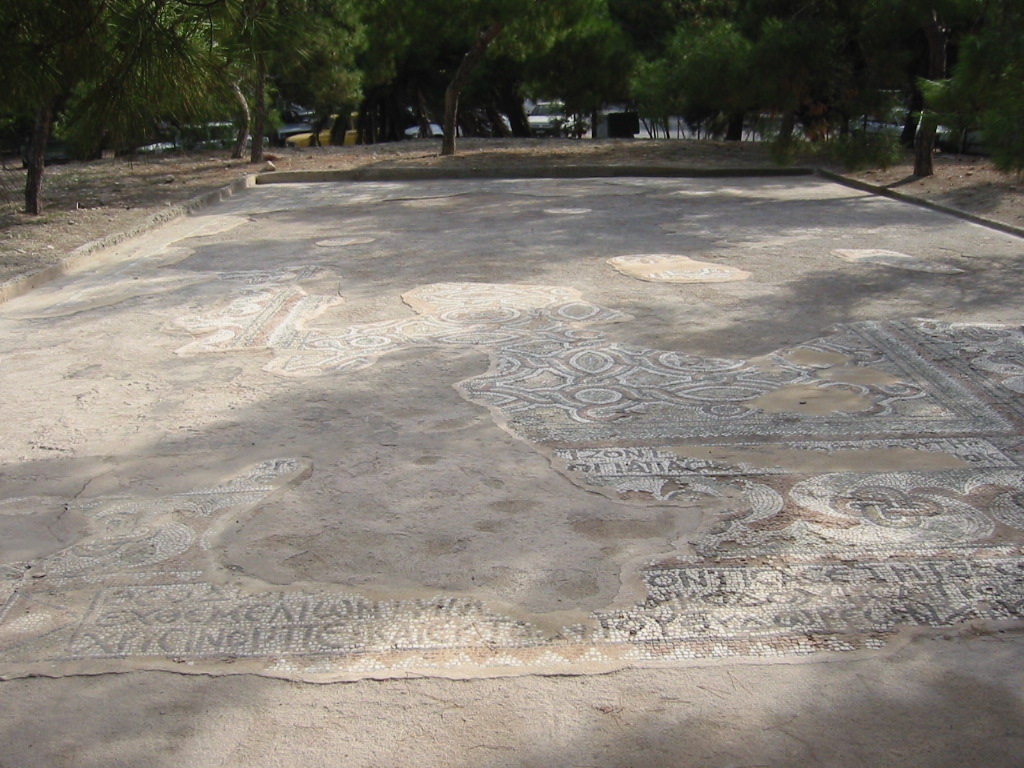
Mosaic floor of a Jewish Synagogue Aegina (300 CE)

The Jews living in countries west of the Levant formed the Hellenistic diaspora. The Egyptian diaspora is the most well known of these. Indeed, there was firm economic integration of Judea with the Ptolemaic Kingdom that ruled from Alexandria, while there were friendly relations between the royal court and the leaders of the Jewish community. This was a diaspora of choice, not of imposition. Information is less robust regarding diasporas in other territories. It suggests that the situation was by and large the same as it was in Egypt.

The Greeks viewed Jewish culture favorably, while Hellenism gained adherents among the Jews. While Hellenism has sometimes been presented (under the influence of 2 Maccabees, notably a work in Koine Greek) as a threat of assimilation diametrically opposed to Jewish tradition,

Adaptation to Hellenic culture did not require compromise of Jewish precepts or conscience. When a Greek gymnasium was introduced into Jerusalem, it was installed by a Jewish High Priest. And other priests soon engaged in wrestling matches in the palaestra. They plainly did not reckon such activities as undermining their priestly duties.

— Erich S. Gruen

Later historians would sometimes depict Hellenism and Judaism as uniquely incompatible, likely a result of the persecution of Antiochus IV. However, it does not appear that most Jews in the Hellenistic era considered Greek rulers any worse or different from their Persian predecessors. Writings of Hellenized Jews such as Philo of Alexandria show no particular belief that Jewish and Greek culture are incompatible; as another example, the Letter of Aristeas holds up Jews and Judaism in a favorable light by the standards of Greek culture. The one major difference that even the most Hellenized Jews did not appear to compromise on was the prohibition on polytheism; this still separated Hellenistic Jews from wider Greek culture in refusing to honor shrines, temples, gods etc. that did not pertain to the God of Israel.

=== Hellenistic rulers of Judea ===
Under the suzerainty of the Ptolemaic Kingdom and later the Seleucid Empire, Judea witnessed a period of peace and protection of its institutions. For their aid against his Ptolemaic enemies, Antiochus III the Great promised his Jewish subjects a reduction in taxes and funds to repair the city of Jerusalem and the Second Temple.

Relations deteriorated under Antiochus's successor Seleucus IV Philopator, and then, for reasons not fully understood, his successor Antiochus IV Epiphanes drastically overturned the previous policy of respect and protection, banning key Jewish religious rites and traditions in Judea (although not among the diaspora) and sparking a traditionalist revolt against Greek rule. Out of this revolt was formed an independent Jewish kingdom known as the Hasmonean dynasty, which lasted from 141 BCE to 63 BCE and eventually disintegrated into civil war.

== Hellenization of Jewish society ==
Overall, Jewish society was divided between conservative factions and pro-Hellenist factions. Pro-Hellenist Jews were generally upper-class or minorities living in Gentile-majority communities. They lived in towns that were far from Jerusalem and heavily connected with Greek trading networks.

The most significant literary achievement of Hellenistic Judaism was the development of the Septuagint. Other notable works include the Book of Wisdom, Sirach and pseudepigraphic apocalyptic literature such as the Assumption of Moses, the Testaments of the Twelve Patriarchs, the Book of Baruch and the Greek Apocalypse of Baruch. Some scholars consider Paul the Apostle to be a Hellenist Jew, even though he claimed to be a Pharisee (Acts 23:6).

Hellenistic Jews also created rewritten versions and expansions of biblical stories. As Erich S. Gruen points out, these writings show "a strong sense of identity and national self-consciousness."

Philo defended Judaism as a monotheistic philosophy that anticipated the tenets of Hellenistic philosophy. He also popularized metaphors such as "circumcision of the heart" to Greek audiences.

Hellenization was evident in the religious Jewish establishment:

'Ḥoni' became 'Menelaus'; 'Joshua' became 'Jason' or 'Jesus' [Ἰησοῦς]. The Hellenic influence pervaded everything, and even in the very strongholds of Judaism it modified the organization of the state, the laws, and public affairs, art, science, and industry, affecting even the ordinary things of life and the common associations of the people [...] The inscription forbidding strangers to advance beyond a certain point in the Temple was in Greek; and was probably made necessary by the presence of numerous Jews from Greek-speaking countries at the time of the festivals (comp. the "murmuring of the Grecians against the Hebrews," Acts vi. 1). The coffers in the Temple which contained the shekel contributions were marked with Greek letters (Sheḳ. iii. 2). It is therefore no wonder that there were synagogues of the Libertines, Cyrenians, Alexandrians, Cilicians, and Asiatics in the Holy City itself (Acts vi. 9).

The turbulence created by Alexander the Great's death also popularized Jewish messianism.

=== Diasporas ===
For two millennia, Jews lived in Greece and created the Romaniote Jewish community. They spoke Yevanic, a Greek dialect with Hebrew, Arabic and Aramaic influence. According to oral tradition, they were descendants of Jewish refugees who fled Jerusalem in 70 CE, after the destruction of the Second Temple. However, their presence dates back to 300-250 BCE, according to existing inscriptions. Greek philosophers such as Clearchus of Soli were impressed by Jews and believed they were descendants of Indian philosophers. Elsewhere, Jews in Alexandria created a "unique fusion of Greek and Jewish culture".

In addition to the Romaniote community, Jewish populations also lived further north in the Roman and Byzantine provinces of Illyricum, Moesia, and Thrace. These communities, sometimes referred to as Illyrian Jews, Jews of Slavia Graeca, or Pre-Ashkenazi Jews of the Balkans, consisted of Jews living in the imperial frontiers (limes) of the Balkans, often in garrison towns and trade cities along routes such as the Via Egnatia and Danube corridor. Imperial edicts from the Theodosian and Justinianic Codes reference Jewish populations in these regions, including rulings on synagogue property, trade, taxation, and religious rights—indicating an officially recognized and regulated presence in these frontier provinces.

These frontier Jews followed an eastern migratory route into Europe, distinct from the later western Mediterranean or Rhineland pathways. Archaeological remains from sites such as Stobi, Nicopolis ad Istrum, Ulpia Oescus, and Novae—including synagogue mosaics, epitaphs, menorah carvings, and dedicatory inscriptions—attest to their presence from the Hellenistic through early Byzantine periods.

By the early medieval period, many of these Balkan Jews migrated northward into the Carpathian Basin, where they became part of the Jewish communities under Magyar and later Hungarian rule. Over time, they were gradually absorbed into the emerging Ashkenazi population, bringing with them Greek-speaking traditions and liturgical customs distinct from Babylonian rabbinic norms.

== Aftermath ==
=== Impact of the Diaspora Revolt ===
In the early second century CE, Hellenistic Jewish communities across the Roman Near East suffered a catastrophe during the Diaspora Revolt (115–117 CE). A wave of violent uprisings—driven by messianic fervor and hopes for the ingathering of exiles and the reconstruction of the Temple—erupted simultaneously among Jewish communities in Egypt, Cyrenaica, and Cyprus. Some scholars suggest the revolts may have been intended to initiate a return to Judea. The Roman response under Emperor Trajan was exceptionally harsh, and has been described by modern historians as ethnic cleansing or genocide. The once-thriving Jewish populations in Egypt, Cyrenaica, and Cyprus were nearly annihilated, and evidence of Jewish presence in these regions vanished for centuries.

In Egypt, the Jewish population faced near-destruction, with the once-influential community in Alexandria eradicated and the city's renowned large synagogue in ruins. Jewish presence in Egypt virtually disappeared after the revolt, and it was not until the 3rd century that small Jewish communities began to re-establish themselves, although they never regained their former prominence. The Jewish communities in Cyrenaica and Cyprus were similarly obliterated, and there is no evidence of Jewish presence in these regions until the 4th century.

Meanwhile, early Christianity was developing into a distinct religious tradition. Initially a Jewish sect focused on Jews, the Jesus movement, especially through the efforts of Paul the Apostle, soon shifted its attention toward Gentile proselytes and God-fearers, and Greek-speaking circles sympathetic to Judaism. The rabbis were somewhat successful in countering Christian efforts to convert Jews in the first centuries. At the same time, the abrogation of Old Covenant laws—particularly the ending the necessity of circumcision for conversion—made Christianity more accessible than Judaism, which retained stricter standards. By the early second century, Christianity had become predominantly Gentile in both composition and theology, and its communities were clearly distinct from Jewish ones, both in Judaea and throughout the Greek-speaking diaspora. Small groups of Christian Jews continued to exist for several centuries, but were regarded by both mainstream Jews and Christians as heretical or sectarian offshoots.

=== Spread of Rabbinic Judaism ===
During late antiquity, Rabbinic Judaism emerged as the central framework for Jewish life. In the wake of the Temple's destruction in 70 CE, the rabbinic movement reconstituted Judaism with a greater focus on Torah study and good deeds, independent of Temple worship. Initially rooted in Judaea, it became dominant by the third century and gradually extended its influence to the Jewish communities in Babylonia, largely through the migration of scholars.

The rabbis ultimately incorporated much of the Greek-speaking diaspora into the rabbinic framework, though the exact means by which they did so are not well-documented. Nevertheless, in the centuries following the Jewish–Roman wars, a clear transformation is visible through a series of epigraphic markers in Western Diaspora communities. They include the growing appearance of the menorah (by far the most widespread symbol, appearing on epitaphs from Spain to the Black Sea and often accompanied by the lulav, etrog and shofar as markers of the Jewish calendar); the adoption of Semitic and biblically-derived Hebrew names such as Judah, Jacob, Sarah, and Isaac, replacing or supplementing Greek and Latin names; the use of Hebrew scripts in formulaic phrases such as "peace" or "the memory of the righteous is a blessing" drawn from Proverbs; honorific titles in Greek such as "student of the Law" and "teacher of the Law"; and the appearance of the word rabbi attached to community leaders. Taken together, these markers point to a gradual, empire-wide process of what archaeologist Anna Collar termed as "Hebraization". It is possible that the removal of Judaism's geographic anchors, Judea, Jerusalem, and the Second Temple, prompoted an inward religious turn that eventually brought dominance to rabbinic thought. This process was aided by the rise of Christian hostility, though nevertheless, the process began even before Christianity became a state religion in the Roman Empire.

Archaeologist Anna Collar argued that pre-existing ethnic bonds that connected Jewish diaspora communities throughout the Greco-Roman world were activated by persecution, converting a dispersed population into a high-fidelity strong-tie network. This rendered the Diaspora structurally receptive to religious innovation in an "information cascade" that drove the long-run transformation of the western Jewish diaspora from the Hellenistic Judaism of the classical period to the Hebraized Judaism of the medieval period.

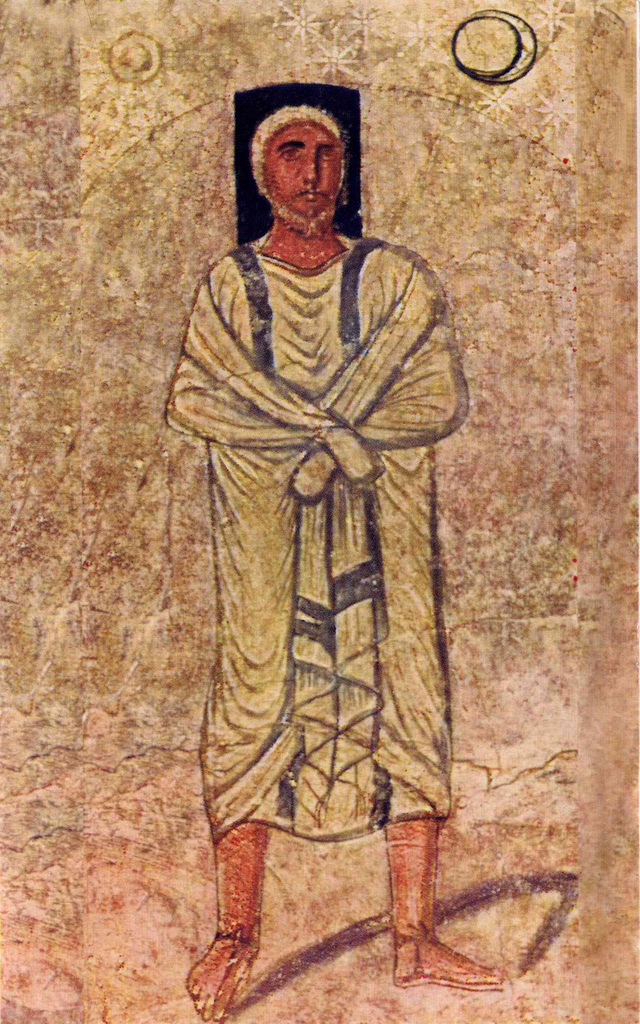
Joshua. Fresco from Dura-Europos synagogue.

== Legacy ==
Both early Christianity and early Rabbinical Judaism were far less doctrinal and less theologically homogeneous than they are today, and both were significantly influenced by Hellenistic religion and borrowed allegories and concepts from classical Hellenistic philosophy and the works of Greek-speaking Jewish authors of the end of the Second Temple period before the two schools of thought eventually affirmed their respective norms and doctrines, notably by diverging increasingly on key issues such as the status of purity laws, the validity of Christian messianic beliefs, and the use of Koiné Greek and Latin as liturgical languages replacing Biblical Hebrew.

The word synagogue comes from Jewish Koine Greek, a language spoken by Hellenized Jews across southeastern Europe, North Africa, and the Middle East after the 3rd century BCE. Many synagogues were built by the Hellenistai or adherents of Hellenistic Judaism in the Greek Isles, Cilicia, Northwestern and Eastern Syria, and Galilee as early as the first century BCE—notably in Delos, Antioch, Alexandretta, and Dura-Europos. Because of the mosaics and frescos representing heroic figures and Biblical characters (viewed as potentially conductive of "image worship" by later generations of Jewish scholars and rabbis), many of these early synagogues were at first mistaken for Greek temples or Antiochian Greek Orthodox churches.

Early rabbis of Babylonian descent, such as Hillel the Elder, whose parents were Aramaic-speaking Jewish migrants from Babylonia (hence the nickname "Ha-Bavli"), had to learn the Greek language and Greek philosophy to be conversant with sophisticated rabbinical language—many of the theological innovations introduced by Hillel had Greek names, most famously the Talmudic notion of Prozbul, from Koine Greek προσβολή, "to deliver":

Unlike literary Hebrew, popular Aramaic or Hebrew constantly adopted new Greek loanwords, as is shown by the language of the Mishnaic and Talmudic literature. While it reflects the situation at a later period, its origins go back well before the Christian era. The collection of the loanwords in the Mishna to be found in Schürer shows the areas in which Hellenistic influence first became visible- military matters, state administration and legislature, trade and commerce, clothing and household utensils, and not least in building. The so-called copper scroll with its utopian list of treasures also contains a series of Greek loanwords. When towards the end of the first century BCE, Hillel in practice repealed the regulation of the remission of debts in the sabbath year (Deut. 15.1-11) by the possibility of a special reservation on the part of the creditor, this reservation was given a Greek name introduced into Palestinian legal language- perōzebbōl = προσβολή, a sign that even at that time legal language was shot through with Greek.

— Martin Hengel, Judaism and Hellenism (1974)

The unique combination of ethnocultural traits inhered from the fusion of a Greek-Macedonian cultural base, Hellenistic Judaism and Roman civilization gave birth to the distinctly Antiochian "Middle Eastern-Roman" Christian traditions of Cilicia and the Levant:

"The mixture of Roman, Greek, and Jewish elements admirably adapted Antioch for the great part it played in the early history of Christianity. The city was the cradle of the church".

Following the destruction of the Jewish community in Egypt during the Diaspora Revolt, the Septuagint and other Jewish writings from the region were adopted and preserved by the early Christians. Some presently used Grecian "Ancient Synagogal" priestly rites and hymns have survived partially to the present, notably in the distinct church services of the followers of the Melkite Greek Catholic Church and its sister church the Greek Orthodox Church of Antioch in the Hatay Province of southern Turkey, Syria, Lebanon, Galilee in northern Israel, and in the Greek-Levantine Christian diasporas of Brazil, Mexico, the United States and Canada. Many of the surviving liturgical traditions of these communities rooted in Hellenistic Judaism and, more generally, Second Temple Judaism, were expunged progressively in the late medieval and modern eras by both Phanariot European-Greek (Ecumenical Patriarch of Constantinople) and Vatican (Roman Catholic) Gentile theologians who sought to “bring back” Levantine Greek Orthodox and Greek-Catholic communities into the European Christian fold: some ancient Judeo-Greek traditions were thus deliberately abolished or reduced in the process. Members of these communities still call themselves "Rûm" (literally "Roman"; usually referred to as "Byzantine" in English) as an endonym, and referring to the Greeks in Turkish, Persian and Levantine Arabic. In that context, the term Rûm is preferred over Yāvāni or Ionani (literally "Ionian"), the secular reference to Greeks in Ancient Hebrew, Sanskrit and Classical Arabic.

In parallel to these Levantine developments, decentralized Jewish communities also emerged in the Roman provinces of Illyricum, Moesia, and Thrace—sometimes referred to as "Illyrian Jews" or "Jews of Slavia Graeca." These groups settled in frontier zones of the Balkans and adhered to Greek-speaking, Jerusalem Talmud traditions of Judaism, distinct from the rabbinic movements of Judea and Babylonia. Archaeological remains—including synagogue inscriptions and funerary sites—indicate their presence from the 1st through the 6th centuries CE, particularly in cities such as Stobi, Nicopolis ad Istrum, and along the Via Egnatia. Over time, these Balkan Jewish communities either migrated northward into the Carpathian Basin or were absorbed into the larger Romaniote and Ashkenazi populations. Their liturgical practices and communal structure may have influenced later Jewish developments in Southeastern Europe.

== List of Hellenized Jews ==
=== Hellenistic and Hasmonean periods ===
- Andronicus son of Meshullam, Egyptian Jewish scholar of the 2nd century BCE. One of the first known advocates of early Pharisaic (proto-Rabbinical) orthodoxy against the Samaritans.
- Antigonus of Sokho, also known as Antigonos of Socho, was the first scholar of whom Pharisaic tradition has preserved not only the name but also an important theological doctrine. He flourished about the first half of the third century BCE. According to the Mishnah, he was the disciple and successor of Simon the Just. Antigonus is also the first noted Jew to have a Greek name, a fact commonly discussed by scholars regarding the extent of Hellenic influence on Judaism following the conquest of Judaea by Alexander the Great.
- Antigonus II Mattathias (known in Hebrew as Matityahu) was the last Hasmonean king of Judea. Antigonus was executed in 37 BCE, after a reign of three years during which he led the national struggle of the Jews for independence from the Romans.
- Alexander of Judaea, or Alexander Maccabeus, was the eldest son of Aristobulus II, king of Judaea
- Aristobulus of Alexandria (fl. 181–124 BCE), philosopher of the Peripatetic school who attempted to fuse ideas in the Hebrew Scriptures with those in Greek thought
- Artapanus of Alexandria (fl. 3rd century BC), Alexandrian Jewish writer who wrote a history Concerning the Jews, quoted by Polyhistor and Eusebius
- Cleodemus Malchus, Jewish historian referenced by Alexander Polyhistor and Josephus
- Eupolemus, an early Hellenic Jewish historian whose writings are known from Alexander Polyhistor and Eusebius Pamphili
- Ezekiel the Tragedian, Alexandrian Jewish poet who wrote a play Exagōgē, a paraphrase of the Exodus in iambic trimeter
- Jason of the Oniad family, High Priest in the Temple in Jerusalem from 175 to 172 BCE
- Menelaus, High Priest in Jerusalem from 171 BCE to about 161 BCE
- Mariamne I, Jewish princess of the Hasmonean dynasty, was the second wife of Herod the Great.
- Onias I (Hellenized form of Hebrew name (Greek: Ὀνίας) from (Hebrew: Honiyya) was the son of Jaddua mentioned in Nehemiah. According to Josephus, this Jaddua is said to have been a contemporary of Alexander the Great. I Maccabees regards Onias as a contemporary of the Spartan king Areus I (309–265 BCE). Onias I is thought to be the father or grandfather of Simon the Just.
- Ben Sira, also known as Yesu'a son of Sirach, leading 2nd century BCE Jewish scholar and theologian who lived in Jerusalem and Alexandria, author of the Wisdom of Sirach, or "Book of Ecclesiasticus".
- Simon Thassi (died 135 BCE) was the second son of king Mattathias and the first prince of the Jewish Hasmonean Dynasty. He was also a general (Doric Greek: στραταγός, stratagos; literally meaning "army leader") in the Greco-Syrian Seleucid army of Antiochus VI

=== Herodian and Roman periods ===
- Philo of Alexandria (Φίλων, Philōn; c. 20 BCE – c. 50 CE), also called Philo Judaeus, of Alexandria, in the Roman province of Egypt
- Flavius Josephus was the first Jewish historian. Initially a Jewish military leader during the First Jewish-Roman War, he famously switched sides and became a Roman citizen and acclaimed Romano-Jewish academic. He popularized the idea that Judaism was similar in many ways to Greek philosophy
- Justus of Tiberias, Jewish historian born in Tiberias, "a highly Hellenistic Galilean city", he was a secretary to governor Herod Agrippa II and rival of Flavius Josephus
- Julianos (Hellenized form of the Latin name Julianus) and Pappos (from Koine Greek pappa or papas 'patriarch' or 'elder') born c. 80 CE in the city of Lod (לוֹד; Greco-Latin: Lydda, Diospolis, Ancient Greek: Λύδδα / Διόσπολις – city of Zeus), one of the main centers of Hellenistic culture in central Israel. It is possible that Julian and Pappus led the Jewish resistance movement against the Roman army in Israel during the Kitos War, 115–117 CE (their Hebrew names were Shemaiah and Ahijah respectively)
- Lukuas, also called Andreas, Libyan Jew born c. 70 CE, was one of the main leaders the Jewish resistance movement against the Roman army in North Africa and Egypt during the Diaspora Revolt, 115–117 CE
- Trypho the Jew, thought to be a 2nd-century CE rabbi opposed to Christian apologist Justin Martyr, whose Dialogue with Trypho is paradoxically "equally influenced by Greek and Rabbinic thought." He is most likely the same as Rabbi Tarfon.

=== Late antiquity and early medieval periods ===
- The Radhanites: an influential group of Jewish merchants and financiers active in France, Germany, Central Europe, Central Asia and China in the Early Middle Ages – thought to have revolutionized the world economy and contributed to the creation of the 'Medieval Silk Road' long before Italian and Byzantine merchants. Cecil Roth and Claude Cahen, among others, claim their name may have come originally from the Rhône River valley in France, which is Rhodanus in Latin and Rhodanos (Ῥοδανός) in Greek, as the center of Radhanite activity was probably in France where their trade routes began.
- During Late Antiquity and the early medieval period, pre-Ashkenazi Jewish communities in the Balkans and the eastern Mediterranean continued to evolve under shifting Roman, Byzantine, and early Islamic rule. Frontier Jewish groups, including those in Illyricum and Thrace, often maintained Greek-speaking, Jerusalem-aligned traditions distinct from Babylonian rabbinism. Archaeological finds from this era—such as synagogue mosaics, inscriptions, and burial sites—indicate an active communal life and integration into regional trade networks. With the migration of Jews into the Carpathian Basin during and after the Avars (Caucasus) and Magyar periods (~6th–10th centuries), some of these communities contributed to the foundation of Eastern Ashkenazi Jewry, bringing with them pre-rabbinic liturgical elements and Hellenized customs.

== See also ==
- Greek Orthodox Patriarchate of Jerusalem
- Jewish apocrypha
- Jewish Christianity
- Paul the Apostle and Jewish Christianity
- Relations between Eastern Orthodoxy and Judaism
- Synagogal Judaism
- Therapeutae
