= Jewish Koine Greek =

Variety of Koine Greek

- Language family: Indo-European: Hellenic; Greek; (disputed); Attic–Ionic; Attic; Koine Greek; Jewish Koine Greek
- Early forms: Proto-Greek: Ancient Greek
- Writing system: Hebrew alphabet. Greek alphabet

Language codes
- ISO 639-3: –

Jewish Koine Greek, or Jewish Hellenistic Greek, is the variety of Koine Greek found in numerous Alexandrian dialect texts of Hellenistic Judaism, most notably in the Septuagint translation of the Hebrew Bible and associated literature, as well as in Greek Jewish texts from the Levant. The term is largely equivalent with Greek of the Septuagint as a cultural and literary concept rather than a linguistic category. The minor syntax and vocabulary variations in the Koine Greek of Jewish authors are not as linguistically distinctive as the later language Yevanic, or Judeo-Greek, spoken by the Romaniote Jews in Greece.

The term "Jewish Koine" is to be distinguished from the concept of a "Jewish koine" as a literary-religious—not a linguistic—concept.

== History of scholarship ==
Primary work on this area was conducted by scholars such as Henry Barclay Swete in chapter 4 of his Introduction to the Old Testament in Greek. However, Swete's emphasis on the peculiarity of the Greek of the Septuagint compared to other Greek texts of the period has largely been retracted by later scholars as plentiful non-Jewish Koine domestic and administrative papyri and inscriptions have been better recovered and studied. Since Swete the equation of Jewish common Attic with the "Greek of the Septuagint" has also been broadened, placing the Septuagint in the context of a wide range of Jewish texts of the period, most recently including the Greek texts among the Dead Sea Scrolls.

No ancient or medieval writer recognizes a distinct Jewish dialect of Greek. General academic consensus is that the Greek used in the Jewish Koine Greek texts does not differ significantly enough from pagan Koine Greek texts to be described as "Jewish Greek." This also applies to the language of the New Testament. Because of the dominant influence of the Septuagint the first documents of "Christian Greek" and early "Patristic Greek" are both an extension of classical Greek on the one hand, and of biblical and Jewish-Hellenistic Greek on the other. Only a thousand years later did there arise a true Jewish dialect of Greek, Yevanic.

== Grammar ==
Koine Greek grammar already departs from earlier Greek grammar in several areas, but the Jewish texts are generally consistent with other texts by non-Jewish authors, with the exception of a small number of grammatical semitisms. As would be expected, many Jewish texts show virtually no departures from the Koine or "common Attic" used by Gentile authors. Authors writing for Gentile audiences such as Josephus and Philo of Alexandria observe a standard of Greek grammar well above that of many surviving pagan sources.

== Neologisms ==
A major difference between the Septuagint and associated literature, and contemporary non-Jewish Koine texts is the presence of pure neologisms (new coinages) or new usage of vocabulary. However, hapax legomena may not always be neologisms, given the specialist subject matter of the Septuagint. Also, some of the "neologisms" of the Septuagint may not be wholly new coinages but rather "morphological neologisms"—new combinations of existing words (in the same manner as German neubildungen), such as the large number of compound words made up of two or more Hebrew words.

=== Examples ===
- Ioudaizein (Ἰουδαΐζειν): "to judaize" (Galatians 2:14, see Judaizers)
- sabbatizo (σαββατίζω): "(I) keep the sabbath"
- pseudoprophetes (ψευδοπροφήτης): "false prophet" (classical texts use ψευδόμαντις pseudomantis)

== See also ==
- Koine Greek phonology
- History of the Jews in Alexandria
- Biblical Greek – Dialect of Greek in the ancient world
