= Judah Leon ben Moses Mosconi =

Bulgarian rabbi (1328-?)

Judah Leon ben Moses Mosconi (Leo Grech; 1328 – before October 1377) was a Bulgarian Romaniote Jewish scholar and Talmudist born at Ohrid. Owing to the wars which agitated Bulgaria in the 14th century, Mosconi left his native country about 1360. He traveled in all the three continents of the Old World. He was in Chios and Cyprus, in Négropont (where he became the pupil of Shemariah b. Elijah al-Iḳriṭi), in Laodicea, and later in Egypt (where he studied under Obadiah Miẓri, to whom he owed "the greatest part of his learning"). He was afterward in Morocco, in Italy, and in France. In Perpignan he made the acquaintance of several scholars, among them Moses Narboni and David Bongoron.

He became a court physician to Peter IV of Aragon. The identification as Leo Grech of Mallorca was noted by Steinschneider and Baer.

Mosconi was well versed in philosophical works, both Hebrew and Arabic; but, having a predilection for metaphysics, he occupied himself particularly with Ibn Ezra's commentary on the Pentateuch, on which he wrote a supercommentary. Most of the 30 supercommentaries on Ibn Ezra which Mosconi examined during his wanderings were, in his opinion, worthless. According to Mosconi, Ibn Ezra wrote his commentary on the Prophets and Hagiographa before that on the Pentateuch, which he wrote 11 years before his death.

Mosconi collected fragments of the Yosippon in his Mediterranean travels. His edition became the basis of later versions.

Mosconi insisted on the necessity of studying grammar; and he blamed the commentators who neglected it. In his commentary he quotes the other works of Ibn Ezra, those of Samuel ben Hophni, Saadia's Arabic translation of the Pentateuch, Maimonides' commentary on the "Aphorisms" of Hippocrates, Averroes, and the other Arabian philosophers. Simultaneously with his supercommentary, Mosconi began to write other treatises, e.g.: En Gedi, an explanation of certain metaphysical passages disseminated in different works; Reaḥ Niḥoaḥ, a treatise on sacrifices; Ṭa'ame ha-Mibṭa, on grammar—all these works being left unfinished on account of the persecutions which he underwent.

Mosconi's preface to his commentary, in which he gives this information, was published by Abraham Berliner. Mosconi also revised the Yosippon and wrote a preface to it. Steinschneider thinks that the Moses Mosconi mentioned by Moses Begi in his Ohel Mosheh as having written against the Karaite Aaron b. Elijah is identical with Judah Leon Mosconi, whose name was incorrectly given by Begi.
