= Kehila Kedosha Janina =

Synagogue in Manhattan, New York

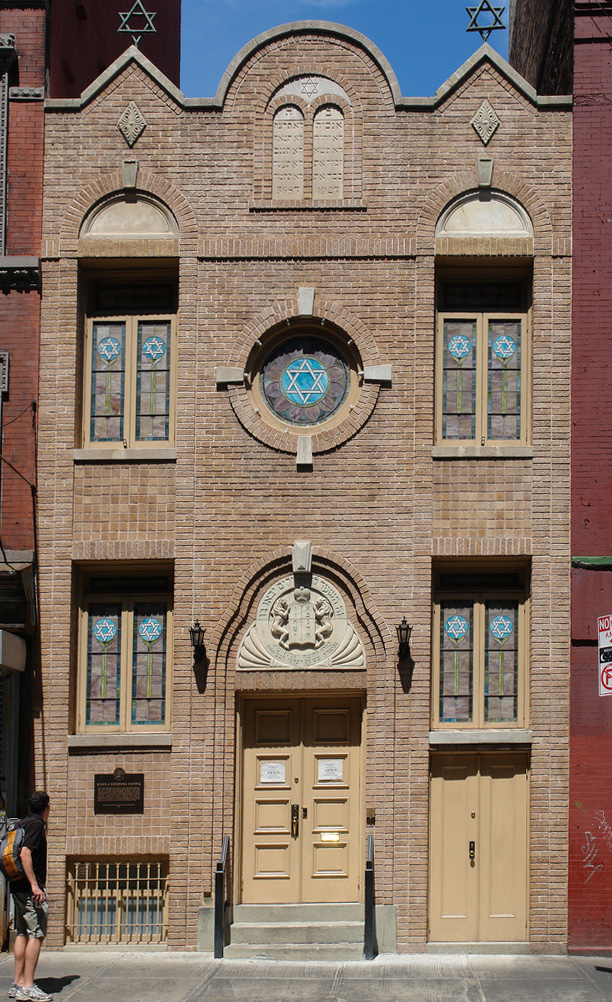
- Kehila Kedosha Janina synagogue in 2007

- Location in Lower Manhattan

Religion
- Affiliation: Judaism
- Rite: Romaniote
- Ecclesiastical or organisational status: Synagogue
- Leadership: Lay led
- Status: Active

Location
- Location: 280 Broome Street, Manhattan, New York City, New York
- Country: United States
- Coordinates: 40°43′7″N 73°59′28″W

Architecture
- Architect: Sydney Daub
- Type: Synagogue
- Style: Classical Revival; Moorish Revival
- Established: 1906 (as a congregation)
- Completed: 1927

Specifications
- Width: 20 feet (6.1 m)
- Materials: Brick; stone

Website
- kkjsm.org
- Kehila Kedosha Janina Synagogue
- U.S. National Register of Historic Places
- New York State Register of Historic Places
- New York City Landmark
- Area: less than one acre
- NRHP reference No.: 99001430
- NYSRHP No.: 06101.010586
- NYCL No.: 2143

Significant dates
- Added to NRHP: November 30, 1999
- Designated NYSRHP: September 22, 1999
- Designated NYCL: May 11, 2004

Kehila Kedosha Janina (Holy Community of Janina) is a synagogue located at 280 Broome Street between Allen and Eldridge Streets on the Lower East Side of Manhattan, New York City, New York, United States.

The synagogue is the only Romaniote rite synagogue in the Western Hemisphere. Romaniote traditions are separate from those of both Sephardic and Ashkenazi Judaism, deriving their lineage in the Eastern Mediterranean for nearly 2000 years, long before the Spanish Inquisition.

The building was built between 1925 and 1927 and was designed by Sydney Daub in the Classical Revival and Moorish Revival styles. It was added to the National Register of Historic Places on November 30, 1999, and was designated a New York City Landmark on May 11, 2004. After the city provided a $50,000 grant, the synagogue underwent a major restoration in 2006 by architect Leonard Colchamiro, a descendant of one of the community's original founders.

== History ==
Kehila Kedosha Janina is the only Romaniote synagogue in the Western Hemisphere. The congregation was founded in 1906 by Greek Jewish immigrants from Ioannina, but the synagogue itself was not erected until 1927. The years from then until the Second World War were a time of prosperity for the Romaniote community on the Lower East Side: there were three rabbis in the synagogue, and on the High Holidays, there was often only standing room for synagogue services. After the Second World War, many congregants moved to other boroughs and parts of Manhattan, including Harlem, the Bronx, and Brooklyn, though these communities are no longer active.

Although the community has steadily dwindled since its pre-war heyday, services are still held on shabbat and Jewish holidays. While it maintains a mailing list of 5,000 persons, it often has difficulty meeting the minyan for shabbat worship. Guided tours are offered each Sunday to visitors and by special appointment.

The Janina Landsmanshaft has a burial plot at Wellwood Cemetery where there is a memorial to the Jews of Ioannina murdered in the Shoah.

== Building layout ==
Kehila Kedosha Janina is somewhat unusual for a Romaniote synagogue in that it runs north south with the Ehal on the north side (Romaniote synagogues typically run east to west), the bimah is in the center of the main sanctuary (most Romaniote synagogues place the bimah on the west wall), and the internal stairway for the women's balcony. It is typical in the fact that men and women sit separately (a feature of all Orthodox synagogues). The second floor women's gallery contains a museum with artifacts, exhibits, and Judaica on Jewish life in Greece and the history of Greek Jews as well as a gift shop. Exhibited items are housed in cases along the walls on either side behind the seats, as well as in the area immediately in front of the staircase.

== Greek Jewish Festival ==
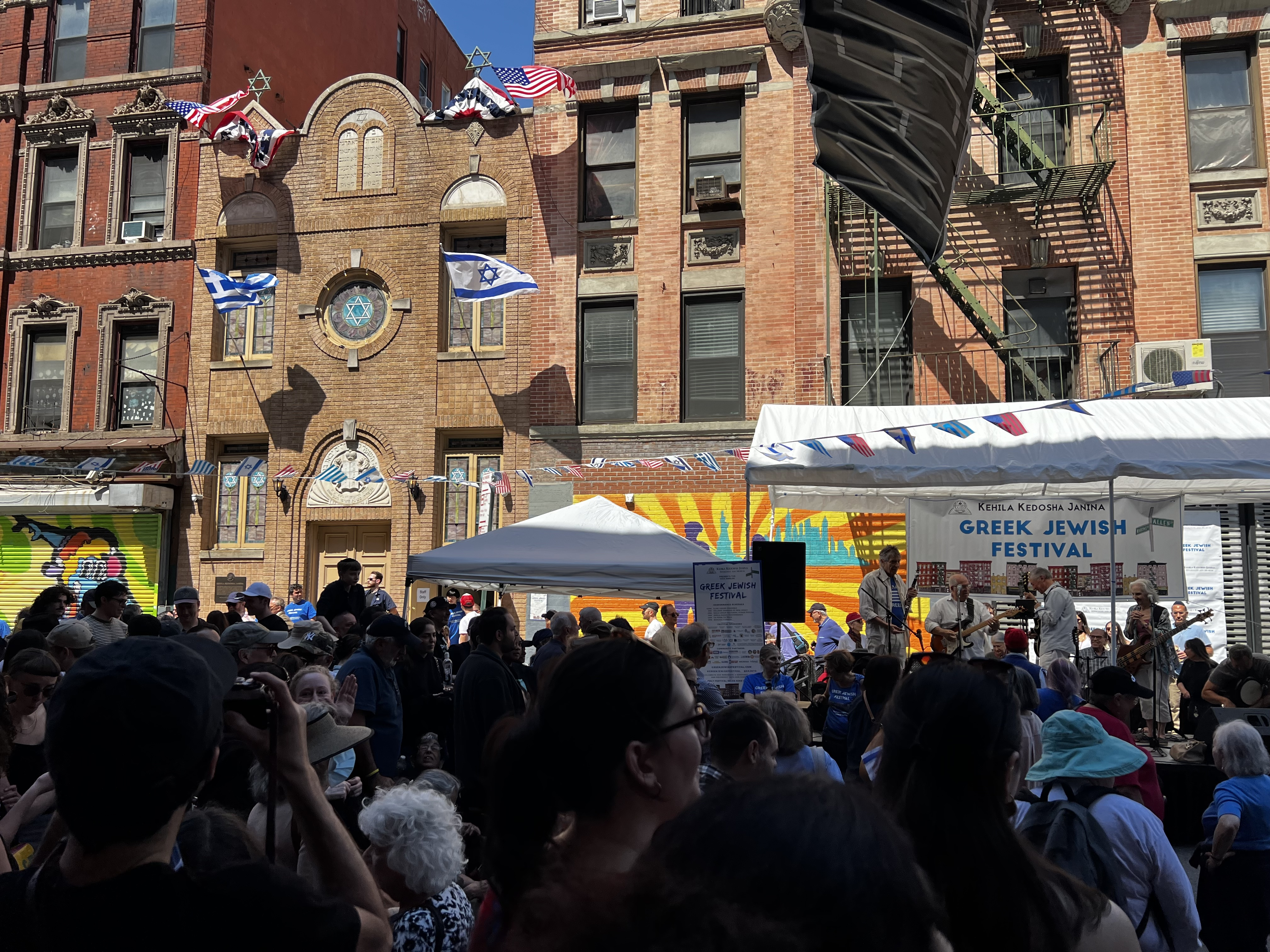
Greek Jewish Festival on May 11, 2025

To raise money the Kehila Kedosha Janina holds an annual Greek Jewish Festival around May, featuring live music, food, and kids' activities. During the event, the Kehila Kedosha Janina Museum also hosts tours.

== In popular culture ==
A documentary film about the synagogue and community, The Last Greeks on Broome Street, was produced in the early 2000s. It is directed, written and narrated by Ed Askinazi, whose great-grandparents were among the congregation's founders.

== See also ==
- List of New York City Designated Landmarks in Manhattan below 14th Street
- National Register of Historic Places listings in Manhattan below 14th Street
- Kehila Kedosha Yashan Synagogue
- Yanina Synagogue
