= Mordechai Frizis =

Greek army officer (1893–1940)

- Μαρδοχαίος Φριζής
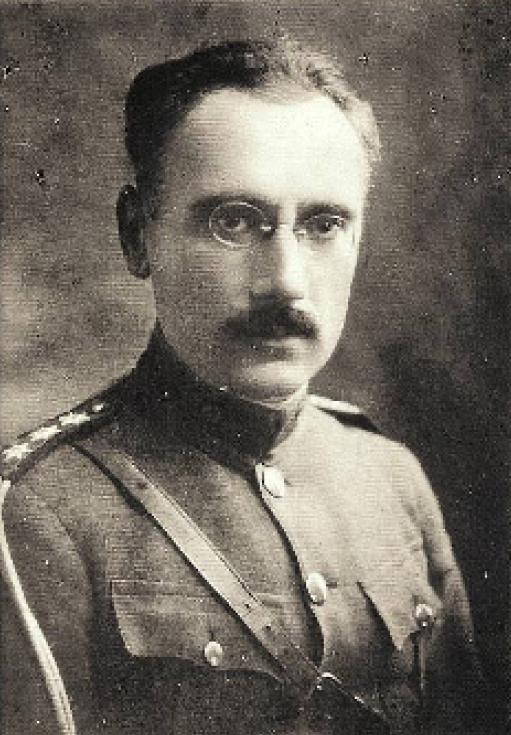
- Mordechai Frizis as a Captain
- Born: 1 January 1893; Chalcis, Kingdom of Greece
- Died: 5 December 1940 (aged 47); Përmet, Italian Protectorate of Albania
- Burial place: New Jewish Cemetery of Thessaloniki
- Education: National and Kapodistrian University of Athens; École militaire
- Spouse: Victoria Costi
- Military career
- Allegiance: Kingdom of Greece; Second Hellenic Republic
- Branch: Hellenic Army
- Service years: 1916–1940
- Rank: Colonel
- Conflicts: World War I; Macedonian Front; Russian Civil War; Southern Front; Southern Russia Intervention; Greco-Turkish War (1919-1922); World War II; Greco-Italian War †; Battle of Pindus

Mordechai Frizis (Greek: Μαρδοχαίος Φριζής; 1 January 1893 – 5 December 1940) was a Hellenic Army officer, who fought in World War I, distinguished himself in World War II, and was killed on 5 December 1940, fighting against the Julia Division.

== Biography ==
Frizis was born in Chalcis, on the island of Euboea, to a Romaniote-Jewish family, one of 12 children born to Jacob and Iopi Frizis. After studying law at Athens University, he enlisted in the Hellenic Army in 1916, and went to officer training school. He fought in World War I on the Macedonian front, and participated in the Allied intervention in the Russian Civil War, and becoming a Second Lieutenant in 1919. In 1922, as a newly promoted First Lieutenant, he took part in the Greco-Turkish War (1919–1922). He was taken prisoner, and as the only non-Christian Greek officer taken prisoner by the Turks during the campaign, was offered his freedom, but refused and elected to remain with his comrades, enduring eleven months of captivity.

After the war, Frizis was promoted to captain, and was sent to Paris to study at École Militaire. Upon his return to Greece, he was promoted to Major and posted to the Third Army Corps based in Thessaloniki.

During World War II, Frizis, now a Colonel, participated in the Greco-Italian War, and succeeded in repelling an Italian attack on the bridge of the Thyamis River, followed up by a Greek counterattack. When the Italians countered with aerial bombing, his men dismounted and took cover in trenches, while he continued riding his horse throughout the battlefield and shouting "courage" to rally his men, but was severely wounded in the stomach, but continued trying to rally his men. When the Italian aircraft withdrew, it was discovered that he had died of his injuries.

Following his death in action, the King of Greece, its then leader, Ioannis Metaxas, and a national newspaper left tributes for the officer. A spokesman for King George II of Greece wrote to Frizis' family: "On the glorious death for his country of your beloved husband, the heroic Colonel Mordechai Frizis, His Majesty the king has instructed me to convey to you and your family his deepest condolences".

Ioannis Metaxas, then Prime Minister of Greece, wrote the following letter to Frizis' wife: "I learnt of the death on the field of honour of your husband, before you knew of it and I did not know how to inform you. You and your family as well as those families, who have lost their protectors, will become the families of this state of ours. Please be assured that the protection of Greece will never leave you or your children. The children of Colonel Frizis will be revered by our nation's youth. With feelings of honour and love".

In 2002, his remains were located in Albania and were transferred to the New Jewish Cemetery of Thessaloniki.

The Greek state has honoured his memory by erecting busts of his at the War Museums of Kalpaki and Athens, in his birth town of Chalcis, and by giving his name to an Athens street.

== Gallery ==
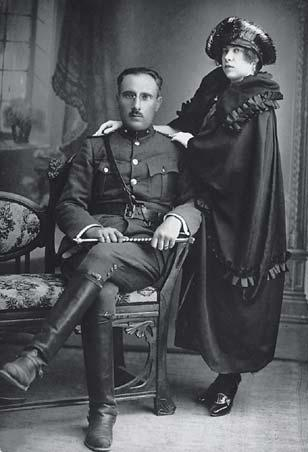
Frizis and his wife, Victoria Costi c. 1930s.

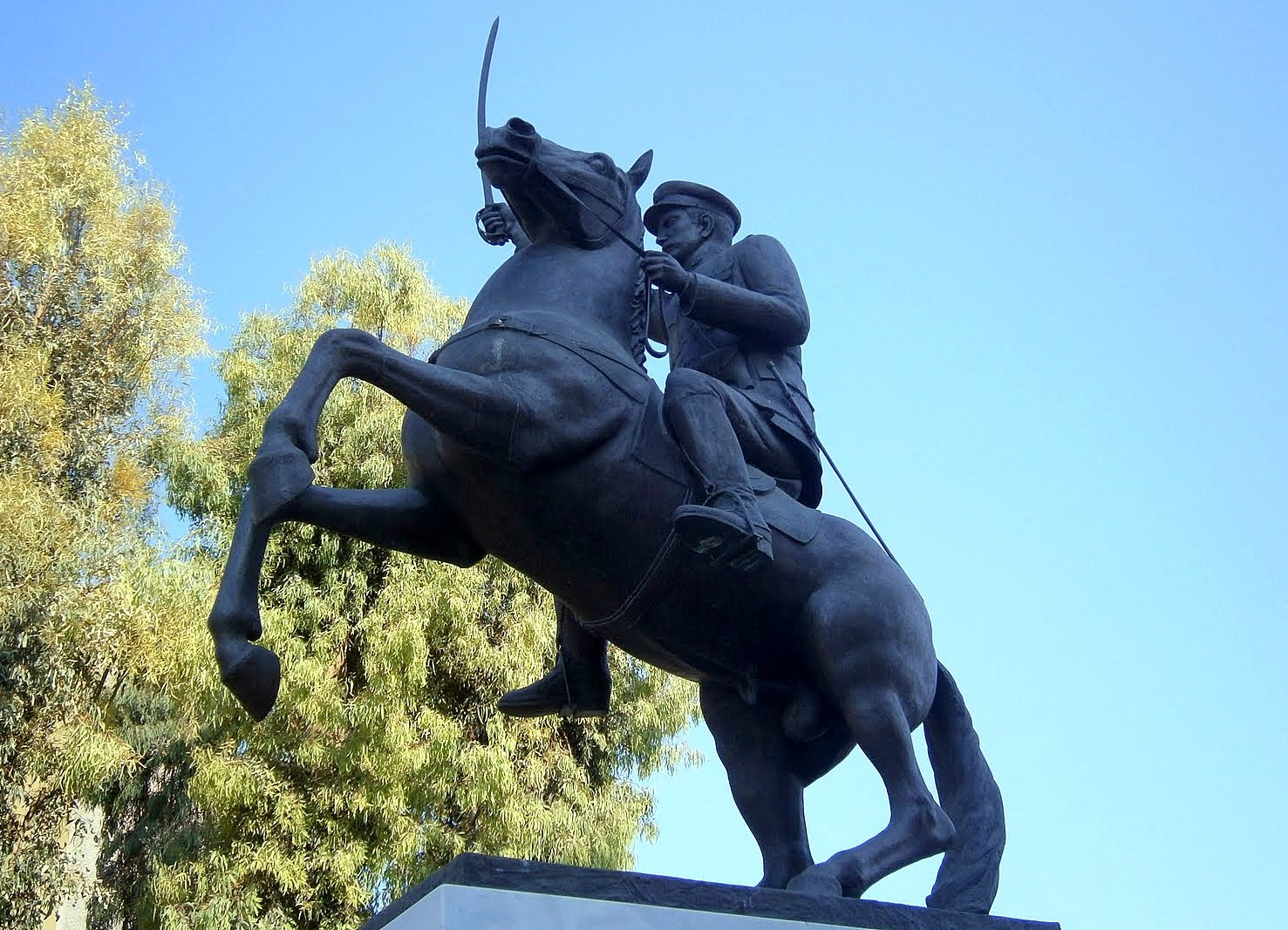
Memorial to Mordechai Frizis, in Chalkida.

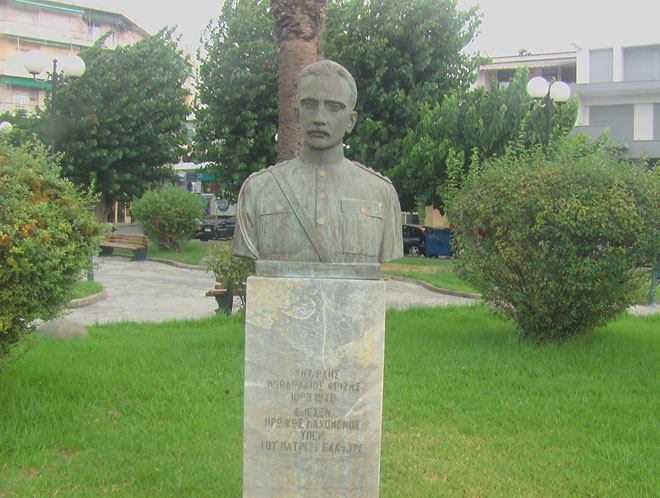
Bust of Frizis, in Chalkida.

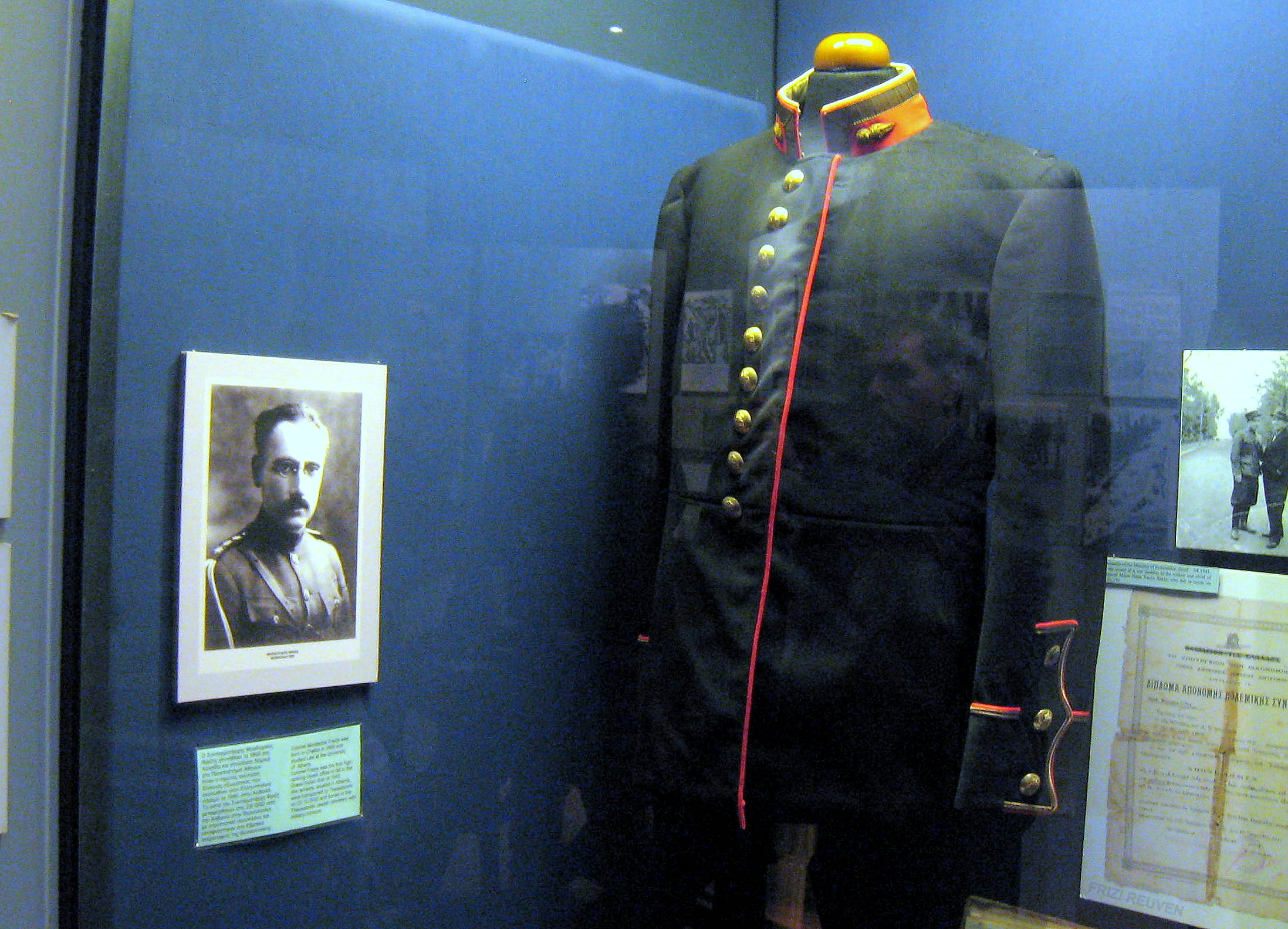
Frizis's uniform at the Jewish Museum of Thessaloniki.

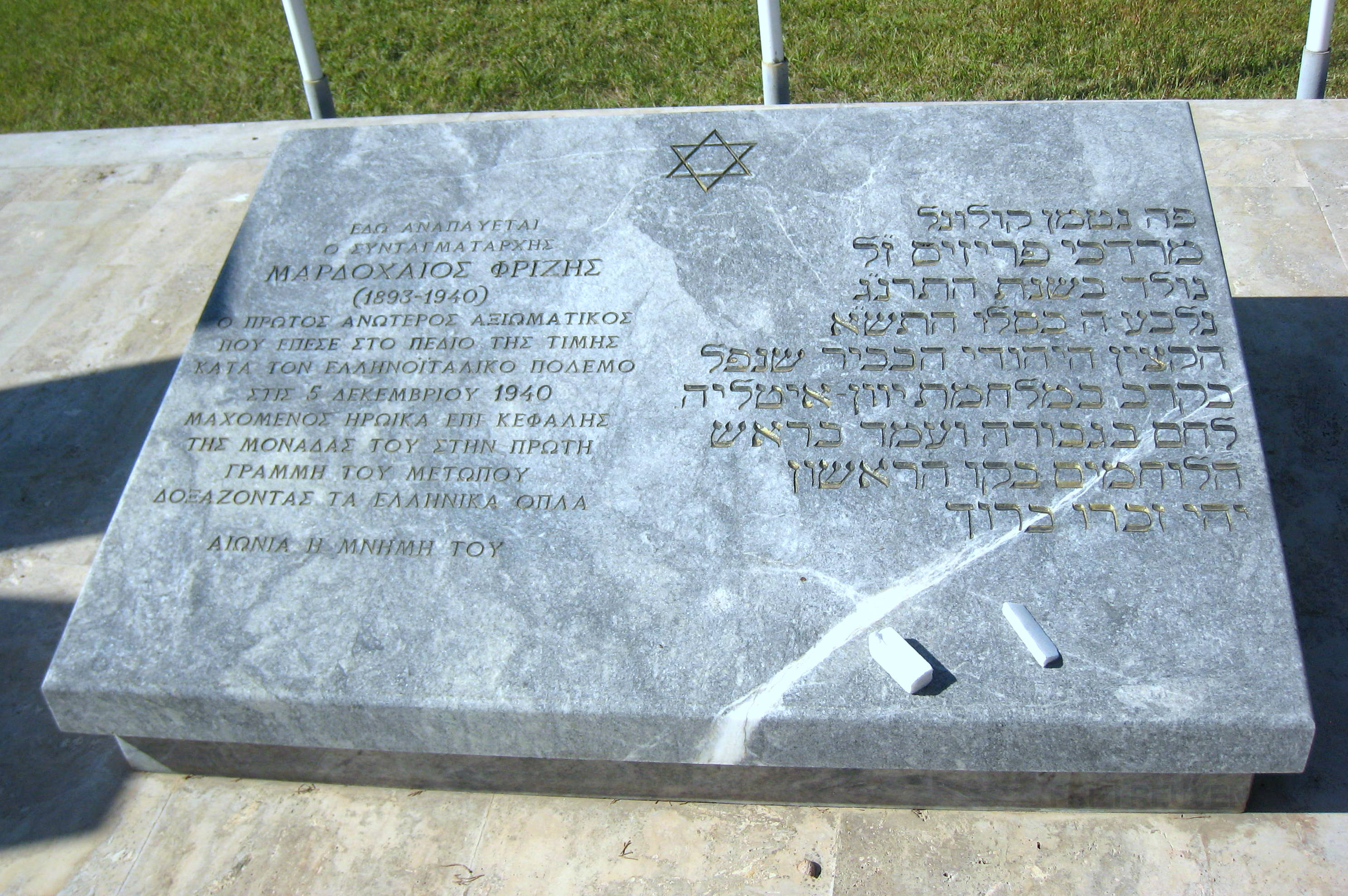
Frizis's grave at the New Jewish cemetery of Thessaloniki.
