= Alberto Nahmias =

Greek footballer and athlete

Personal information
- Date of birth: 1905
- Place of birth: Thessaloniki, Ottoman Empire
- Date of death: 1984 (aged 78–79)

Senior career*
Years	Team	Apps	(Gls)
1923–1933	Iraklis		

International career
1929	Greece	2	(1)
- * Club domestic league appearances and goals

Alberto Nahmias (Greek: Αλβέρτος Ναχμίας or Ναμίας; 1905, Thessaloniki – 1984) was a Greek football player and athlete of Romaniote Jewish descent who played for Iraklis. He was one of the most prominent of Greece's football team players of the 1920s and an irreplaceable member of Iraklis and the newly established Greece national football team.

A key player for Iraklis, he helped the club win their 3rd regional championship in 1927. He was also one of the players who were selected for Greece's first international game against Italy's second team. The game was held in Athens on 7 April 1929 and Nahmias scored the first ever goal of the national team in the 60th minute, leveling the match at 1–1. Greece eventually lost 1–4.

Apart from football, Nahmias was a track and field athlete, excelling in 100 metres, 400 metres hurdles and 4 × 100 metres relay. His performances allowed him to qualify for the 1924 Summer Olympics in Paris, but his participation was prevented by SEGAS, which refused to allow Macedonian athletes to travel to Paris due to financial reasons. In 1936, he was chosen as one of the 19 athletes in Thessaloniki who participated in the first Olympic torch relay.

During the Greco-Italian War, Nahmias was drafted among the other 12,898 Greek Jews. He returned to Thessaloniki, after he was wounded in the forehead at the front.
