= Onia =

Onia may refer to:

- Plural of onium, a bound state of a particle and its antiparticle
- Onia, Arkansas, an unincorporated community in Stone County, Arkansas
- Onia (clothing), a New York City based clothing company

== See also ==
- Onias (disambiguation)
- Oneia Mountains, pronounced /'onia/ in Modern Greek
