= Hillel ben Eliakim =

11th/12th-century Greek rabbi and Talmud scholar

Hillel ben Eliakim, known in Hebrew to Talmud scholars as Rabbeinu Hillel, ("Our Rabbi Hillel"), was a Greek rabbi and Talmud scholar. He lived during the 11th century and 12th century.

In his writings he mentions the name of his city, סלווידי. Some believe this refers to Silivri, others that it is a distortion of Saloniki, and other opinions exist too.

He was a pupil of Rashi, and is mentioned by Mordecai ben Hillel.

Hillel wrote the commentary Sifre ve Sifra Perush Rabbenu to Midrash, being a commentary on Sifrei and Sifra. In Sifra he often quotes Rashi and Isaac ben Melchizedek.
