= Moshe Pesach =

Greek rabbi (1869-1955)

- Μωυσής Πεσάχ/Πέσαχ
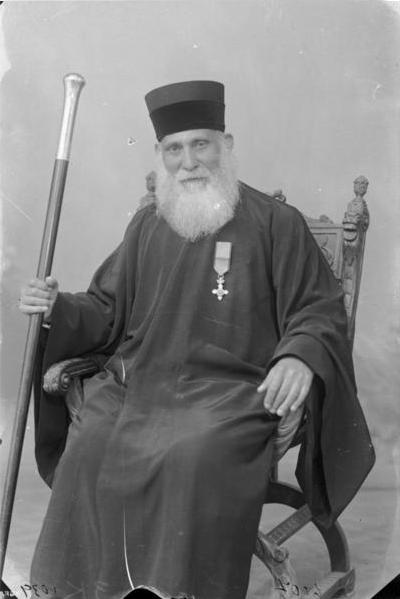
- Born: 1869; Larissa, Greece
- Died: 13 November 1955 (aged 85–86); Volos, Greece
- Burial place: Jerusalem
- Occupation: Rabbi
- Children: 2

Moshe Pesach (Greek: Μωυσής Πεσάχ or Πέσαχ; 1869 – 13 November 1955) was a Greek rabbi who was the rabbi of Volos from 1892 until his death, and chief rabbi of Greece from 1946. Through his efforts, and with the assistance of the Greek authorities, the majority of the city's Jewish community was saved during the Holocaust.

== Life ==
Moshe Pesach was born in Larissa in 1869, and studied Jewish literature and philosophy at Thessaloniki. From 1892 he was active in the Jewish community of Volos as a rabbi. In the early 20th century, the city of Volos had a vibrant Jewish community: a population of c. 500 in 1896 rose to c. 2,000 in 1930, before falling drastically to 882 members in 1940, due to emigration to the large cities of Thessaloniki and Athens or abroad. In 1939, he was awarded the Gold Cross of the Order of the Phoenix by King George II of Greece.

Following the German invasion of Greece in April 1941, Pesach was active in the underground network helping stranded Allied servicemen escape occupied Greece to the Middle East. During the early years of the Occupation, Volos was controlled by the Italian army. In 1943, as the Germans began to deport the Jews in their zone of occupation in Thessaloniki and Macedonia, the city received refugees, and many Jews of Volos began to flee the city to Athens or the surrounding countryside. After the Italian armistice in September 1943, the Germans took over the city. On 30 September, the German commandant, Kurt Rikert, summoned Pesach to his office and demanded a list of all Jews and their property within 24 hours, ostensibly for the purpose of determining food rations. Suspecting the Germans' real motives, Pesach managed to secure an extension of the deadline to three days, and immediately contacted the local Greek authorities: the mayor, chief of police, and the bishop of Demetrias, Joachim Alexopoulos. The latter contacted the local German consul, Helmut Scheffel, with whom he was befriended, and who confirmed that the Jews should leave as soon as possible. Provided with false identity papers and with a letter from the bishop to the local clergy to assist however possible, about 700 of the city's Jews dispersed in the countryside, where several joined the partisans. About 130 Jews, mostly those without means, remained behind. They were rounded up by the Germans on 24–25 March 1944 and sent to the death camps. 117 Jews from Volos were killed in the camps, 12 were executed there, and about 30 died of privations and starvation, but Pesach's actions saved 74% of the Jewish citizens of Volos, the second highest percentage in Greece after Zakynthos (where the entire Jewish community survived). Pesach himself survived among the partisans in the mountains, but his wife died from the privations, and his two sons, who taught Judaism in Thessaloniki and Didymoteicho, were captured and executed by the Germans.

After liberation, Pesach returned to Volos, becoming chief rabbi of Greece in 1946. He was honoured by the Allied Middle East Headquarters with a diploma, and in 1952, King Paul of Greece decorated him with the Order of George I. In April 1955, Volos was hit by a devastating earthquake. The aged rabbi was forced to live in a tent, later forfeiting his house in order to build a new synagogue in the same spot. He died on 13 November 1955. In 1957, the remains of Pesach and his wife Sara were brought to Jerusalem and interred next to Ben-Zion Meir Hai Uziel. His extensive library was transferred to the Ben-Zvi Institute.

On 16 April 2015, Pesach's role was commemorated at a special ceremony by B'nai B'rith and the Jewish National Fund at the Forest of the Martyrs in Jerusalem.
