= Onias =

Onias may refer to:

== People ==
- Any of the Jewish high priests known as Onias (Hebrew: חוֹנִיּוֹ Honio, also Honiyya or Honiyahu) at the time of the Second Temple, described by such sources as Josephus:
  - Onias I, son of Jaddua and high priest in the late 4th and early 3rd century BCE
  - Onias II, son of Simon the Just and probably grandson of Onias I, high priest in the early 2nd century BCE
  - Onias III, son of Simon II and high priest in the early 2nd century BCE
  - Onias IV, son of Onias III who was never high priest but built the temple in the Land of Onias
  - Menelaus (High Priest), who according to Josephus was originally called Onias, second successor and murderer of Onias III
- Onias C. Skinner (1817–1877), American jurist and legislator
- Onias Mupumha (born 1978), Zimbabwean sculptor

== Places ==
- The Land of Onias, an area in Ptolemaic Egypt named after Onias IV that was heavily settled by Jews
- Alpha Onias III, a planet in the Star Trek: The Next Generation episode "Future Imperfect"

== Distinguish from ==
- Onia (disambiguation)
