= Michael Matsas =

Greek Holocaust survivor (born 1930)

Michael Naoum Matsas (Greek: Μιχαήλ Ναούμ Μάτσας; born 1930) is a Greek Holocaust survivor and author. He was born in Ioannina, and survived the Holocaust by hiding with the Greek resistance.

== Works ==
- Matsas, Michael (1997). The Illusion of Safety: The Story of the Greek Jews During World War II. Pella Publishing Company. ISBN 0-918618-66-5.
- Matsas, Michael (2021): The Illusion of Safety: The Story of the Greek Jews During the Second World War. Second Edition. Vrachori Books. ISBN 978-0-578-87707-5.
