= Shemariah of Negropont =

Shemariah ben Elijah Ikriti of Negropont (born c. 1275, died c. 1355) (Hebrew: שמריה בן אליהו האיקריטי) was a Greek-Jewish philosopher and Biblical exegete, contemporary of Dante and Immanuel the Roman.

== Life ==
He was born probably at Rome, the descendant of a long line of Roman Jews. His father, in his youth, went as rabbi to Crete, whence his surname, "Ha-Yewani" (="the Greek"), or "Ha-Iḳriṭti" (= "the Cretan"). Shemariah had a critical mind, and knew Italian, Latin, and Greek. Up to 1305 he studied the Bible exclusively; then he took up Talmudic aggadah and philosophy. The earliest Tractatus version in Hebrew was translated by Shemariah and presented as his own work, titled Sefer ha-Hihhayon.

His reputation was such that he was called to the court of King Robert of Naples (who acted as his patron), where he devoted himself chiefly to Biblical studies and wrote commentaries on Scripture. By 1328 he had completed philosophic commentaries on the Pentateuch (especially the story of the Creation), the Book of Job, and the Song of Songs. He aimed at bringing about a union between Karaites and Rabbinites; the Karaites, in fact, recognized and honored him. Shemariah addressed an Epistle on the Creation of the World to Robert in 1328. Shemariah of Negroponte also dedicated a commentary on the Song of Songs to the King, comparing the latter to King Solomon.

The death of a son (1330) interrupted his work for a time, but he soon took it up again. In 1346 he wrote his Sefer ha-Mora, a refutation of the philosophical views on the Creation. Believing that he had placed Rabbinism on a sure foundation, Shemariah undertook, in 1352, a journey to Castile and Andalusia, in order to convert the Karaites. In a single manuscript poem, he is said to have pretended to be the Jewish Messiah, and was reviled to such an extent that the government arrested him. He died in prison. Like most of his contemporaries, he was scientifically an epigone of the great philosophers and exegetes. He also wrote Elef ha-Magen (a commentary on the aggadah in the treatise Megillah), some piyyuṭim, and poems.
