= Yevanic =

Endangered Greek dialect

- Romaniyot, Judaeo-Greek
- יעואני גלוסא, γεβανί γλώσσα yevani glosa
- Native to: Originally Greece, recently Israel, Turkey, United States
- Native speakers: "A few semi-speakers left in 1987 [in Israel], and may be none now [as of 1996 or earlier]. There may be a handful of elderly speakers still in Turkey."
- Language family: Indo-European: Hellenic; Greek; (disputed); Attic–Ionic; Attic; Koine; Jewish Koine; Yevanic
- Writing system: Hebrew alphabet

Language codes
- ISO 639-3: yej
- Glottolog: yeva1238
- ELP: Yevanic
- Linguasphere: 56-AAA-am

Yevanic, also known as Judaeo-Greek, Romaniyot, Romaniote, and Yevanitika, is a Greek dialect formerly used by the Romaniotes and by the Constantinopolitan Karaites (in whose case the language is called Karaitika or Karaeo-Greek). The Romaniotes are a group of Greek Jews whose presence in the Levant is documented since the Byzantine period. Its linguistic lineage stems from the Jewish Koine spoken primarily by Hellenistic Jews throughout the region, and includes Hebrew and Aramaic elements. It was mutually intelligible with the Greek dialects of the Christian population. The Romaniotes used the Hebrew alphabet to write Greek and Yevanic texts. Judaeo-Greek has had in its history different spoken variants depending on different eras, geographical and sociocultural backgrounds. The oldest Modern Greek text was found in the Cairo Geniza and is actually a Jewish translation of the Book of Ecclesiastes (Kohelet).

== Origin of name ==
The term Yevanic is an artificial creation from the Biblical word יון (Yāwān) referring to the Greeks and the lands that the Greeks inhabited. The term is an overextension of the Greek word Ἰωνία (Ionia in English) from the (then) easternmost Greeks to all Greeks. The word for Greece in Hebrew is Yavan; likewise, the word yevanit is used to refer to the Greek language in Hebrew.

== Geographical distribution ==
A small number of Romaniote Jews in the United States, Israel, Greece, and Turkey have some knowledge of the Judaeo-Greek language. The language is highly endangered and could completely die out. There are no preservation programs to promote or to revive the language, but starting in April, 2022, the Oxford School for Rare Jewish languages will be offering a beginner's course. In 1987, there were 35 speakers left in Israel, the majority located in Jerusalem. This population may have died out.

As of 2019, a few elderly Jews in Ioannina, Greece still speak the language.

As of 2021 there is a small population of speakers in Iran.

== Historical background ==
Greece, Constantinople, Asia Minor, Southern Italy, the Balkans and Eastern Europe had originally a Greek-speaking Jewish community. After the arrival of Jewish refugees into these areas from the Iberian Peninsula, Northern Italy, and Western Europe, the Greek-speaking Jewish communities began to almost disappear while integrating into the group of the newcomers, which did not constitute in every area of their new homeland the majority.

The immigration of Italian and Spanish-speaking people into Greece in the late 15th century altered the culture and vernacular of the Greek Jews. A lot of locales picked up on Judeo-Spanish language and customs, however some communities in Epirus, Thessaly, the Ionian Islands, Crete, Constantinople and Asia Minor kept the old, so-called "Romaniote minhag" and the Judaeo-Greek language. During the 19th century Yevanic switched from Hebrew letters to Greek letters. By the early 20th century, the Jews living in places such as Ioannina, Arta, Preveza, and Chalkida still spoke a form of Greek that slightly differentiated the Greek of their Christian neighbors. These differences, semantically, do not go beyond phonetic, intonational, and lexical phenomena. It is different from other Jewish languages, in that there is no knowledge of any language fragmentation ever taking place.

At the start of World War II Northern Greece alone had ten thousand speakers, but the language was almost totally annihilated during the Holocaust with only 149 speakers surviving.

== Features ==
Yevanic is based on Greek, but it contains large amounts of influence from Hebrew, Arabic, and Aramaic. It also used a different alphabet than Greek using Hebrew letters instead of Greek letters. The languages also has loan translations from Ladino.

== Current status ==
The assimilation of the Romaniote communities by the Ladino-speaking Sephardi Jews, the emigration of many of the Romaniotes to the United States and Israel, and the murder of many of the Romaniotes during the Holocaust have been the main reasons of the decline of Judaeo-Greek. The survivors were too scant to continue an environment in which this language was dominant and more recent generations of the survivors have moved to new locations such as Greece, Israel, and the United States and now speak the respective languages of those countries: Greek, Hebrew, and English.

The Jews have a place of note in the history of Modern Greek. They were unaffected by Atticism and employed the current colloquial vernacular which they then transcribed in Hebrew letters. The Romaniotes were Jews settled in the Eastern Roman Empire long before its division from its Western counterpart, and they were linguistically assimilated long before leaving the Levant after Hadrian's decree against them and their religion. As a consequence, they spoke Greek, the language of the overwhelming majority of the populace in the beginning of the Byzantine era and that of the Greek élite thereafter, until the fall of the Ottoman Empire. Some communities in Northern Greece and Crete maintained their specific Romaniote practices since these communities were either geographically apart from the Sephardim or had different synagogues, and because their liturgies differed greatly. At the end of the 19th century, the Romaniote community of Greece made an effort to preserve the Romaniote liturgical heritage of Ioannina and Arta, by printing various liturgical texts in the Hebrew printing presses of Salonika.

Yevanic has some samples on the internet but it lacks translations or spell checking, unlike larger more established languages.

== Literature ==
There is a small amount of literature in Yevanic dating from the early part of the modern period, the most extensive document being a translation of the Pentateuch. A polyglot edition of the Bible published in Constantinople in 1547 has the Hebrew text in the middle of the page, with a Ladino (Judaeo-Spanish) translation on one side and a Yevanic translation on the other. In its context, this exceptional cultivation of the vernacular has its analogue in the choice of Hellenistic Greek by the translators of the Septuagint and in the New Testament.

== Sample text ==
Yevanic	Transliteration	English
קֵאִ יטוֹן פְרוֹפִיטִיאָה קִירִיאוּ פְּרוֹשׁ יוֹנָה אִיוּ אֲמִתָּי טוּ אִיפִּין׃ אַנַשְׁטָא פּוֹרֶבְגוּ פְּרוֹשׁ נִנְוֶה טִין בּוֹלִי טִין מֶגָלי קֶדִֿיאָלָלִישֶי אִיפִּי אַפְטִין אוֹטִי אֶנֶבִין אִיקָקִיאָה אַפְטִין אֶנוֹפִּיאוֹמוּ	Ke itοn prοfitía Kiriu pros Iona iu Amitaï tu ipin: "Anásta, pοrevghu pros Ninve tin poli tin megháli ke dialálise epi aftin oti enevin i kakia aftin enopion mu."	The word of the Lord came to Jonah the son of Amittai saying, "Arise, go to Nineveh the great city and cry against it, for their wickedness has come up before Me."

== See also ==
- History of the Jews in the Byzantine Empire
- Jewish languages
