= Koine Greek grammar =

Koine Greek grammar is a subclass of Ancient Greek grammar peculiar to the Koine Greek dialect. It includes many forms of Hellenistic era Greek, and authors such as Plutarch and Lucian, as well as many of the surviving inscriptions and papyri.

Koine texts from the background of Jewish culture and religion have distinct features not found in classically rooted writings. These texts include the Septuagint (Greek Old Testament, which includes the Deuterocanonical books), New Testament, Josephus, Philo of Alexandria, the Greek Old Testament Pseudepigrapha, and early Patristic writings.

== Similarities to Attic grammar ==
The commonalities between Attic and Hellenistic era Greek grammar are far greater than the differences. Where divergences became too wide the focus was attracted of the "Atticism", language purists, who sought in their writing to leave the lingua franca of the marketplace for the classical style.

== Differences from Attic grammar ==
James Morwood in Oxford Grammar of Classical Greek lists "some key features of New Testament grammar", many of which apply to all Koine texts: Friedrich Blass and Albert Debrunner's Grammatik des neutestamentlichen Griechisch is a grammar designed for those who know Classical Greek, and describes Koine Greek in terms of divergences from Classical. It has been revised in Germany by Friedrich Rehkopf, and translated into English and revised by Robert W. Funk.

=== Grammatical forms ===
Simplification of accidence with difficulties and irregularities reduced:

- fewer irregular comparatives
- third declension adjectives become rarer
- monosyllabic nouns with irregular declension become rarer
- verbs in -μι are given the endings of verbs in -ω
- 1st (weak) aorist endings often replace 2nd (strong) aorists
- Dual number now completely eliminated
- Frequency of optative decreased.

=== Syntax ===
The following changes occur in syntax:

- ἵνα ("that") is now used for "[with the result] that...", "[he said] that", and command forms, offering an alternative for (but not quite replacing) the accusative and infinitive construction.
- some prepositions are used more where case declension makes this strictly redundant in Attic
- pronouns are supplied more where the sense is still clear without them
- diminutives are used more often, but also do not always carry any diminutive meaning. This is particularly true in Jewish texts, e.g. "[little] wing of the temple"
- conjunctions are used with differing frequencies from natural Greek. For example, the ratio of καί to δέ at the beginning of sentences is higher, influenced by Semitic languages.
- τότε 'then' as a common narrative conjunction reflects Aramaic influence from the Second Temple period (5th century BCE to 1st century CE)

=== Verbs ===
==== Infinitive of purpose ====
The infinitive is now used for "[in order] to do", either as a plain infinitive or with the genitive of the definite article (τοῦ) before it (as a verbal noun).

==== Middle voice ====
In Hellenistic era Greek, middle voice is often replaced by active voice with reflexive pronouns. This means that the middle voice verbs that remain are less likely to be true reflexive voice than in Attic Greek, and the majority of New Testament middle voice verb usage comes into other categories. Among those other uses is the use of middle voice as an approximation to causative.

== Semitisms in "Jewish Greek" ==
The comments above that also apply to the New Testament are generally true for Koine texts with no "Jewish Greek" influence. The following comments, however, apply to texts influenced by a knowledge of either Jewish literature or Jewish oral traditions:

=== Semitic phraseology ===
Numerous semitisms in grammar and phraseology occur, e.g. impersonal egeneto (ἐγένετο) "it came to pass" introducing a finite verbal clause, representing the impersonal Hebrew ויהי structure.

=== Semitic word order? ===
The use of the inverted AB-BA structures found in Hebrew poetry, known as chiastic structure, is also often classed as a semitism, but is also found in Homer. Likewise the repetition of nouns with distributive force, e.g. sumposia sumposia ("by groups", Mark 6:39) could be Semitism, but it is also current in vulgar (common) Greek. Many aspects of New Testament word order, such as avoiding the "Atticist" affectation of placing the verb at the penult of the sentence, are simply natural 1st-century Greek style.

=== Semitic vocabulary ===
Although vocabulary does not truly count as grammar, other than in irregular declension and plurals, it is mentioned here for completeness. A small number of easily identifiable items of Semitic vocabulary are used as loanwords in the Greek of the Septuagint, New Testament and Patristic texts, such as satanas for Hebrew ha-Satan. Less evident Semitisms occur in vocabulary usage, and semantic content (range of meaning). Numerous words in the New Testament are used in ways that derive from the Septuagint rather than secular or pagan usage. In particular, there is religious vocabulary peculiar to Judaism and monotheism. For example, angelos (ἄγγελος) more frequently means "angel" than "messenger", and diabolos (διάβολος) means Job's "devil" more often than mere "slanderer".

== Tense-aspect debate ==
A debate currently exists as to the meaning of the tense-forms found in Koine Greek. It is widely held that Koine Greek tense-forms are aspectual, but whether or not tense (semantic time reference) is included, as well as the number of aspects, is under discussion.

Stanley E. Porter argues that there are three aspects: perfective, imperfective and stative. On the other hand, Constantine R. Campbell finds only two aspects, and adds a category of "proximity" to further differentiate tense of and regards the perfect tense-form (regarded by Porter as aspectually stative) as imperfective in aspect and more intensely proximal than the present. Campbell's view of Koine Greek tense-forms can be summarised in this way:

Tense-form	Semantic aspect	Semantic proximity	Typical pragmatic values
Aorist	Perfective	Remote	Past temporal reference
Future	Perfective	Future	
Present	Imperfective	Proximate	Present tense, Historical present, direct speech, directional verbs
Imperfect	Imperfective	Remote	Past tense, background information
Perfect	Imperfective	Heightened proximity	Direct speech
Pluperfect	Imperfective	Heightened remoteness	Background of background information

== See also ==
- Koine Greek phonology
