= Gamaliel's principle =

Biblical theory to leave matters to God

Gamaliel's principle, also called Gamaliel's rule, Gamaliel's rule-of-thumb, Gamaliel's counsel, Gamaliel's law, or the Gamaliel attitude, is a principle outlined in the Book of Acts in the New Testament by the Rabban Gamaliel. (Note: The "Gamaliel" named in the Bible is almost certainly the famous Gamaliel the Elder, who for some time was president of the Sanhedrin, as opposed to his grandson Gamaliel II or another Gamaliel. According to the Pulpit Commentary, the events and context of the story put his identity "beyond all reasonable doubt".) Gamaliel cautions the Jewish Sanhedrin against killing Jesus' disciples, saying that if their ideas were of human origin, they would "come to nought" and the Jews did not need to worry about them; but if they were from God, their ideas would be impossible to overthrow anyway, and if the Jews tried to stop them, they would be fighting against God. Therefore, in Gamaliel's view it would be better to do nothing and let God take care of the situation.

In modern times Gamaliel's principle has been used in support of religious pluralism and reforms within religious groups.

== Origin ==
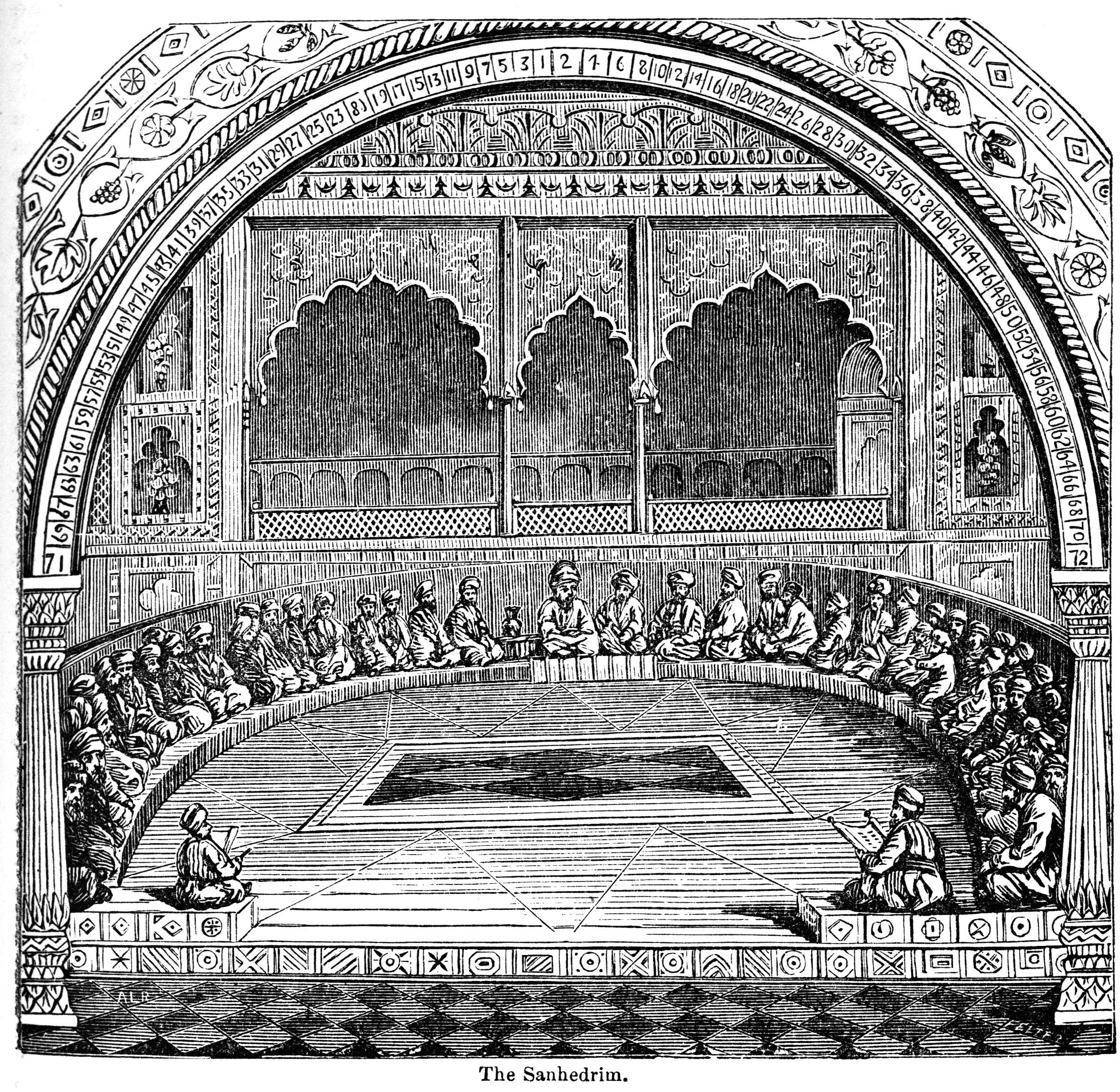
The Sanhedrin was made up of Jewish rabbis who acted as judges.

In Acts 5 in the New Testament, an account is told of the apostles of Jesus being brought before the Sanhedrin in Jerusalem, which acted as a Jewish court system. The high priest accuses them of disobeying an order to stop preaching, to which the apostle Peter responds by beginning to preach to the Sanhedrin. The Sanhedrin then considers killing the apostles in retaliation, at which point Gamaliel gives the following advice:

"And now I say unto you, Refrain from these men, and let them alone: for if this counsel or this work be of men, it will come to nought:
"But if it be of God, ye cannot overthrow it; lest haply ye be found even to fight against God."

- Acts 5:38–39, King James Version

To prove his point, Gamaliel also notes two examples, Theudas and Judas of Galilee, who gained a large following but came "to nought". According to the Bible, the other rabbis in the Sanhedrin agree with Gamaliel and decide to not kill the disciples, instead having them beaten and then released.

Various theories have been put forth regarding Gamaliel's motives, and how much he believed or disbelieved the Christians, and some have even theorized that he secretly was a Christian, although there is no evidence to support that theory. (Note: The Pulpit Commentary states that there is not "any foundation for the legend... that he was in secret a Christian.") It is also possible he was happy that the Christians were preaching the resurrection from the dead, a doctrine which he believed in as a Pharisee, but the Sadducees in the Sanhedrin did not. According to the Pulpit Commentary, there is "no doubt" that being a Pharisee "would rather dispose him to resist the violent counsels of the Sadducean members, and the more so as the doctrine of the Resurrection was in question." According to Alexander Maclaren, Gamaliel was known to be "prudent, wise, cautious and calm, tolerant, opposed to fanaticism and violence" and so it is unsurprising he would have given advice such as this. It is also possible Gamaliel did not want the Sanhedrin to anger the general population in Jerusalem, because many of them supported the Christians; and according to John F. MacArthur it is likely that he really did believe what he said.

== Modern application ==
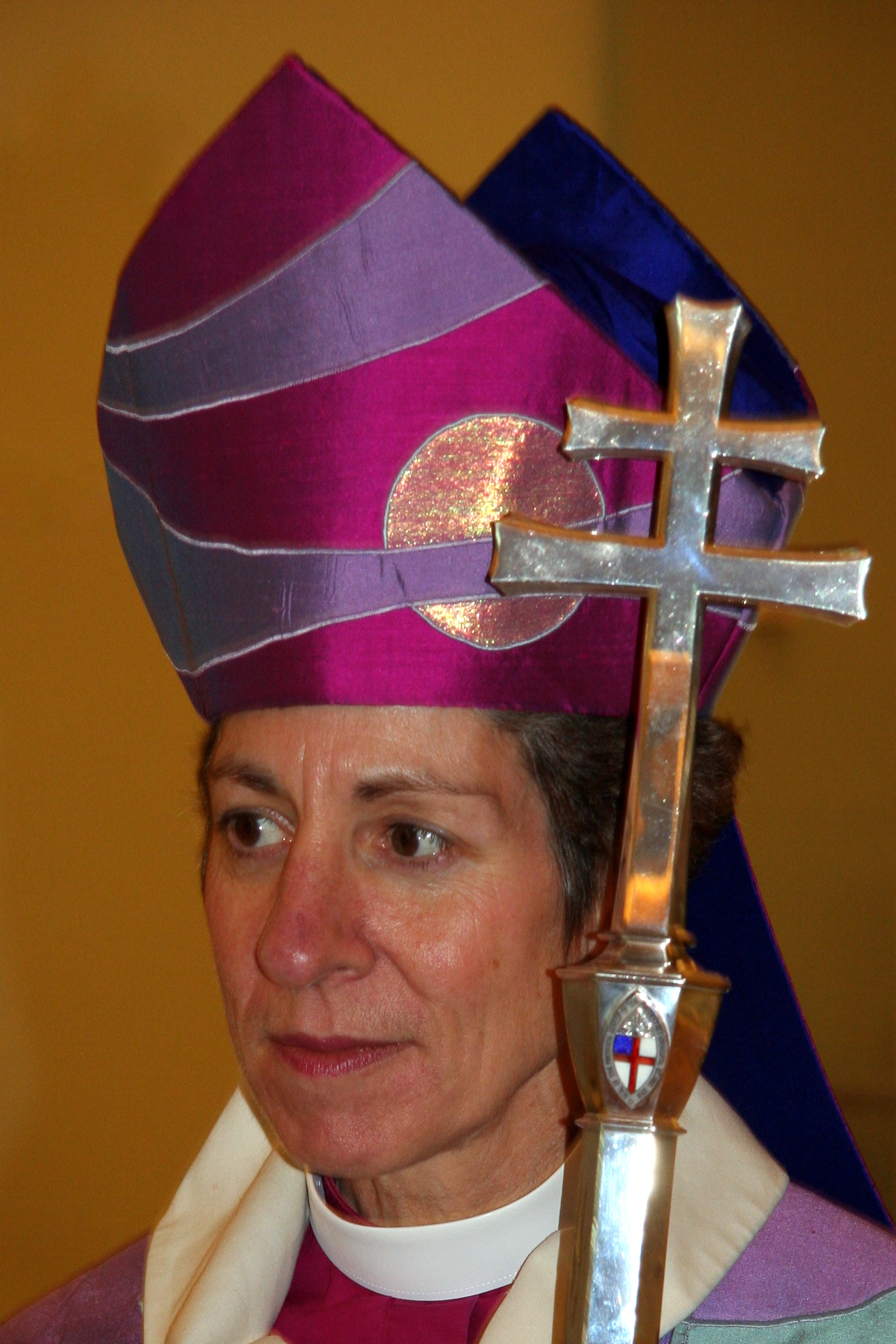
Gamaliel's principle has been used to support reforms such as the ordination of women.

Some Christians have argued that Gamaliel's principle should guide Christians when interacting with other religions or denominations, and that following it would avoid religious violence and intolerance. Raymond E. Brown argued that while "it may not be true that every religious movement that is of human origin fails; nevertheless, the church would have been wiser many times in its history if it had used Gamaliel's principle to judge new developments in Christianity rather than reacting in a hostile manner too quickly."

The Gamaliel principle has also sometimes been applied to changes or reforms, especially within the church, such as the ordination of women. Reginald Hoefer writes that "the Gamaliel Principle is a helpful lens through which to view all the things that might disturb us about the state of the world, the country, the Church" because it argues that what is right will win and anything that is wrong will lose.

Gamaliel's principle has also been compared to Jesus's admonition "You will know them by their fruits". Pat Boone used what he called "the Gamaliel attitude" to argue that church bodies should "judge the fruit before [making] any rash or rigid pronouncements".

=== Criticism ===
Some have argued that Gamaliel's principle is a fallacy. For instance, John F. MacArthur argued from an evangelical perspective that since evil is allowed to exist, "Gamaliel's principle will come true only when Christ returns to establish His kingdom on earth". MacArthur gives for an example that the Sanhedrin still existed in Israel at the time of Gamaliel even though it was "instrumental in Christ's death", and that therefore the only valid part of Gamaliel's argument is the second part: "If it be of God, ye cannot overthrow it". He concludes that the proper argument that Gamaliel should have used is not to "wait and see" but to study the scriptures.

One writer argued against the Gamaliel principle as applied to the ordination of women, saying that the time it would take to determine whether it was right would produce "profound and lasting damage to the Church". Beatrice Pate responded that this position demonstrates "a surprisingly low view of the Church, and a low view of the sovereignty of God."

== See also ==
- Historical reliability of the Acts of the Apostles
- Interfaith dialogue
- Ecumenism
