= Census of Quirinius =

Census of Judea taken by Publius Sulpicius Quirinius in 6

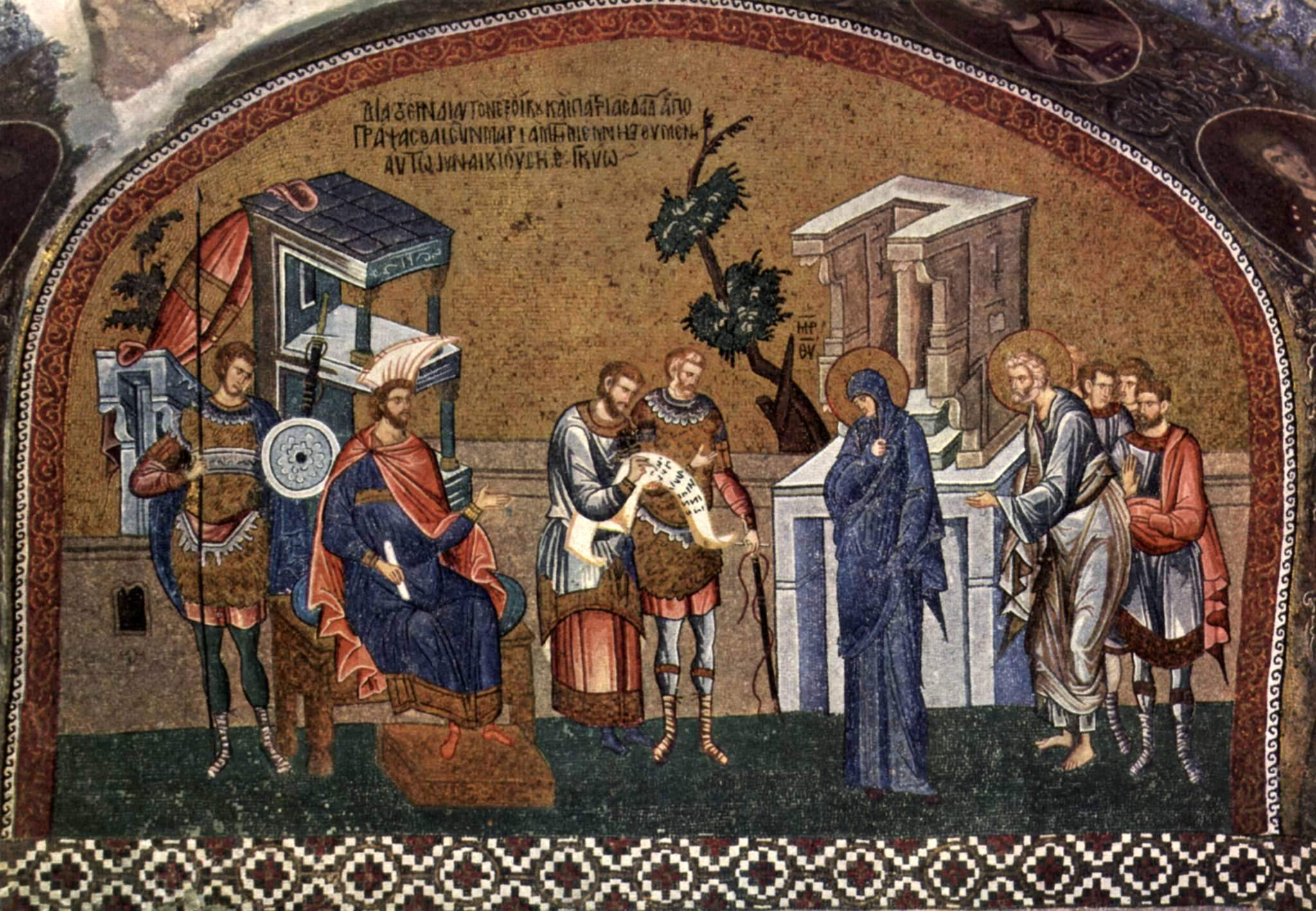
This Byzantine mosaic (c. 1315 CE, Chora Church, Istanbul) depicts Syrian governor Quirinius (seated, left) overseeing the census registration of Mary and Joseph (haloed, right).

The Census of Quirinius was a census of the Roman province of Judaea taken in 6 CE, upon its formation, by the governor of Roman Syria, Publius Sulpicius Quirinius. The census triggered a revolt of Jewish extremists (called Zealots) led by Judas of Galilee.

The Gospel of Luke uses the Census of Quirinius to date the birth of Jesus but also cites the time of Herod the Great (who died between 5 BCE and 1 CE), while the Gospel of Matthew only references Herod the Great. Most critical scholars agree that Luke is in error, while some religious scholars have attempted to defend the gospel, sometimes invoking unproven claims.

== Overview ==
Herod the Great (Herod I, c. 72 – 4 or 1 BCE) was a Roman client king whose territory included Judea. Upon his death, his kingdom was divided into four, each section ruled by a family member. In 6 CE, Emperor Augustus deposed Herod Archelaus, who had ruled the largest section (for a decade according to first-century Roman-Jewish historian Josephus), and converted his territory into the Roman province of Judaea.

In order to install an ad valorem property tax in the new province, Publius Sulpicius Quirinius, the legate (governor) of the province of Roman Syria starting in 6 CE, was assigned to carry out a census in Judaea. This would record the names of the owners of taxable property, along with its value, for which they would be taxed. Josephus states that Quirinius was sent to conduct the census and collect Archelaus's property 37 years after the Battle of Actium (31 BCE). The later historian Cassius Dio also recorded 6 CE as the start of Archelaus's exile.

The census triggered a revolt of Jewish extremists (called Zealots) led by Judas of Galilee. (Galilee itself was a separate territory under the rule of Herod Antipas.) Judas seems to have found the census objectionable because it ran counter to a biblical injunction (the traditional Jewish reading of Exodus 30:12) and because it would lead to taxes paid in heathen coins bearing an image of the emperor.

== Gospel of Luke ==
The Gospel of Matthew places Jesus' birth in the time of Herod the Great. This is affirmed by the Gospel of Luke (1:5–31), probably written around 80–90 CE, which then uses the census to date the birth (2:1–5): (Note: The earlier Gospel of Mark, probably a source for Matthew and Luke, contains no birth narrative.)

In those days a decree went out from Caesar Augustus that all the world should be registered. This was the first registration and was taken while Quirinius was governor of Syria. All went to their own towns to be registered. Joseph also went from the town of Nazareth in Galilee to Judea, to the city of David called Bethlehem, because he was descended from [David]. He went to be registered with Mary, to whom he was engaged and who was expecting a child.

Most critical biblical scholars agree that the Gospel of Luke is erroneous. Its author seems to have invoked the census as Joseph and Mary's motivation for departing "their own city" of Nazareth, Galilee, for Bethlehem. Additionally, the author may have wished to contrast Joseph and Mary's obedience to the Roman edict with the rebelliousness of the Zealots, and also to find a prophetic fulfilment of Psalm 87:6: "In the census of the peoples, [princes] will be born there." (Note: In place of the "princes" stated to be born in the Septuagint (Greek Old Testament), the English translation invokes the phrase "this one".) (Note: The Gospel of John portrays Christ's birth in Bethlehem as fulfilling a prophecy of Micah.) (Luke and Matthew also give different accounts of the family's departure from Bethlehem.) (Note: In Luke, Jesus's parents bring him first to Jerusalem and then to Nazareth. In Matthew, they go to Nazareth to avoid Judaea because of Archelaus's appointment (4 BCE), then flee to Egypt.) Catholic priest and biblical scholar Joseph Fitzmyer states:

It is clear that the census is a purely literary device used by him to associate Mary and Joseph, residents of Nazareth, with Bethlehem, the town of David, because he knows of a tradition, also attested in Matthew 2, that Jesus was also born in Bethlehem. He is also aware of a tradition about the birth of Jesus in the days of Herod, as is Matthew; Luke's form of the tradition, unlike Matthew's, tied the birth in a vague way to a time of political disturbance associated with a census.

Scholars point out that there was no single census of the entire Roman Empire under Augustus and the Romans did not directly tax client kingdoms; further, no Roman census required that people travel from their own homes to those of their ancestors. A census of Judaea would not have affected Joseph and his family, who lived in Galilee under a different ruler; the revolt of Judas of Galilee suggests that Rome's direct taxation of Judaea was new at the time. Catholic priest and biblical scholar Raymond E. Brown postulates that Judas's place of origin may have led the author of Luke to think that Galilee was subject to the census. (Note: Luke 3:1 distinguishes Galilee from Judaea.) Brown also points out that in the Acts of the Apostles, Luke the Evangelist (the traditional author of both books) dates Judas's census-incited revolt as following the rebellion of Theudas, which took place four decades later. (Note: Acts also depicts the revolt of Theudas being discussed ten years before it occurred.) (Note: Some Christian defenders have postulated that Acts was referring to a different Theudas from the one mentioned by Josephus.) Protestant theologian and biblical scholar E. P. Sanders concedes that, because revolts followed both Herod's death and the census, Luke's author may have "decided to elaborate the event [as] a reason for Joseph to travel ... to Bethlehem", calling this "a relatively slight historical error for an ancient author".

=== Attempted defences ===
The 2nd-century Christian apologist Justin Martyr claimed that the records of the census were still available and showed that Jesus was born in Bethlehem, but according to classical philologist Felix Scheidweiler this was a false assumption. Another Christian apologist, Tertullian (c. 155 – c. 220), suggested that Jesus' family was recorded in a census of Judaea conducted by Sentius Saturninus, the governor of Syria from 9–7 BCE.

In his 4th-century Ecclesiastical History, the Greek Christian bishop Eusebius dated the census to 3/2 BCE, conveniently agreeing with Luke 3:1 and 3:23 that Jesus was "about thirty" in the 15th year of Emperor Tiberius's reign.

The 5th-century theologian and historian Orosius refers to an Augustan census in which allegiance to the emperor was sworn, allegedly including the newborn Christ. Josephus refers to a similar census of the Jews (possibly occurring a year before Herod's death), which 6,000 Pharisees abstained from.

A number of modern scholars have attempted to defend Luke, which according to biblical scholar Géza Vermes contradicts historical fact, assuming that the gospel refers to the Census of Quirinius. Some conservative scholars have generally posited that an earlier census took place, invoking unproven claims. Historian Ralph Martin Novak explains that both Quirinius's career and the names and dates of the governors are well documented and there is no time before 6 CE when Quirinius could have served an earlier term as governor of Syria. Novak points out that such views spring from biblical inerrancy, the belief that the Bible is without error. Vermes describes attempts to defend the historicity of the biblical birth narratives as "exegetical acrobatics". The United States Conference of Catholic Bishops holds that the various attempts to resolve the difficulties have proved unsuccessful, suggesting that the author of Luke may have simply combined Jesus' birth in Bethlehem with the census for theological reasons, perhaps vaguely remembering that one was conducted by Quirinius.

Several unsubstantiated versions of the two-census hypothesis have been advanced by some conservative scholars. Paul Barnett, bishop and historian, theorizes that a census unrelated to taxation took place before Quirinius's tenure. In a 1984 article for the Journal of the Evangelical Theological Society (JETS), Wayne Brindle argues that the gospel's translation is ambiguous and thus refers to an earlier census held during Herod the Great's reign, as a result of the turbulent circumstances towards the end of his life; Brindle further argues that Quirinus held administrative power in the Syria region around that time, as part of a dual governorship with Gaius Sentius Saturninus, the former holding military and the latter political power. In a 2012 Perspectives on Science and Christian Faith article, James A. Nollet asserts that Quirinius served two terms as governor of Syria and took two censuses in Judea, the earlier one being a universal census by Augustus allegedly taken in 2 BCE. In 2021, Dominican scholar Anthony Giambrone called for "a more generous interpretation" of Luke to counter Augustan propaganda which purportedly could have been used to obscure a universal census of Roman regions conducted separately over a number of years.

In 1978, biblical scholar I. Howard Marshall argued in his commentary on the Greek text of Luke that instead of reading "This census was first made when Quirinius was governor" (emphasis added), the gospel should be read as saying, "This census took place before the one when Quirinius was governor"; (Note: These perspectives generally argue that the Greek word usually translated as first (πρώτη, prote) in this case should be read as before.) theological scholar Brook W. R. Pearson made similar arguments in 1999. Additionally, in 1995, hobbyist Bible scholar Colin Humphreys argued that such an interpretation could refer to a non-taxing census (mentioned by Orosius and possibly dated to Herod's last years by Josephus)—ostensibly aligning with a candidate for the Nativity story's Star of Bethlehem, a comet of 5 BCE noted in the Chinese Book of Han. In 2024, the Southeastern Baptist Theological Seminary argued that the gospel only mentions the well-known Census of Quirinius as a reference point and also that the word for 'governor' could be translated to an earlier post held by Quirinius.

In a 2011 JETS article, John H. Rhoads argues that Josephus's accounts of religious revolts by Judas of Galilee, one shortly after Herod's death and another in 6 CE, were both accidental duplications of an earlier revolt by "Judas son of the Sepphorean", whose execution Herod ordered. In the earliest account, the high priest is deposed and replaced by a Joazar, who is deposed once or twice in each of the other two stories.

Additionally, some writers state that in ancient literature, strict chronology is secondary to narrative coherence, and thus events could be excusably reordered. David J. Armitage claims Luke 3 as an example because it gives an overview of John the Baptist's ministry up to his imprisonment before discussing his baptism of Jesus. Armitage argues that Luke refers to the Census of Quirinius as a similar anachronistic digression, briefly flashing years forward from the Nativity before returning to it, (Note: Armitage proposes that the gospel could logically be rendered: The child grew and was strengthened in spirit, and he was in the wilderness until the day of his public appearance to Israel. As it happens, it was during that time that a decree went out from Caesar Augustus to register all the Roman world (this was the first registration, when Quirinius was governor of Syria), and everyone went – each into their own town – to be registered. Joseph also went up: out of Galilee, away from the town of Nazareth, into Judea, to David's town (which is called Bethlehem) because he was from the house and family of David; he went to be registered with Mary (she who was his betrothed when she was pregnant). Now, it transpired that the days were completed for her to give birth when they were in that place, and she gave birth to her firstborn son ...) with the confusion ostensibly stemming from the author's "overly generous estimation of the historical literacy of his readers".

== Gallery ==
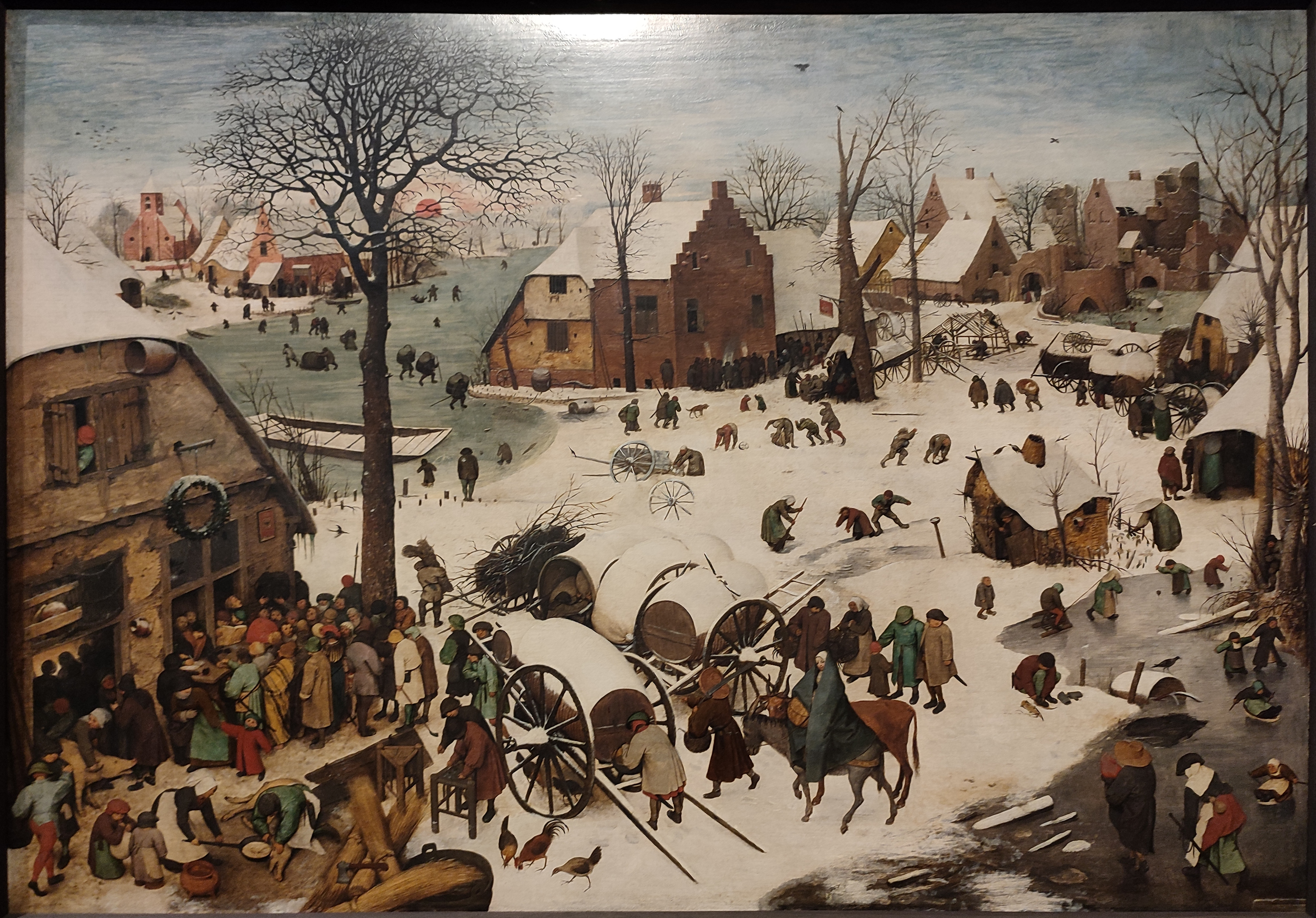
Pieter Bruegel the Elder, The Census at Bethlehem (1566), oil on wood panel, Royal Museums of Fine Arts of Belgium

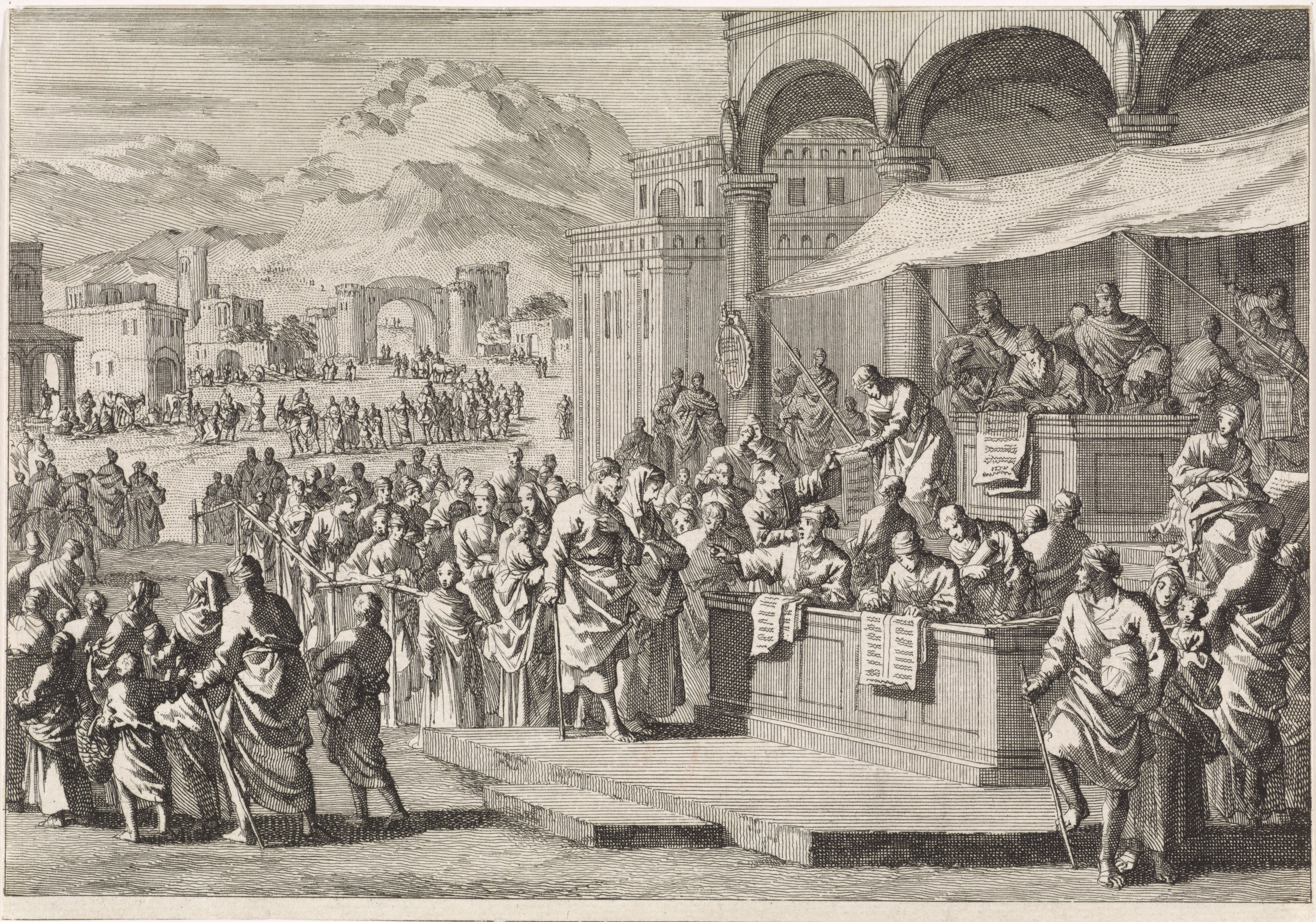
Jan Luyken, Joseph and Mary taking the census (1700), etching and book print, Haarlem, Netherlands

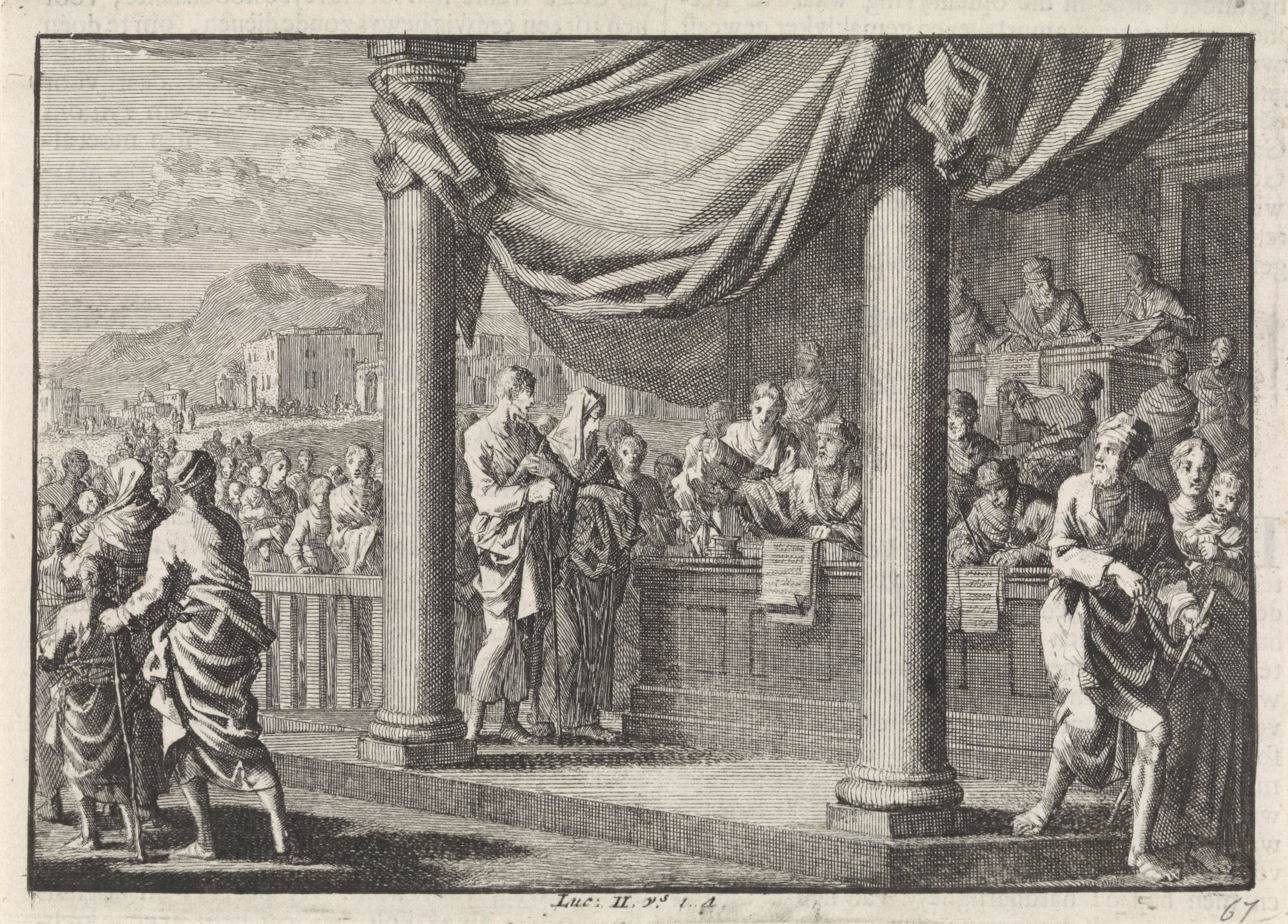
Jan Luyken, Joseph and Mary taking the census (1703), etching and book print, Haarlem, Netherlands

== See also ==
- Anno Domini
- Birth registration in ancient Rome
- Chronology of Jesus
- Date of the birth of Jesus
- Gospel harmony
- Historicity of Jesus
- List of Roman governors of Syria
- Roman administration of Judaea (AD 6–135)
- Roman censor
- Stele of Quintus Aemilius Secundus
