= Battle of Sepphoris =

Battle of Sepphoris may refer to one of the following battles or sieges taking place near the village of Sepphoris:

- Conquest of Sepphoris by Roman client king Herod the Great in 37 BCE, after it had been garrisoned by the Parthian proxy, the Hasmonean Antigonus II Mattathias
- Destruction of Sepphoris (4 BCE), during first rebellion of Judas of Galilee
- Destruction of Sepphoris (6), during second rebellion of Judas of Galilee
- Siege of Sepphoris (66), during Gallus's campaign in the First Jewish–Roman War
- Siege of Sepphoris (67), siege by Judean Free Government rebels against pro-Roman loyalists in the First Jewish–Roman War
- Battle of Sepphoris (352), when the city (Diocaesarea) was razed during the Jewish revolt against Constantius Gallus
- Occupation of Sepphoris by Arab armies in 634
