= Quirinius =

Roman legate, consul and governor of Syria (c. 51 BC – AD 21)

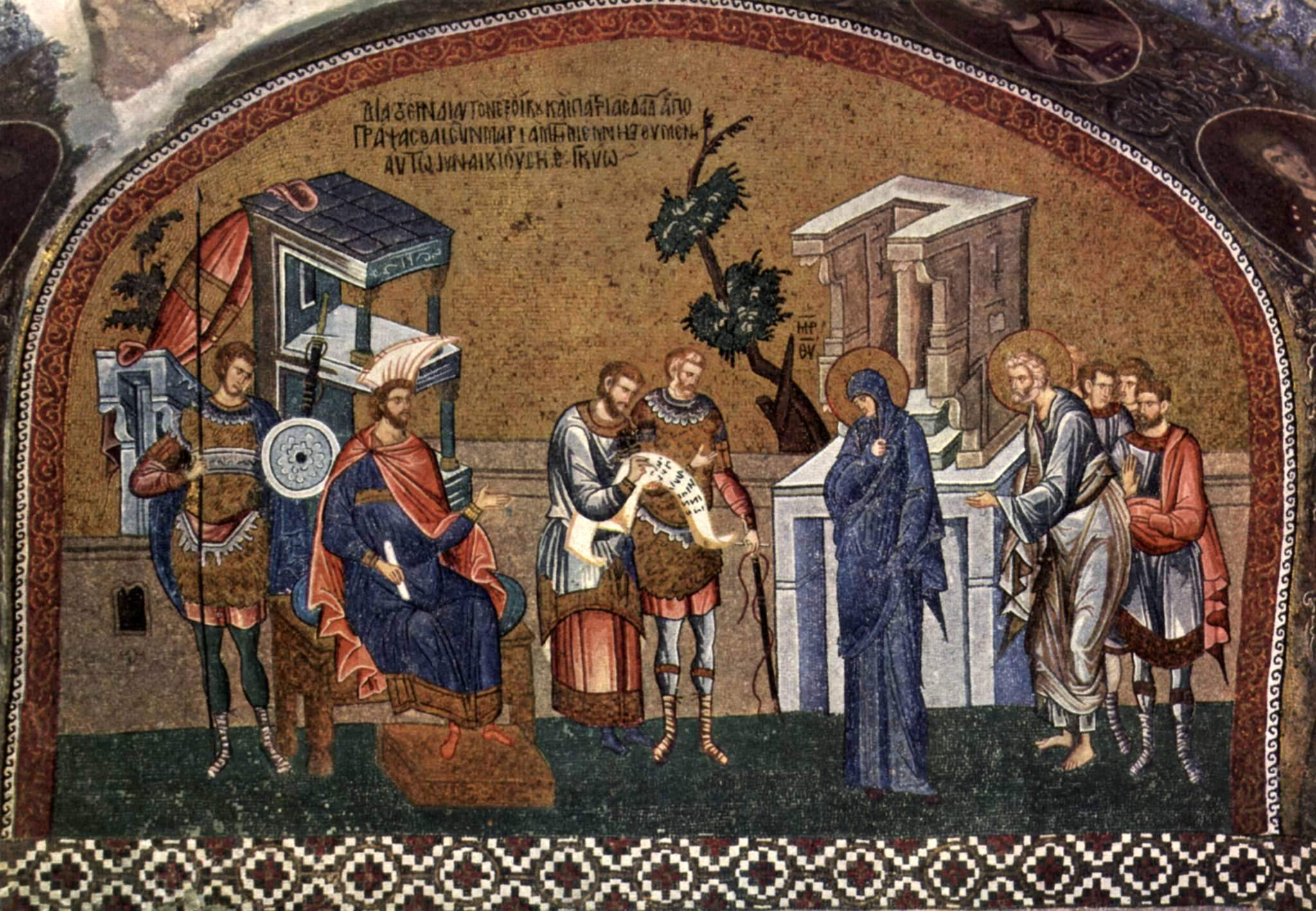
Mary and Joseph register for the census before Governor Quirinius. Byzantine mosaic at the Chora Church, Constantinople 1315–1320.

Publius Sulpicius Quirinius (c. 51 BC – AD 21), also translated as Cyrenius, was a Roman aristocrat. After the banishment of the ethnarch Herod Archelaus from the tetrarchy of Judea in AD 6, Quirinius was appointed legate governor of Syria, to which the province of Judaea had been added for census purposes.

== Life ==
Quirinius was born into an undistinguished family in Lanuvium, a Latin town near Rome. He was the son of Publius Sulpicius Quirinius and the paternal grandson of Publius Sulpicius Quirinius of Gens Sulpicia. Quirinius followed the normal path of service for an ambitious young man of his social class. According to the Roman historian Florus, Quirinius defeated the Marmaridae, a tribe of desert raiders from Cyrenaica, around 14 BC (possibly while governor of Crete and Cyrene), but declined the honorific name "Marmaricus". In 12 BC, he was named consul, a sign that he had Augustus's favor.

Around 5–3 BC, he led a campaign (probably as legate of Galatia) against the Homanades (Homonadenses), a tribe based in the mountainous region of Galatia and Cilicia. He won by reducing their strongholds and starving out the defenders. For this victory, he was awarded a triumph and elected duumvir by the colony of Antioch of Pisidia.

By 1 AD, Quirinius was appointed as tutor to Augustus' grandson Gaius Caesar until the latter died from wounds suffered on campaign. When Augustus' support shifted to his stepson Tiberius, Quirinius also changed allegiance to Tiberius. Quirinius's marriage to Claudia Appia, about whom little is known, ended in divorce. Around 3 AD, he married Aemilia Lepida, daughter of Quintus Aemilius Lepidus and sister of Manius Aemilius Lepidus. Lepida had originally been betrothed to Lucius Caesar. Within a few years, Quirinius and Lepida were divorced. In 20 AD, he accused her of falsely claiming that he fathered her son, and later, of trying to poison him during their marriage. Tacitus claims that Lepida was popular with the public, who regarded Quirinius's prosecution of her as spiteful.

After the banishment of Herod Archelaus in 6 AD, Judaea (the conglomeration of Samaria, Judea and Idumea) came under direct Roman administration, with Coponius appointed as prefect. At the same time, Quirinius was appointed Legate of Syria, with instructions to assess Judea Province for taxation purposes. One of his first duties was to carry out a census.

The Jews already hated their pagan conquerors, and censuses were forbidden under Jewish law. The Jews greatly resented this taxation assessment, and open revolt was prevented only by the high priest Joazar. Despite efforts to prevent revolt, the census triggered the revolt of Judas of Galilee and the formation of the party of the Zealots, according to Josephus and Luke in the Acts of the Apostles.

There is a reference to Quirinius in the Gospel of Luke chapter 2, which mentions the birth of Jesus alongside a reference to the Census of Quirinius. This is widely held to contradict the time of Jesus' birth described in the Gospel of Matthew as during the reign of Herod the Great, as Herod died in the year 4 BC. According to this view, the reference to the census of Quirinius is inconsistent with Luke chapter 1, which states that Herod is still alive about a year before Jesus's birth. Most critical scholars judge Luke to be inconsistent with the historical evidence.

Quirinius served as governor of Syria with authority over Judaea until 12 AD, when he returned to Rome as a close associate of Tiberius. Nine years later, he died and was given a public funeral.

== Archaeology ==
The earliest known mention of Quirinius is an inscription from 14 AD, discovered in Antioch Pisidia, known as Res Gestae Divi Augusti ('The Deeds of the Divine Augustus'), which states: "A great crowd of people came together from all over Italy to my election, ... when Publius Sulpicius (Quirinius) and Gaius Valgius were consuls." Two other inscriptions from the same site (Inscriptiones Latinae Selectae 9502–9503) mentioned Quirinius as a duumvir in 3 AD, while Marcus Servilius was a Roman consul.

Quirinius's position as governor of Syria has been validated by the discovery of coins issued by his administration there, inscribed with "the 36th year of Caesar [Augustus]" (5/6 AD counted from the Battle of Actium). The census he conducted in Syria has been validated by an inscription on the Stele of Quintus Aemilius Secundus, purchased in Beirut in 1674 and brought to Venice. The stele commemorates a Roman officer who had served under Quirinius, stating, among other achievements: "By order of the same Quirinius I took a census of the city of Apamea".

== Historical accounts ==
The Roman historian Tacitus wrote in his Annals Book III that when Quirinius died in 21 AD, Tiberius Caesar "requested that the Senate pay tribute ... with a public funeral", and described him as a "tireless soldier, who had by his faithful services become consul during the reign of Augustus, ... [and] later was appointed to be an adviser to Caius Caesar in the government of Armenia ..." The Jewish historian Josephus wrote in more detail about the census of Judea that Quirinius oversaw as governor of Syria around 6 AD.

== See also ==
- Sulpicia (gens)
- Census of Quirinius
- List of biblical figures identified in extra-biblical sources

== Bibliography ==
- Brown, R.E. (1977). The Birth of the Messiah: A Commentary on the Infancy Narratives in Matthew and Luke. Doubleday & Company.

Political offices
Preceded by Tiberius Claudius Nero, and Publius Quinctilius Varus	Consul of the Roman Empire; 12 BC with Marcus Valerius Messalla Appianus	Succeeded by Lucius Volusius Saturninus as Suffect consul
