= Zealots =

Jewish nationalist faction in Roman Judaea

Zealots קנאים (Hebrew)
- Leader: The "Fourth Philosophy"; Judas of Galilee; The Zealots; Eleazar ben Simon; The Sicarii; Menahem ben Judah; Eleazar ben Yair; Related factions; John of Giscala; Simon bar Giora
- Founded: 6 CE
- Dissolved: 73 CE (First Jewish–Roman War)
- Ideology: Jewish nationalism Jewish theocracy Jewish fundamentalism
- Religion: Second Temple Judaism

The Zealots were members of a Jewish political movement during the Second Temple period who sought to incite the people of Judaea to rebel against the Roman Empire and expel it from the Land of Israel by force of arms, most notably during the First Jewish–Roman War. "Zealotry" was the term used by the Jewish historian Josephus for a "fourth sect" or "fourth Jewish philosophy" during this period.

At the core of Zealotry was the Jewish concept of "zeal", a total commitment to God's will and law, which was epitomized by the biblical figures of Phinehas and Elijah, and the Hasmonean priest, Mattathias. Zealotry was also driven by a belief in Israel's election by God, and is often seen as a key driver of the First Jewish Revolt.

Eleazar ben Simon's faction is the only group to have explicitly adopted the title of "Zealots", though the term has since been applied to other rebel factions as well. The Sicarii, another radical group active during the First Jewish Revolt, are widely recognized by scholars as a distinct and rival faction, though one that shared significant similarities with the Zealots. Led by descendants of Judas of Galilee, founder of the Fourth Philosophy, the Sicarii, as noted by scholars like Martin Hengel, adhered to many of the same principles as the Zealots, including a "theocratic ideal" and a deep commitment to the concept of "zeal".

== Etymology ==
The term zealot, the common translation of the Hebrew kanai (קנאי, frequently used in plural form, קנאים, kana'im), means one who is zealous on behalf of God. The term derives from Greek ζηλωτής (zēlōtēs), "emulator, zealous admirer or follower".

== History ==
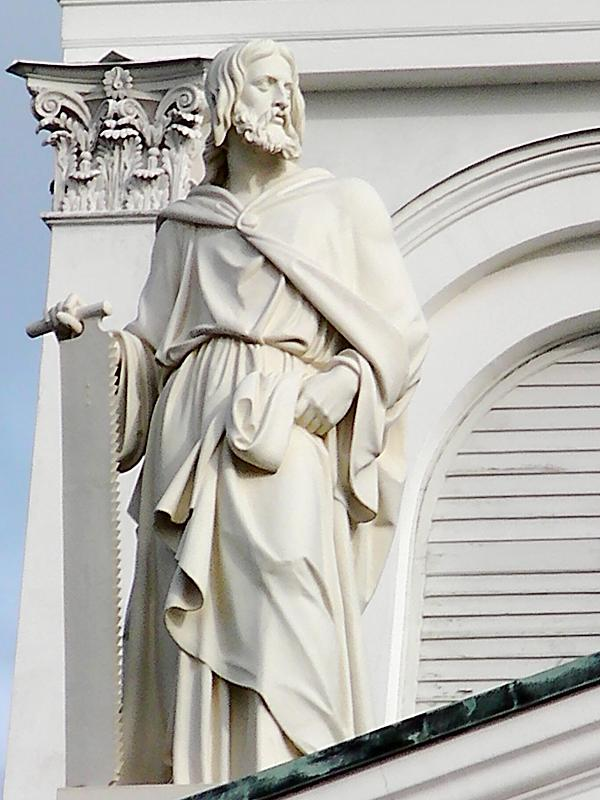
Statue of Simon the Zealot by Hermann Schievelbein at the roof of the Helsinki Cathedral.

Flavius Josephus' Jewish Antiquities states that there were three main Jewish sects at this time, the Pharisees, the Sadducees, and the Essenes. The Zealots were a "fourth sect", founded by Judas of Galilee (also called Judas of Gamala) in 6 CE against the Census of Quirinius, shortly after the Roman Empire declared what had most recently been the tetrarchy of Herod Archelaus to be a Roman province. According to Josephus, they "agree in all other things with the Pharisaic notions; but they have an inviolable attachment to liberty, and say that God is to be their only Ruler and Lord." (18.1.6)

According to the Jewish Encyclopedia article on Zealots:

Judah of Gaulanitis is regarded as the founder of the Zealots, who are identified as the proponents of the Fourth Philosophy. In the original sources, however, no such identification is anywhere clearly made, and the question is hardly raised of the relationship between the Sicarii, the upholders of the Fourth Philosophy, and the Zealots. Josephus himself in his general survey of the various groups of freedom fighters (War 7:268–70) enumerates the Sicarii first, whereas he mentions the Zealots last.

Others have also argued that the group was not so clearly marked out (before the first war of 66–70/73) as some have thought.

Simon the Zealot was listed among the apostles selected by Jesus in the Gospel of Luke and in the Acts of the Apostles. He is called Cananaean in Mark and Matthew (Matthew 10, Matthew 10:4, Mark 3,Mark 3:18). Two of Judas of Galilee's sons, Jacob and Simon, were involved in a revolt and were executed by Tiberius Alexander, the procurator of Iudaea province from 46 to 48.

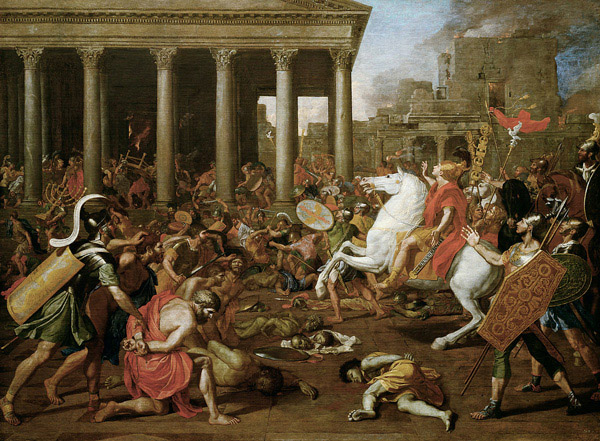
Destruction of the Temple in Jerusalem by Titus, painting by Nicolas Poussin, oil on canvas, 148 x 199 cm, 1635, Kunsthistorisches Museum in Vienna

The Zealots took a leading role in the First Jewish–Roman War (66–73 CE), as they objected to Roman rule and violently sought to eradicate it by indiscriminately attacking Romans and Greeks. Another group, likely related, were the Sicarii, who raided Jewish settlements and killed Jews they considered apostates and collaborators, while also urging Jews to fight the Romans and other Jews for the cause. Josephus paints a very bleak picture of their activities as they instituted what he characterized as a murderous "reign of terror" prior to the Jewish Temple's destruction. According to Josephus, the Zealots followed John of Gischala, who had fought the Romans in Galilee, escaped, came to Jerusalem, and then inspired the locals to a fanatical position that led to the Temple's destruction. They succeeded in taking over Jerusalem and held it until 70, when the son of Roman Emperor Vespasian, Titus (Flavian dynasty), retook the city and destroyed Herod's Temple during the destruction of Jerusalem.

=== Talmudic descriptions ===
In the Talmud, the Zealots are characterized as non-religious, that is not following the contemporary religious leadership. They are called the Biryonim (בריונים) meaning "boorish", "wild", or "ruffians", and are condemned for their aggression, their unwillingness to compromise to save the survivors of besieged Jerusalem, and their blind militarism in opposition to the rabbis' desire to seek a peace treaty with Rome. However, according to one body of tradition, the rabbis initially supported the revolt until the Zealots instigated a civil war, at which point all hope of resisting the Romans was deemed impossible.

The Zealots are further blamed for having contributed to the demise of Jerusalem and the Herod's Temple, and of ensuring Rome's retribution and stranglehold on Judea. According to the Babylonian Talmud, Gittin:56b, the Biryonim destroyed decades' worth of food and firewood in besieged Jerusalem to force the Jews to fight the Romans out of desperation. This event precipitated the escape of Johanan ben Zakai and his meeting with Vespasian, which led to the foundation of the Council of Jamnia and the composition of the Mishnah, ensuring the survival of rabbinical Judaism.

== Ideology ==
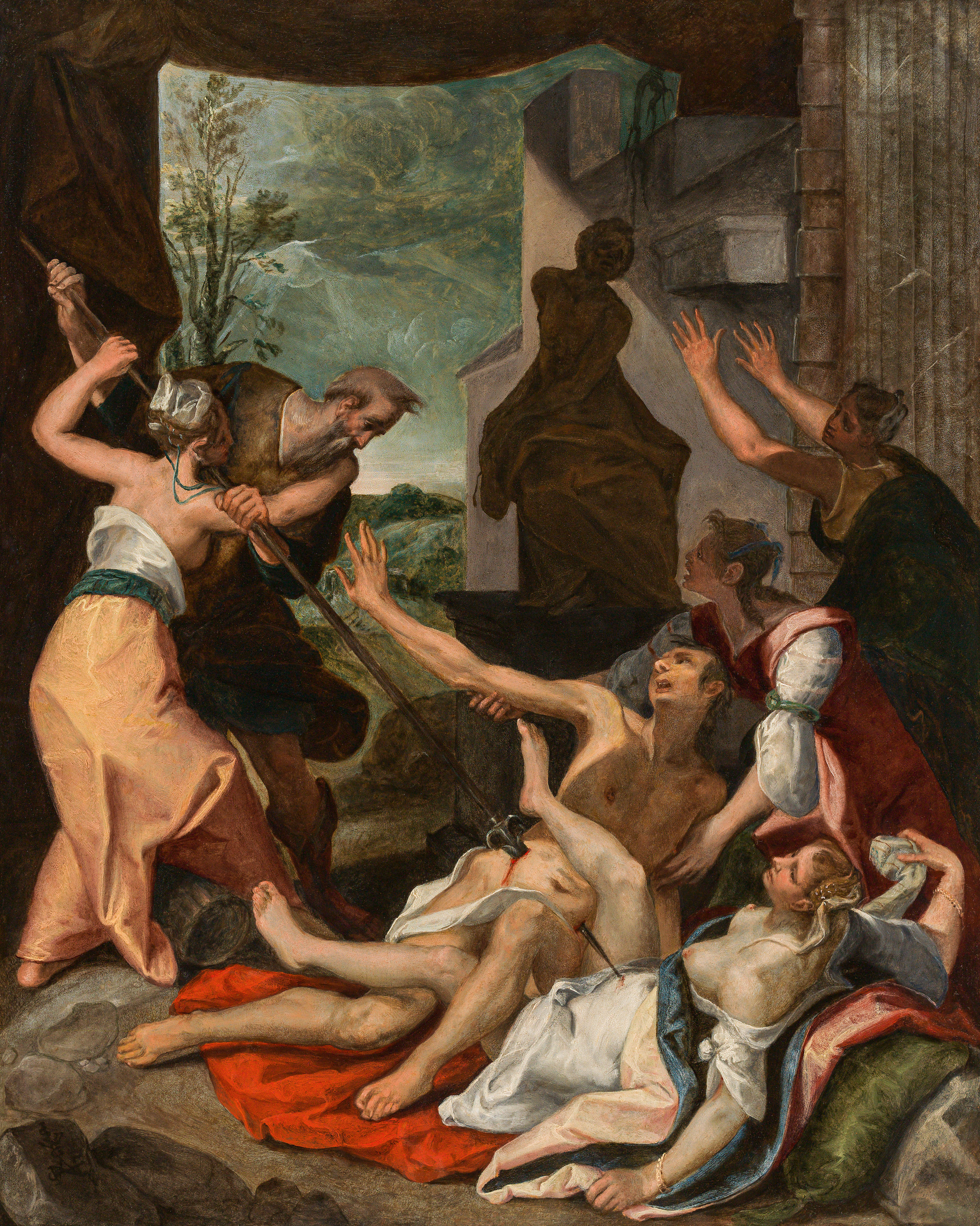
Phinehas, who in the Torah killed an Israelite man and a Midianite woman for engaging in immoral acts, is seen as a central model for ancient Jewish zealotry

At the core of Zealotry was the Jewish concept of "zeal," a total commitment to God's will and law. This concept drew on earlier figures associated with zealotry found in the Hebrew Bible. Perhaps the most authoritative role model for zealotry was Phinehas, the grandson of Aaron and the son of Eleazar, whose story is found in the Torah. His act of zeal is described in Numbers 25:1–15, where he impales an Israelite man, Zimri, and a Midianite woman, Cozbi, who were engaged in a sexual act, thereby halting the divine plague brought upon Israel for its sins. His enforcement of God's covenant through military means made him a central figure in the ideological framework of Zealotry. His role as a priest amplified his influence within priestly circles; his zeal was used to justify the legitimacy of the Hasmonean dynasty, which invoked Phinehas' zeal to support their usurpation of the high priesthood from the descendants of Zadok.

Other figures associated with zealotry include the biblical prophet Elijah and Hasmonean priest Mattathias. Elijah, in 1 Kings 19, refers to himself as "zealous" when speaking to God after killing the worshippers of Ba'al. Mattathias, the Hasmonean patriarch who helped spark the Maccabean revolt in the 2nd century BCE, is celebrated for killing a Jew who agreed to make a pagan sacrifice, as well as the Greek official who ordered it. He is portrayed in 1 Maccabees as a latter-day Phinehas; according to the text, he "had burned with zeal for the law, just as Phineas did against Zimri, the son of Salu".

Zealotry was also driven by a belief in Israel's election by God.

While "zeal of the Torah" does not necessarily imply resistance to Roman rule, as noted by New Testament scholar Richard Horsley, Zealot ideas can nonetheless be seen as a key driver of the First Jewish Revolt. Judaic scholar Philip Alexander sees the common goal connecting all Zealot factions as 'freeing Israel from Roman rule by force.'.

== Sicarii ==
The Sicarii were a splinter group of the Jewish Zealots who, in the decades preceding Jerusalem's destruction in 70 CE, strongly opposed the Roman occupation of Judea and attempted to expel them and their sympathizers from the area. Their leader in the early stages of the revolt was Menahem ben Judah, a descendant of Judah of Galilee. The Sicarii carried sicae, or small daggers, concealed in their cloaks. At public gatherings, they pulled out these daggers to attack Romans and alleged Roman sympathizers alike, blending into the crowd after the deed to escape detection.

According to historian Hayim Hillel Ben-Sasson, the Sicarii, originally based in Galilee, "were fighting for a social revolution, while the Jerusalem Zealots placed less stress on the social aspect", and the Sicarii "never attached themselves to one particular family and never proclaimed any of their leaders king". Both groups objected to the way the priestly families were running the Temple.

Historian Jonathan Price argues that the Zealots were initially part of the broader Sicarii movement, which may have been known by a different name in its earlier stages. He suggests that the Zealots, along with possibly other splinter factions, broke away from the Sicarii in a hostile manner as tensions escalated with the onset of the First Jewish Revolt. According to Price, both groups likely believed they were fulfilling the true intentions of the movement's founders, despite the Sicarii having "dynastic legitimacy". The murder of Menahem and the expulsion of many of his followers in 66 CE, Price argues, was part of a broader struggle for control over the revolution in Jerusalem. Judaic scholar Philip Alexander describes the Sicarii as a loose coalition of Jewish nationalists, united by the goal of expelling Roman rule through force.

== Aftermath ==
Zealotry did not fade away immediately after the First Jewish Revolt but instead found new expressions in later uprisings. In the early 70s, the Zealot mindset continued to drive Jewish resistance, first in Egypt and later in Cyrenaica. In Alexandria, Sicarii activists sought to incite rebellion, but their efforts were quickly quelled by local Jewish leadership, who acted to prevent further conflict with Rome. A similar Sicarii attempt to stir unrest occurred in Cyrenaica, where a figure named Jonathan led a group into the desert, promising signs of divine intervention, but was likewise suppressed by Roman forces after the leadership alerted them to the threat.

Philip Alexander writes that the persistence of Zealot ideas laid the groundwork for later Jewish revolts, including the diaspora uprisings in 115 CE and the Bar Kokhba revolt in 132 CE.

== Affiliation with Paul the Apostle ==
While most English translations of the Bible render the Greek word zelotes in Acts 22:3 and Galatians 1:13–14 and Philippians 3:5–6 of the New Testament as the adjective "zealous", an article by Mark R. Fairchild takes it to mean a Zealot and suggests that Paul the Apostle may have been a Zealot, which might have been the driving force behind his persecution of the Christians (see the stoning of Saint Stephen) before his conversion to Christianity, and the incident at Antioch, even after his conversion. While Paul was not formally part of the Zealot movement—focused on violent resistance to Roman rule, his pre-conversion actions reflect a similar fervor for preserving Jewish purity and traditions. This zeal may also explain his later confrontations, such as the incident at Antioch, even after his conversion.

In the two cited verses Paul literally declares himself as one who is loyal to God, or an ardent observer of the Law according to the Douay-Rheims of Acts 22:3, but the relationship of Paul the Apostle and Jewish Christianity is still debated. This does not necessarily prove Paul was revealing himself as a Zealot. The Modern King James Version of Jay P. Green renders it as 'a zealous one'. Two modern translations (the Jewish New Testament and Alternate Literal Translation) render it as 'a zealot'. The Unvarnished New Testament (1991) renders Galatians 1:14 as "being an absolute zealot for the traditions".

== See also ==
- S. G. F. Brandon
- Eifert
- Knanaya
- Sicarii (1989), a modern group inspired by the Sicarii
- Sikrikim, a modern group inspired by the Sicarii
- Simon the Zealot
- Zealot: The Life and Times of Jesus of Nazareth, a book about the life of Jesus by Reza Aslan
- Zealots of Piety
- Zealots of Thessalonica
- Zeal of the convert
