= Gamaliel =

First century leading authority on Jewish law in the Sanhedrin

Rabban Gamaliel
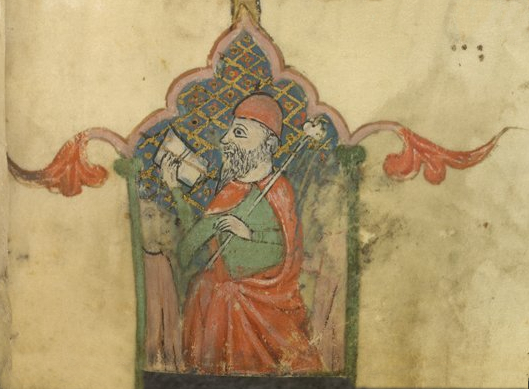
- Gamaliel depicted in a medieval miniature
- Title: Nasi

Personal life
- Children: 2, including Simeon ben Gamliel
- Parent: Simeon ben Hillel (father)

Religious life
- Religion: Judaism

Gamaliel the Elder (/ɡəˈmeɪliəl, -ˈmɑː-, ˌɡæməˈliːəl/; also spelled Gamliel; Hebrew: רַבַּן גַּמְלִיאֵל הַזָּקֵן Rabban Gamliʾēl haz-Zāqēn; Koine Greek: Γαμαλιὴλ ὁ Πρεσβύτερος Gamaliēl ho Presbýteros), or Rabban Gamaliel I, was a leading authority in the Sanhedrin in the early first century AD. He was the son of Simeon ben Hillel and grandson of the great Jewish teacher Hillel the Elder. He fathered Simeon ben Gamliel, who was named for Gamaliel's father, and a daughter, who married a priest named Simon ben Nathanael.

In the Christian tradition, Gamaliel is recognized as a Pharisaic doctor of Jewish Law. Gamaliel was named as a member of the Sanhedrin in Acts 5 and the teacher of Paul the Apostle in Acts 22:3. Gamaliel encouraged his fellow Pharisees to show leniency to the apostles of Jesus in Acts 5:34.

== In Jewish tradition ==
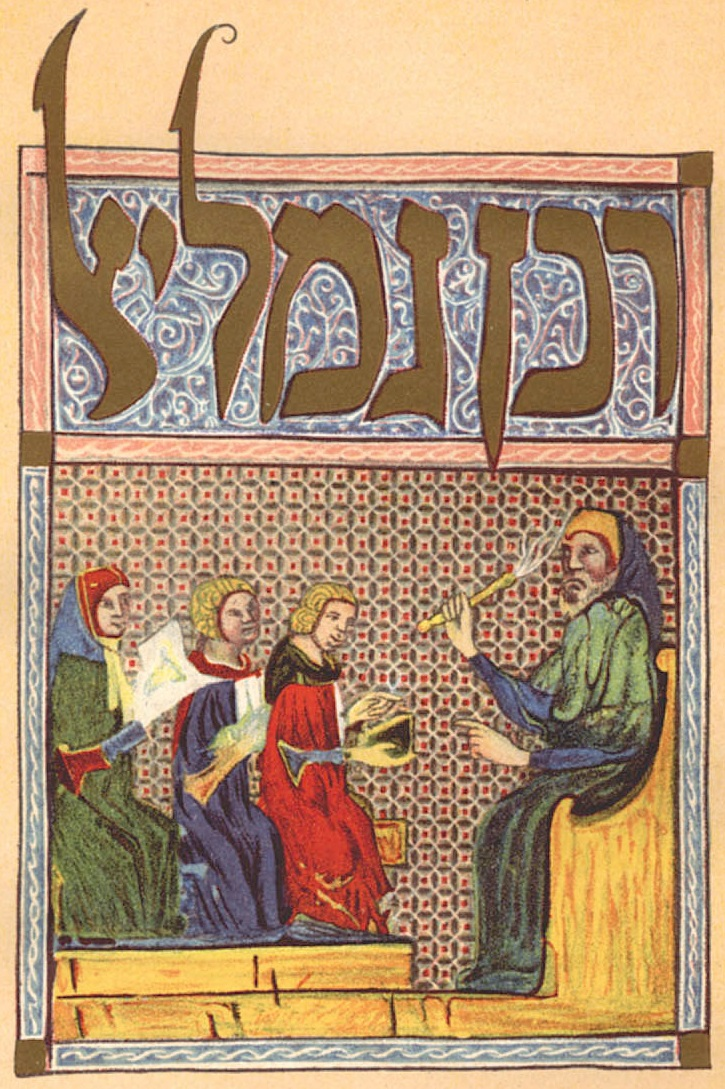
Rabban Gamaliel (רבן גמליﭏ)

In the Talmud, Gamaliel is described as bearing the titles Nasi (Hebrew: נָשִׂיא Nāśīʾ "prince") and Rabban ("our master") as the president of the Great Sanhedrin in Jerusalem; it is not doubted that he held a senior position in the highest court in Jerusalem. Gamaliel holds a reputation in the Mishnah for being one of the greatest teachers in all the annals of Judaism: "Since Rabban Gamaliel the Elder died, there has been no more reverence for the law, and purity and piety died out at the same time".

Gamaliel's authority on questions of religious law is suggested by two Mishnaic anecdotes in which "the king and queen" ask for his advice about rituals. The identity of the king and queen in question is not given, but is generally thought to either be Herod Agrippa and his wife Cypros the Nabataean, or Herod Agrippa II and his sister Berenice.

As rabbinic literature always contrasts the school of Hillel the Elder to that of Shammai and only presents the collective opinions of each of these opposing schools of thought without mentioning the individual nuances and views of the rabbis within them, these texts do not portray Gamaliel as being knowledgeable about the Jewish scriptures, nor do they describe him as a teacher. For this reason, Gamaliel is not listed as part of the chain of individuals who perpetuated the Mishnaic tradition. Instead, the chain is listed as passing directly from Hillel to Yohanan ben Zakkai.

Nevertheless, the Mishnah mentions Gamaliel's authorship of a few laws about community welfare and conjugal rights. He argued that the law should protect women during divorce and that, for the purpose of remarriage, a single witness was sufficient evidence for the death of a husband.

Various pieces of classical rabbinic literature additionally mention that Gamaliel sent out three epistles, designed as notifications of new religious rulings, and which portray Gamaliel as the head of the Jewish body for religious law. Two of these three were sent, respectively, to the inhabitants of Galilee and "the Darom" (southern Judea), and were on the subject of the first tithe. The third epistle was sent to the Jews of the diaspora and argued for the introduction of an intercalary month.

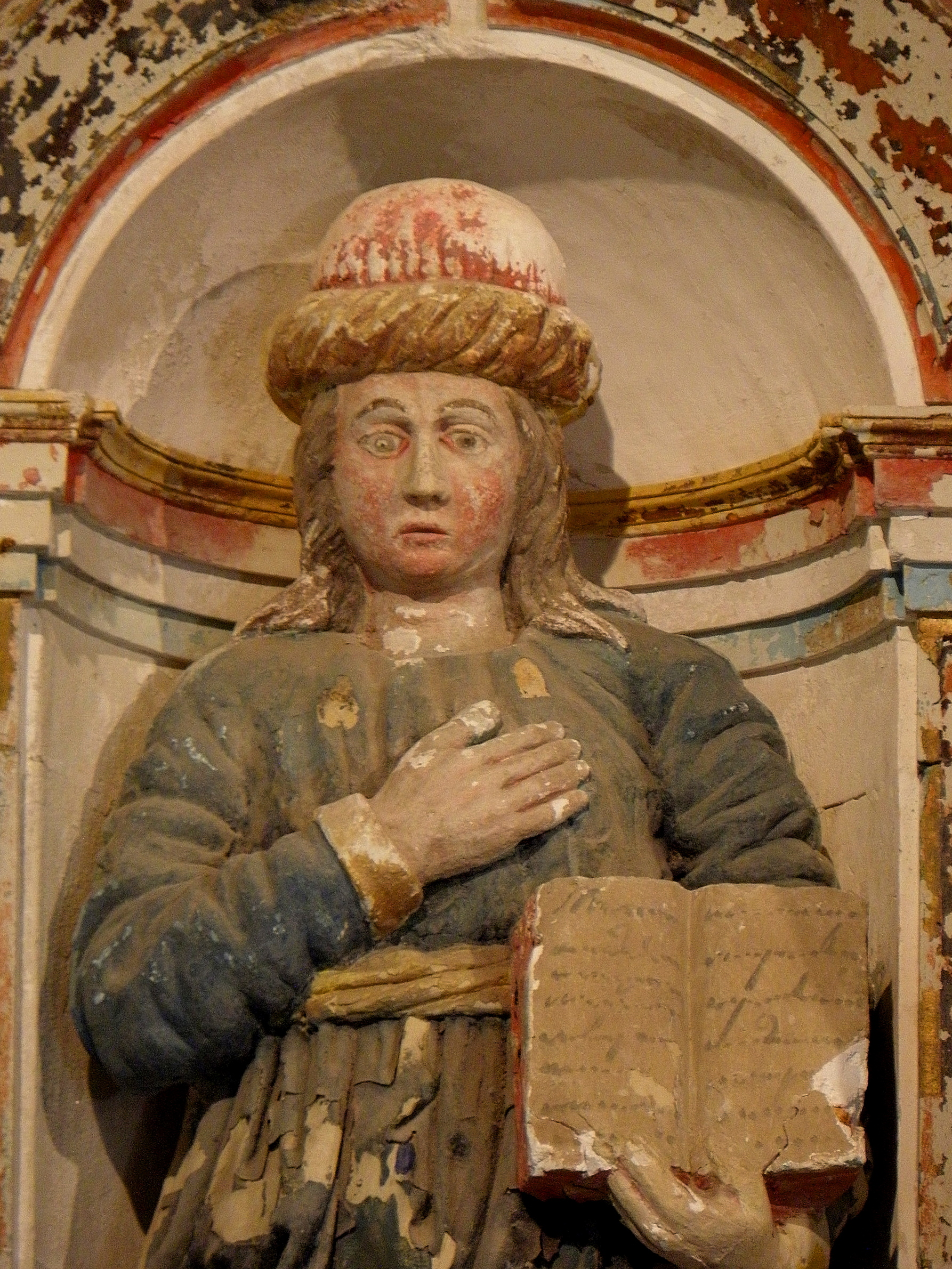
Statue of Gamaliel in the Chapelle Saint-Nicodème de Pluméliau.

Since the Hillelian school of thought is presented collectively, very few other teachings are clearly identifiable as Gamaliel's. There is only a cryptic dictum comparing his students to classes of fish:

A ritually impure fish: one who has memorized everything by study, but has no understanding, and is the son of poor parents
A ritually pure fish: one who has learnt and understood everything, and is the son of rich parents
A fish from the Jordan River: one who has learnt everything, but doesn't know how to respond
A fish from the Mediterranean Sea: one who has learnt everything, and knows how to respond

In some manuscripts of Dunash ibn Tamim's tenth-century Hebrew commentary on the Sefer Yetzirah, the author identifies Gamaliel with the physician Galen. He claims to have seen an Arabic medical work translated from Hebrew entitled The Book of Gamaliel the Prince (Nasi), called Galenos among the Greeks. However, since Galen lived in the second century and Gamaliel died during the mid-first century, this is unlikely.

=== Quotes ===
In Pirkei Avot, Gamaliel is credited as saying:

Make a teacher for yourself and remove yourself from doubt; and do not excessively tithe by estimation.

== In the New Testament and in Apocrypha ==
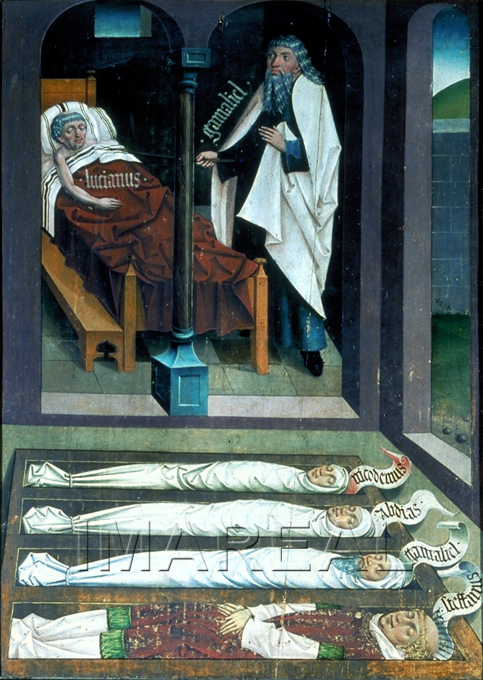
Gamaliel appearing to the priest Lucianus in a dream. 15th-century painting.

The Acts of the Apostles introduces Gamaliel as a Pharisee and celebrated doctor of the Mosaic Law in Acts 5:34–40. In the larger context (vs.17–42), Peter and the other apostles are described as being prosecuted before the Sanhedrin for continuing to preach the gospel despite the Jewish authorities having previously prohibited it. The passage describes Gamaliel presenting an argument against executing the apostles, reminding them of the earlier revolts of Theudas and Judas of Galilee, which collapsed quickly after the deaths of those individuals. Gamaliel's advice was accepted after his concluding argument:

And now I say unto you, Refrain from these men, and let them alone: for if this counsel or this work be of men, it will come to nought: But if it be of God, ye cannot overthrow it; lest haply ye be found even to fight against God.

— Acts 5:38–39

The Book of Acts later goes on to describe Paul the Apostle recounting that though "born in Tarsus", he was brought up in Jerusalem "at the feet of Gamaliel, [and] taught according to the perfect manner of the law of the fathers" (Acts 22:3). No details are given about which teachings Paul adopted from Gamaliel, as it is assumed that as a Pharisee, Paul was already recognized in the community at that time as a devout Jew. Also, the extent to which Gamaliel influenced aspects of Christianity remains unmentioned. However, there is no other record of Gamaliel having taught publicly. However, the Talmud describes Gamaliel as teaching a student who displayed "impudence in learning," a detail that a few scholars identify as a possible reference to Paul in Shabbat 30b.

The relationship between Paul the Apostle and Judaism remains the subject of scholarly debate. Helmut Koester, Professor of Divinity and Ecclesiastical History at Harvard University, questions if Paul studied under Gamaliel at all, arguing that there is a marked contrast in the tolerance that Gamaliel is said to have expressed toward Christianity with the "murderous rage" against Christians that Paul is described as having before his conversion (Acts 8:1–3). However, Richard Bauckham, a scholar at Ridley Hall at Cambridge, argues that Paul was indeed connected to Gamaliel.

=== Alleged Gospel of Gamaliel ===
The "Gospel of Gamaliel" is a hypothetical book proposed by some scholars, perhaps part of the Pilate apocrypha. While no ancient sources directly refer to such a gospel, Paulin Ladeuze and Carl Anton Baumstark first proposed its existence in 1906. Scholars who believe such a book once existed have reconstructed it from a homily, the "Lament of Mary" (Laha Maryam) by a bishop named Cyriacus. They believe Laha Maryam extensively quotes the Gospel of Gamaliel; the Lament includes a section that leads with "I, Gamaliel", which caused speculation that these sections were actually quoting an existing gospel. Other scholars believe such inference that the author was "plagiarizing" a lost gospel is unwarranted: Cyriacus wrote these sections from the perspective of Gamaliel.

Reasonably complete manuscripts of Laha Maryam exist in both Geʽez and Garshuni versions. Regardless of whether Laha Maryam quotes a lost gospel, Gamaliel appears in it. He witnesses a miracle of healing in raising a dead man at the empty tomb; Jesus' abandoned burial shrouds have miraculous powers. Gamaliel also speaks with Pontius Pilate, who is portrayed favourably as a Christian.

=== Veneration ===
Saint Gamaliel
- Born: 1st century BC
- Died: 1st century AD
- Venerated in: Catholic Church, Eastern Orthodoxy
- Feast: 2 August (Eastern Orthodoxy), 3 August (Catholic)

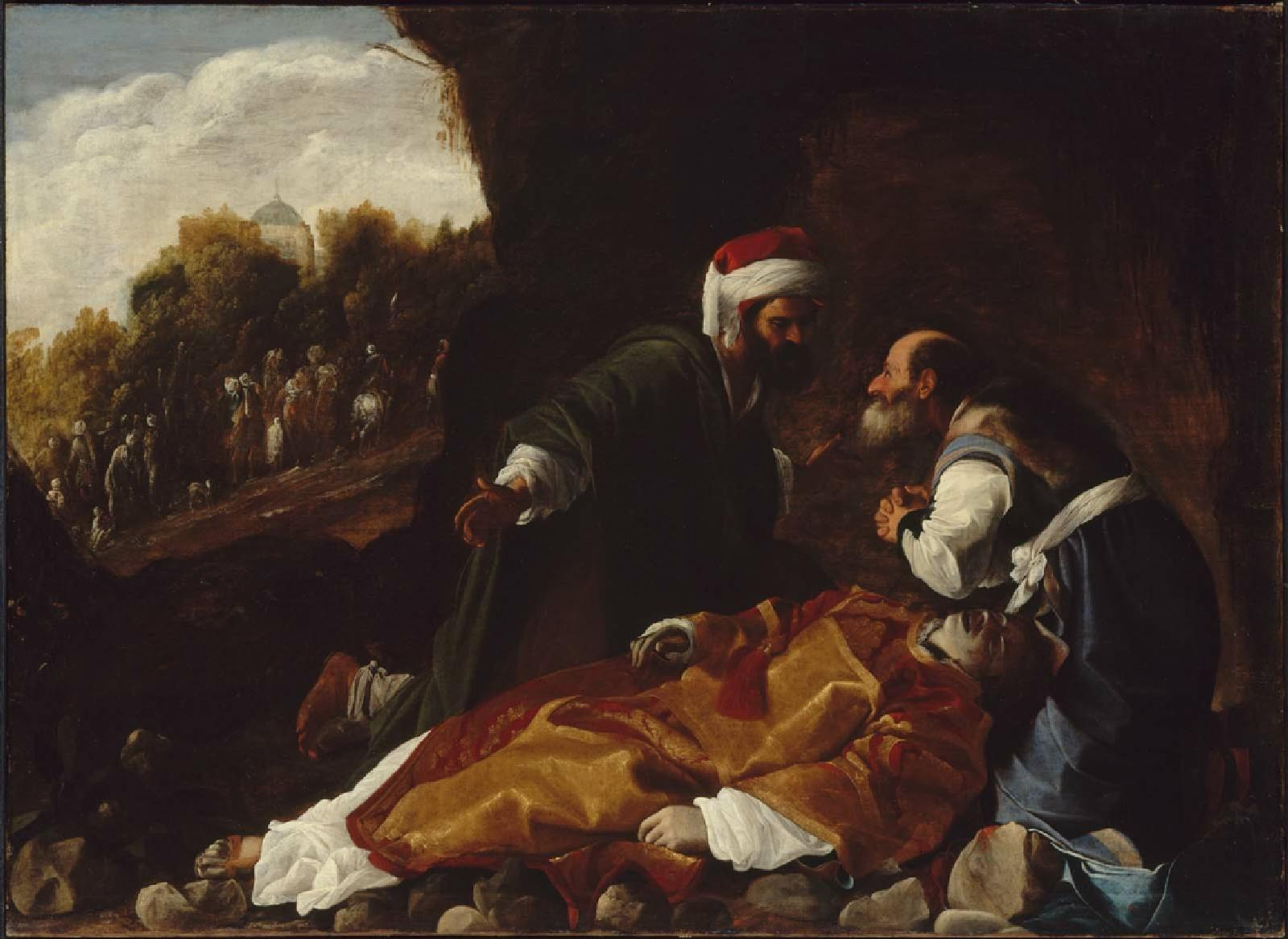
Saint Stephen Mourned by Saints Gamaliel and Nicodemus, follower of Carlo Saraceni, c. 1615, Museum of Fine Arts, Boston

Ecclesiastical tradition claims that Gamaliel had embraced early Christianity, and this explains his tolerant attitude toward early Christians. According to Photios I of Constantinople, he was baptised by Saint Peter and John the Apostle, together with his son Abibon (Abibo, Abibas, Abibus) and Nicodemus. The Clementine literature suggests he maintained secrecy about the conversion and continued to be a member of the Sanhedrin to assist his fellow Christians covertly in Recognitions of Clement 1:65–66 Some scholars consider the traditions to be spurious, and the passage in which Gamaliel is mentioned does not state that he became a Christian either implicitly or explicitly.

The Eastern Orthodox Church venerates Gamaliel as a saint. He is commemorated on August 2, the date when sacred tradition holds that his relics were found, along with those of Stephen the Protomartyr, Abibon (Gamaliel's son), and Nicodemus. The traditional liturgical calendar of the Catholic Church celebrates the same feast day of the finding of the relics on August 3. It is said that in the fifth century, his body had been discovered and taken to Pisa Cathedral by a miracle.

Gamaliel is referred to in the 15th-century Catalan document, Acts of Llàtzer.

== See also ==
- List of biblical figures identified in extra-biblical sources
- Gamaliel Foundation
- Gamaliel's principle
- Beit Jimal
- Split of Christianity and Judaism

Preceded by Simeon ben Hillel	Nasi c. 30–50	Succeeded by Shimon ben Gamliel
