= Religious reform =

Reform of religious teachings

A religious reform (from Latin re-: "back, again", and formare: "to form"; i.e. put together: "to restore, reconstruct, rebuild") aims at the reform of religious teachings. It is not to be confused with an organizational reform of a religious community, though mostly this is a consequence of a reform of religious teachings.

== Definition ==
Religious reforms are performed when a religious community reaches the conclusion that it deviated from its - assumed - true faith. Mostly religious reforms are started by parts of a religious community and meet resistance in other parts of the same religious community. Religious reforms usually lead to a reformulation of the religious teachings held for true, and to the condemnation resp. rejection of teachings held for wrong.

Mostly the deviation from the assumed true faith which gives reason for a religious reform crept in over a longer period of time, sometimes over centuries. A religious reform is always a reorientation at the historical beginnings of a religion (therefore: re-formare, reconstruct) under the perspective of the present time and with the knowledge of the present time. A typical example for deviations from an assumed true faith are social changes within society which lead a loss purpose for ethical prescriptions, so they have to be replaced by other ethical prescriptions in order to protect the underlying, unchanged value for the future. Another typical example is the factual falsification of traditional views, e.g. by better insights into historical events or into natural science, by which the traditional views are falsified.

The eternally continuing change of society and the progress of human knowledge are the reasons why a "final" reform of religious teachings is not possible. Religious teachings have to be reformed again and again. This realization was formulated in a concise Latin sentence, allegedly deriving from a saying of St. Augustine, and popularized by the Swiss Reformed theologian Karl Barth in 1947: Ecclesia semper reformanda est, which means "the Church must always be reformed".

Religious reforms do not aim at an adjustment to the spirit of the time in the first place, yet they naturally bring about certain adjustments to the present time, since the religious tradition is reconsidered and reformed under the perspective of the present time and with the knowledge of the present time. A full adjustment of a religious teaching to the spirit of the present time cannot be expected from a credible religious reform. Religious reforms which do not aim at the reestablishment of an assumed true faith in the first place, yet at a mere adjustment of religious teaching to the spirit of the time without respect to an assumed true faith are no religious reforms, strictly speaking. Their purpose is questionable since those reforms are not based on the faith of the believers. Reforms of this nature are often based on compulsion and are usually not long-lasting but are reversed in the next generations. An example is the attempt of the Roman emperor Julian the Apostate to restore paganism as state religion.

The opponents of justified religious reforms are called traditionalists, their ideology is traditionalism. The adherents of reforms to adjust to the spirit of the time in the first place without respect for an assumed true faith are called modernists, their ideology is modernism. Both concepts were coined by Christian-Catholic historical developments, yet today they are applied to all religions.

== Famous examples of religious reforms ==
- The Buddhist councils (from the 5th century BCE onwards), for the clarification on the fundamental teachings of Gautama Buddha among the early Buddhist schools.
- The First Council of Nicaea (325 CE), for the clarification on the doctrine of the Trinity among the early Christian theologians.
- The Muʿtazila school of Islamic theology, which existed between the 8th and 10th centuries.
- The Protestant Reformation led by Martin Luther, John Calvin, and other Protestant Reformers between the 16th and 17th centuries.
- Religious liberalism
  - Liberal Christianity
    - Fundamentalist–Modernist controversy
    - The introduction of the historical-critical method in Biblical scholarship in the 19th and 20th centuries.
  - Liberalism and progressivism within Islam
    - Islamic modernism
  - Reform Judaism, otherwise referred to as Liberal Judaism.
- The Second Vatican Council of the Catholic Church (1962–1965).

== See also ==
- Aggiornamento
- Bid'ah
- Criticism of Christianity
- Criticism of Islam
- Criticism of Judaism
- Continuous revelation
  - Personal revelation in the Latter Day Saint movement
  - Progressive revelation in the Baháʼí Faith
- Gamaliel's principle
- Heresy
- Religious studies
- Religious liberalism
- Sociology of religion

== Bibliography ==
- Ronald L. Johnstone: Religion in Society: A Sociology of Religion, Pearson/Prentice Hall, 2006.
- Armin W. Geertz, Jeppe Sinding Jensen: Religion, Tradition, and Renewal, Aarhus Universitetsforlag, 1991.
- Michael Molloy, Richard C. Trussell: Experiencing the World's Religions: Tradition, Challenge and Change, McGraw-Hill Higher Education, 1998.
- John P. Bradbury: Perpetually Reforming: A Theology of Church Reform and Renewal, 2013.
