= Stele of Quintus Aemilius Secundus =

First-century Roman tombstone

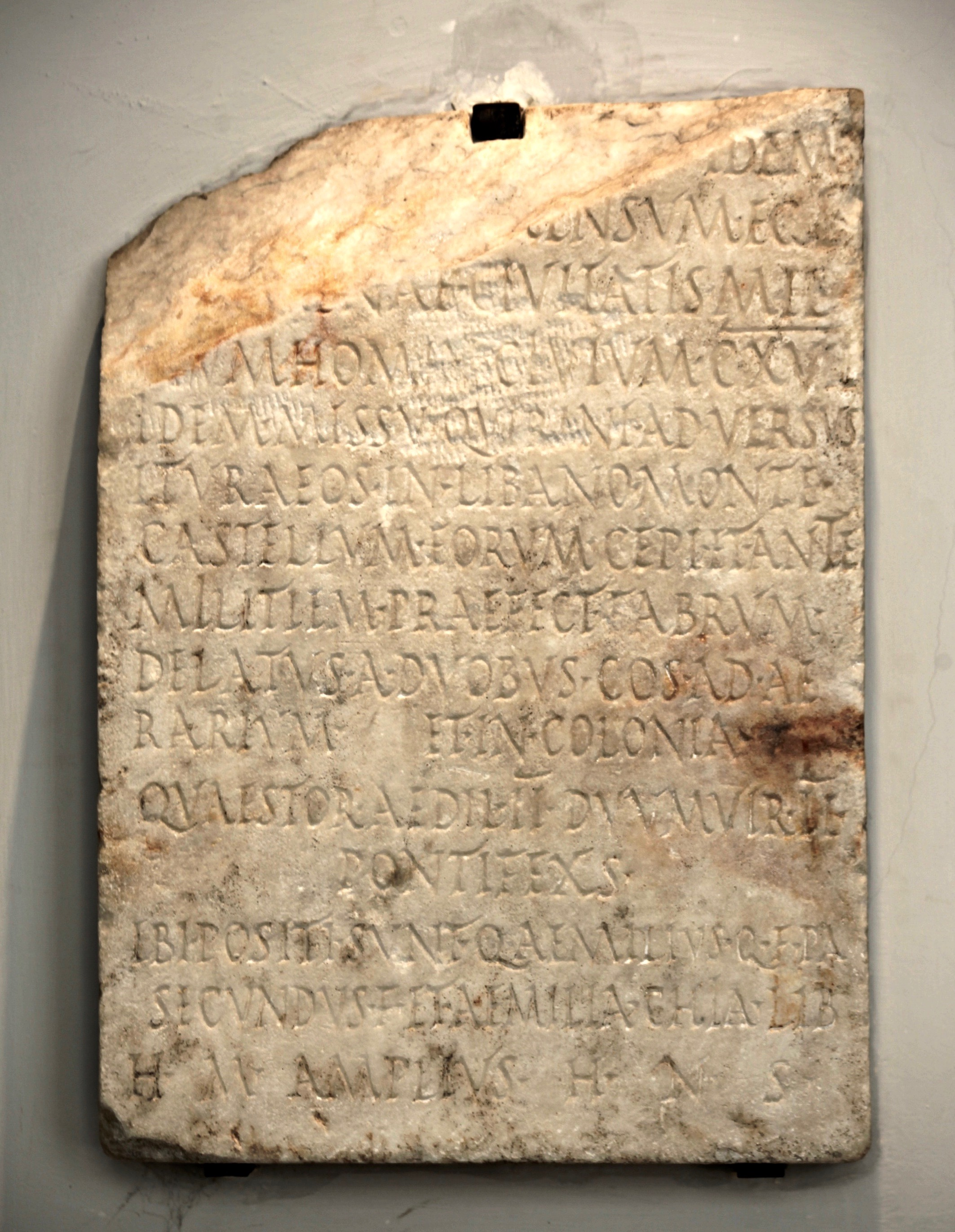
- Funerary inscription of Q. Aemilius Secundus, Venice National Archaeological Museum CIL III 6687, ILS 2683
- Type: Tombstone
- Created: 1st century AD
- Discovered: pre-1674 Beirut
- Present location: Venice National Archaeological Museum
- Culture: Roman

The Stele of Quintus Aemilius Secundus is a first-century Roman tombstone bearing a notable funerary inscription. It records how the dedicatee served in Roman Syria under Publius Sulpicius Quirinius, who was governor of Syria at the time, and there oversaw a census in the town of Apamea.

== Text ==
The translation of the inscription reads as follows:

Quintus Aemilius Secundus son of Quintus, of the Palatine tribe, decorated with honours in the service of the deified Augustus under Publius Sulpicius Quirinius, legate of Caesar in Syria. He was prefect of cohors I Augusta and prefect of cohors II Classica. At the command of Quirinius, I carried out a census of the district of Apamea involving 117,000 citizens. Likewise when sent by Quirinius against the Itureans, I captured their fort on the Mount Lebanon. Before being involved in military service as a commander of a core of engineers, I was appointed by the two consuls as treasurer, and in the colony I was treasury secretary to the aedile twice, duumvir a second time and was as a priest. Quintus Aemilius Secundus son of Quintus of the Palatine tribe, his son and Aemilia Chia his freedwoman were placed there. This monument is excluded from the inheritance.

== Discovery ==
The stele was apparently brought from Beirut to Venice in the 17th century, possibly as part of a ship's ballast, and there was transcribed by the antiquary Ursatus Patavinus in 1674. Pavatinus' transcript was published posthumously in 1719. The stele was subsequently lost, and the transcript was suspected to be a forgery until the lower part of the original was rediscovered in 1880 on Giudecca, where it had served as a window sill in a private house. It is now on display in the National Archaeological Museum in Venice.

== Significance ==
The stele has been discussed in the context of the census in Judea mentioned in the Gospel of Luke, which was conducted under Quirinius's supervision.

The information that the population of the district around Apamea stood at 117,000 is of particular interest to historians, as data on the Syrian demographics of the period is otherwise scanty.

== Bibliography ==
- Cumont, Franz (1934). "The Population of Syria". The Journal of Roman Studies. 24: 187–190.
- Lendering, Jona (2019). "Beirut, Tombstone of Q. Aemilius Secundus". Livius.org. Archived from the original on 2019-08-27.
- Marucci, Corrado (1996). "Storia e amministrazione romana nel Nuovo Testamento". In Haase, Wolfgang; Temporini, Hildegard (eds.). Aufstieg und Niedergang der römischen Welt/Rise and decline of the Roman world (in Italian). Vol. 2. Berlin, Boston: De Gruyter. ISBN 9783110830880.
- Schäfer, Nadja (2000). Die Einbeziehung der Provinzialen in den Reichsdienst in augusteischer Zeit (in German). Stuttgart: Franz Steiner. ISBN 978-3-515-07723-1.
- Zeichmann, Christopher B. (2018). "Text sometimes related to the Augustan cohort of Acts 28 (i.e., cohors Augusta)". Database of Military Inscriptions and Papyri of Early Roman Palestine.
