= Abibon =

1st-century Christian saint

Saint Abibon
- Born: 1st century AD
- Venerated in: Catholic Church, Eastern Orthodoxy
- Feast: 2 December

Abibon (fl. 1st century AD), also known as Abibas, was the son of Gamaliel, the teacher of Paul the Apostle. He died at the age of 20. He and his father are regarded as saints of the Catholic and Eastern Orthodox Churches. The finding of their relics is celebrated as a feast day on 3 August. Other days of commemoration are observed in their honour regionally; for example 2 December is especially celebrated in Pisa.

== Life ==
Not much is known about Abibon's life. He was the second son of Gamaliel, a leading member of the Sanhedrin in the early first century. He is said by some sources to have been baptized with his father and his brother Nicodemus. After being baptized alongside his father he died at the age of twenty of natural causes.

== Relics ==
In 415, Abibon's body was found alongside those of Saint Stephen, Nicodemus, and his father in Capergamela, a town twenty miles from Jerusalem. They were transferred to Constantinople in 428.
