= Eifert =

The surname of Eifert, Eiffert, Eyfert, is German in origin. It has in its modern context in the translation of zealot, (of the Greek: zelotes = the Eiferer, in Hebrew kanai) the biblical form, Pinhas the zealot. There is also an early Prussian translation that means "one who protects what is dear", and symbolized in art by a wall or castle engulfed in flames.

== History ==
The probable origin of the word as a surname came during the Thirty Years War that arose as a part of the Protestant Reformation within the Holy Roman Empire. In the German development language, zealot is stated to be a synonym used for an "Eiferer" or fanatic. Specifically, the word likely originates in the "Synkretistischen" dispute, as a zealot in the context of German history during that time stands for the Orthodox Lutherans.

The Synkretistische dispute was a public argument between Lutheran clergyman and reform fanatics. The dispute ignited itself around George Calixtus (14. December 1586 in Medelby, Schleswig; † 19. March 1656 in Helmstedt) Beginning in 1609, he travelled for four years in Germany, Belgium, England, and France. He spent time learning different Protestant teachings and he tried to create a "unified theology" for the new Protestant faith. Appalled over the horrors of the Thirty-Years war, his concept sought to find a valid basis for all Christian denominations to find common ground in the Apostles' Creed that was a broad enough basis for Christian union and communion. He looked to the apostolic creed and the decisions of the church scholars of the first five centuries after the death of Jesus Christ as the basis for his concept. For this, he was accused of "syncretism for the ecumenical spirit" in which he looked to treat both Catholics and Calvinists as brothers in Christ.

Calixtus's was contrasted by Abraham Calovius (16. April 1612 in Mohrungen, Ostpreußen; † 25. February 1686 in Wittenberg) who opposed the Catholics, Calvinists, and Socinians, and in particular attacked the syncretism of his bitter enemy. While Calixtus affirmed that the Apostles' Creed was an adequate definition of faith, Calovius rather held that one must believe every part of revealed truth in order to gain salvation. This led Calovius to deny as a heresy the idea that Roman Catholics or Calvinists could be partakers of salvation.

Due to the continued rivalry between the Catholic Church and the elements within the forming Lutheran church, families in the newly determined Protestant duchies and Principalities often devoted their families by name, to their cause. Specifically in the case of the Eifert family in Saxony, the family had a multi-generational relationship with the Orthodox clergymen living in the Merseburg region. Johann Christophe Eifert, a free Jäger working for the famous German theologian Herr Carl Melchoir von Böse, introduced his son Karl Traugott Eifert into the clergy when he married Margarethe Eliz. Koppeheel, the daughter of the regional theologian M. Martin Koppeheel of Seeligstadt.

Their son, Karl Eifert also married a ministers daughter, Johanna Christiana Frederika Lohrengel. Karl eventually graduated from the University of Leipzig, became the Protestant Minister of the main church in Merseburg, the Bishop of Zeit, the superintendent of the Land Schule Pforta, and published a book in 1780 called Untersuchung der Frage: Könnte nicht die mosaische Erzählung vom Sündenfalle buchstäblich wahr, und durch den Fall ein erbliches Verderben auf die Menschen gekommen seyn? In his biography written at the time of his death, he was also listed as having served twice as the Chancellor to the family von Böse during his life. Carl had clergymen sons and grandsons for another four generations.

His son was Ernst Traugott Eifert. During the French Revolution Ernst moved to Paris, spending four years studying the effects on French society and learning the language. He returned to Germany and established himself as a French teacher at the University town of Tubigen, in the Kingdom of Wurtemberg. Ernst also went into private business as a "buchdruker" or literary publisher, producing virtually all the academic works for the University of Tübingen over a period of forty years. Ernst also opened "Eifertei" a beer garden, directly across from the University. His establishment was frequented by both politically charged students and tradesmen of the area. The result was often politically fueled brawls, making his pub famous.

Ernst had three children. Michael who moved to America, Auguste who married a clergyman, and Maximillian Carl Eifert. Max Eifert (1808–1888) was a theologian knighted twice; the Queen's Order of Olga in 1871, and the Friedrich Order–Knights Cross 1st Class–in 1874. Max lived in Calmbach and Eningen unter Achalm, Kingdom of Württemberg. It was he who captured many of the Black Forest cultural stories and published them in the mid-to-late 19th century. Today there is a street named in his honor in Calmbach. Of his two sons one became a minister and the other was a forestry professor at the University of Hohenheim.

== Sources ==
- Calovius, Abraham from the Christian Cyclopedia
- Abraham Calov's Doctrine of Vocatio in Its Systematic Context
- De praecipuis Christianae religionis capitibus hodie controversis disputationes XV Helmstedt, 1613
- Epitome Theologiae Goslar, 1619
- De vera christiana religione et ecclesia Helmstedt, 1633
- Carl Traugott Eiferts ... Untersuchung der Frage: Könnte nicht die mosaische Erzählung vom Sündenfalle buchstäblich wahr, und durch den Fall ein erbliches Verderben auf die Menschen gekommen seyn? at Google Books
- Max Eifert in the German Wikipedia
