= Propaganda in Augustan Rome =

Propaganda by Emperor Augustus

Augustan Rome
- 27 BCE – 14 CE
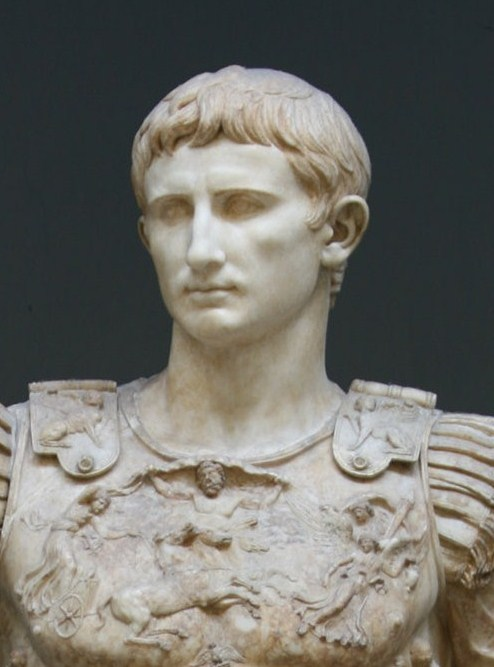
- Augustus

The Roman emperor Augustus employed various forms of propaganda as he ascended to power, including several forms of artwork and literature which promoted the image of Augustus as the enforcer of the Pax Romana ('Roman Peace', a.k.a. the Pax Augusta). Augustus’ wide range of propaganda targeted all members of Roman society. He used art, architecture, and coinage to appeal to the general populace, while texts, such as poetry and history, targeted the upper class.

Augustus’ family, especially the women, played a pivotal role in helping to maintain the Principate. His family acted as exemplars of the ideal Roman citizen. His wife, Empress Livia, exerted much political influence through her status of privileged counselor to the emperor. Moreover, one of Augustus' daughters, Julia the Elder, solidified her father's bloodline in future ruling generations, ensuring the continuation of his legacy.

Augustus’ approach to propaganda allowed him to dominate public and private sectors of daily Roman life. Archaeological evidence and scholarly interpretations demonstrate the effectiveness of his propaganda.

Augustus aimed to project a variety of glorified images of himself. To achieve this, he emphasized his divine ancestry from Julius Caesar. Augustus aimed to stabilize Rome from civil strife, as the city had been plagued by fights for power.

== Literature ==
=== History ===
==== Res Gestae ====
The most common piece of Augustan literature is the Res Gestae Divi Augusti (The Deeds of the Divine Augustus), a document Augustus wrote before his death listing the accomplishments of his life. Though the text did not influence perceptions of Augustus during his life, it did influence his legacy. The first line of the Res Gestae Divi Augusti reads:

A copy below of the deeds of the divine Augustus, by which he subjected the whole wide earth to the rule of the Roman people, and of the money which he spent for the state and Roman people...

Here, due to the emperor's religious importance in ancient Rome, he uses the term 'divine' to refer to himself. His importance and actions for the state are constantly referred to throughout the Res Gestae. Augustus boasts his military strength through anecdotes of his conquests, building upon how he had heroically avenged his adoptive father Julius Caesar by defeating his assassins. The original Res Gestae, which has not survived, was engraved upon a pair of bronze pillars and placed in front of his mausoleum. However archaeologists have found copies in Galatia in Asia Minor and Antioch in Pisidia, which further suggests his intent to use it to influence his legacy.

Though all events written in the Res Gestae can be corroborated, Augustus chose to omit information from it. For example, Mark Antony's name is not used in the Res Gestae.

=== Poetry ===
==== Aeneid ====
The most famous piece of poetry in Augustus' time was Virgil's Aeneid, which narrates the birth of Rome through its founder Aeneas, a surviving Trojan warrior. The poem claims that the Romans had ancestors in the Trojans, and links Augustus to the descendants of Aeneas. Virgil uses this to illustrate how integral Augustus was to Roman culture and to praise Augustus and his divinity in Roman religion:

Time and again you’ve heard his coming promised-Caesar Augustus! Son of a god [Julius Caesar], he will bring back the Age of Gold to the Latian fields where Saturn once held sway, expand his empire past Garamants and the Indians to a land beyond the stars, beyond the wheel of the year, the course of the sun itself, where Atlas bears the skies and turns on his shoulder the heavens studded with flaming stars. Even now the Caspian and Maeotic kingdoms quake at his coming, oracles sound the alarm and the seven mouths of the Nile churn with fear. Not even Hercules himself could cross such a vast expanse of earth…

==== Metamorphoses ====
Roman author Ovid's Metamorphoses details the history of the world until the time of Julius Caesar through a Roman perspective. Ovid praises Augustus's achievements, comparing them favorably with Julius Caesar:

Seeing his son’s [Augustus] good works, Caesar [Julius] acknowledges they are greater than his own and delights at being surpassed by him.

This passage notes the prosperity that Augustus brought to Rome. There are also references to his leadership in the Sibylline Books, which Ovid likely acknowledged. The fourth book, dedicated to Venus, a goddess Julius Caesar claimed he was a descendant of, emphasized the divine heritage of Augustus and solidified his position as Rome's rightful ruler.

== Art ==
Many pieces of artwork were made of Augustus during his rule. Often this artwork served as means to control his public image.

=== Statues ===
Many statues depicted Augustus him in an act of prayer or sacrifice, as he was Rome's chief state priest. Statues during the Principate were placed in temples of the imperial cult and were designed as propaganda in order to project ideas about the emperor, especially concerning his legitimacy.

== Architecture and building programs ==
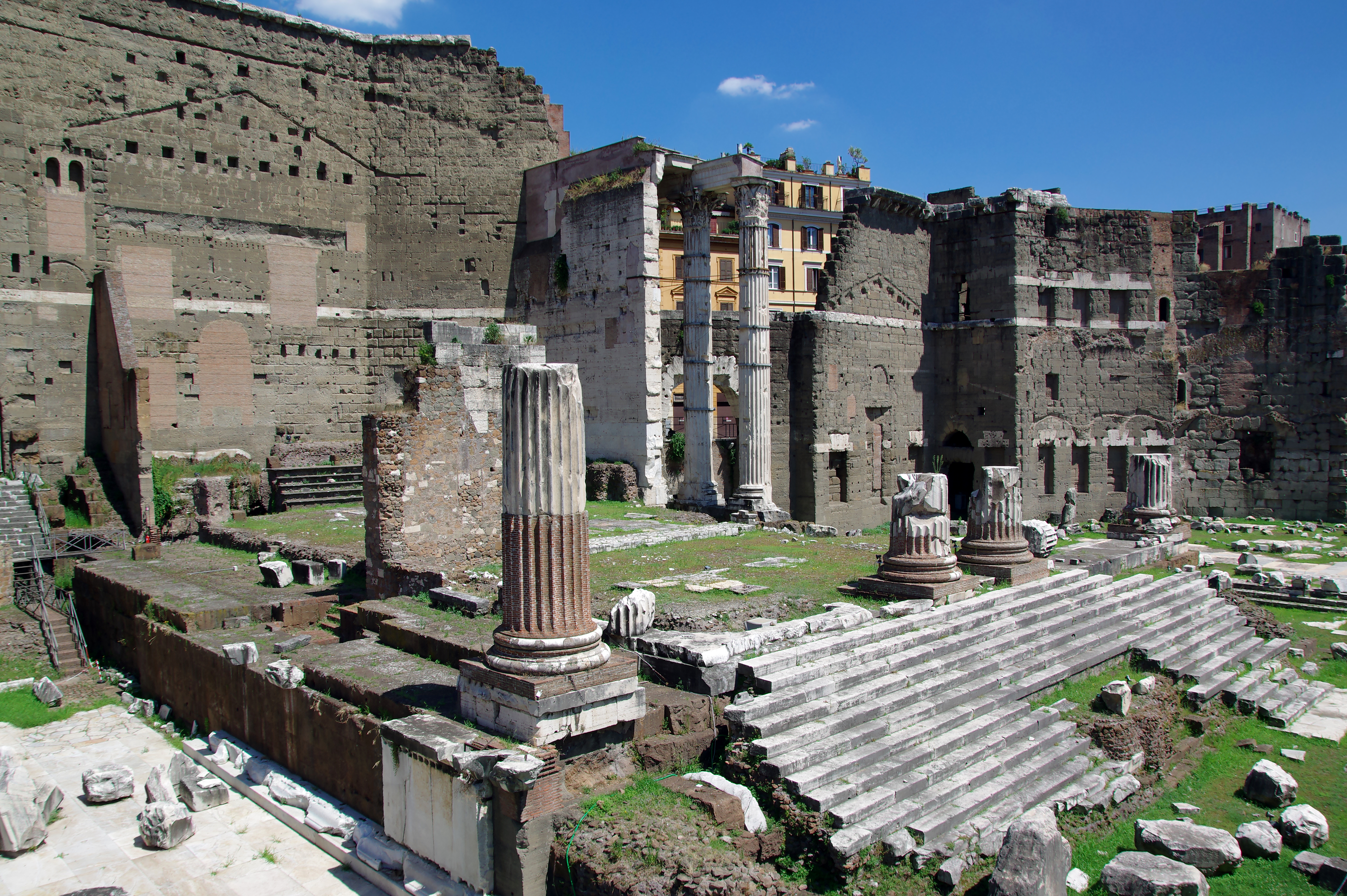
Forum of Augustus

By restoring Rome using his building program, Augustus could physically demonstrate the prosperity he created and thereby ensure loyalty from Roman citizens. He mentions in the Res Gestae that he restored eighty-two temples and repaired bridges and aqueducts, including the Theatre of Pompey. In this way, Augustus could prove that he was revitalizing the Roman empire.

The building program was a form of propaganda in itself, creating a perception among Romans that Augustus was an omnipotent restorer of Rome. By securing the city, he was reinforcing his image as the savior of Rome and the bringer of prosperity and peace. Suetonius and Dio believe this garnered the support of the senatorial and equites classes as they were also encouraged to create monuments under their own names. They also garnered respect and loyalty for Augustus.

Examples of notable buildings built during Augustus's reign are the Forum of Augustus, Ara Pacis, Temple of Apollo Palatinus, and the Temple of Mars Ultor.

== Coins ==
According to Andrew Wallace-Hadrill, there are two ways to interpret the use of Augustan coins. He uses the terms legalistic and charismatic to categorize the types of coins produced to consolidate Augustus' authority. As the majority of the Roman population was illiterate, the depiction of Augustus was paramount, especially since it would reach all corners of the empire. The coins were also another method to remind the citizens of their loyalty and service to the Principate.

=== Legalistic ===
As an officially recognized coin provided by the Principate, Augustus's idealized image of himself was imbued throughout the currency. These were also known as 'imperial coins' and have been used as a way to understand how the emperor intended himself to be viewed. Through his coins, Augustus promoted the image of him as the avenging son of Julius Caesar. Many of his coins bore the phrase 'DIVI FILIUS', which means 'son of the divine', to pay homage to his father, Julius Caesar.

=== Charismatic ===
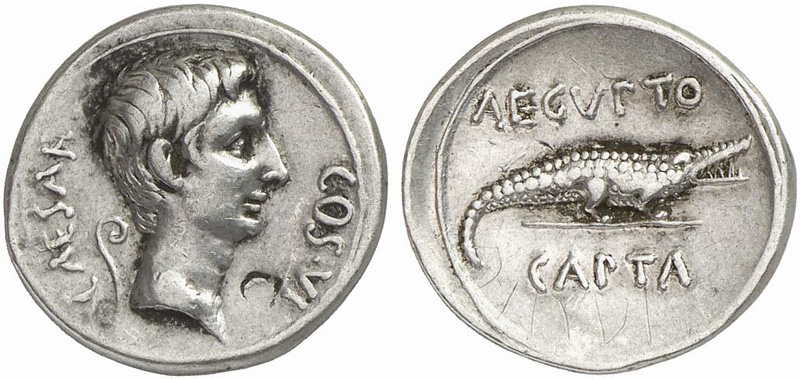
An Augustan coin, bearing the phrase 'AEGYPTO CAPTA'

This coin type, although not as significant as legalistic coinage, also had some effect in creating and maintaining the emperor's image.

An example of this is Augustus' coin in celebration of his conquest of Egypt. The symbolic victory over the so-called barbaric East established Augustus' might and force, as it allowed him to eliminate the civil strife that had continually plagued Rome after Caesar's death. This theme was also used in other types of Augustan propaganda.

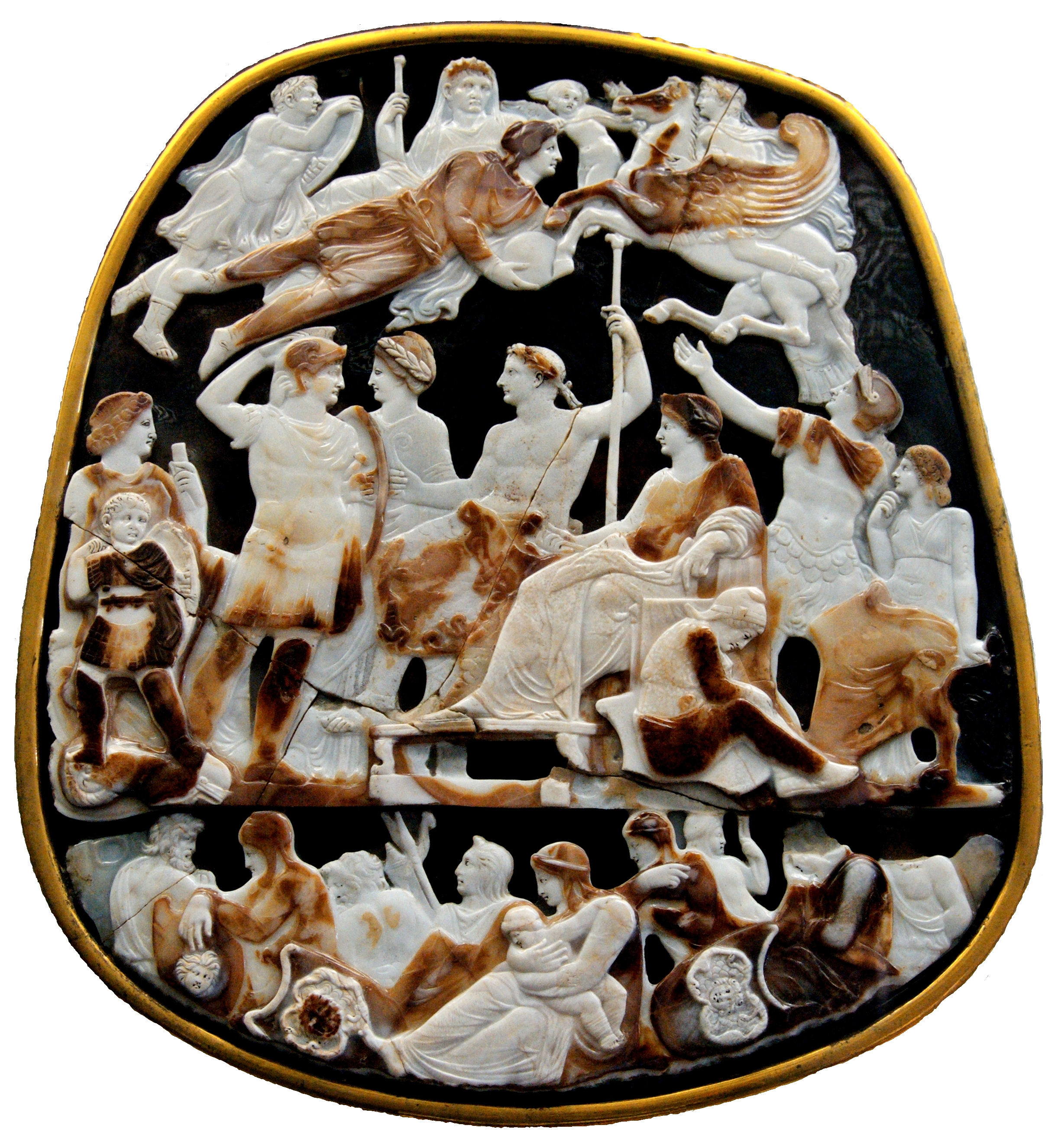
The Great Cameo of France, which has a depiction of Augustus and his family

== Imperial family and women ==
The role of the imperial family, especially for the imperial women, was to decorate and boast Augustus's image and virtue.

This is evident in Livia's conduct. She was portrayed as an ideal traditional Roman woman with admirable morals and ethics. Being a conservative traditionalist, Augustus proposed a series of moral reforms that reinforced the values of women's subservience and chastity. Portrayals of Livia in statues conceal her skin, depicting her as a modest and conservative woman. It can be concluded that Livia's main role in propaganda was to help Augustus uphold his moral reforms. Julia was similarly essential in emphasizing the importance of child-bearing and marriage. Julia, however, became known for her adulterous behavior after a series of marriages and divorces and was subsequently banished for no longer conforming to the emperor's values.
