= Theudas =

1st century AD Jewish rebel

Theudas (/ˈθjuːdəs/; Greek: Θευδᾶς; died c. 46 CE) was a Jewish rebel of the 1st century AD. Scholars attribute to his name a Greek etymology and according to Thayer, is a contraction of Theodore, and Hitchcock, for his part, says it means "flowing with water" , although with a Hellenist-styled ending. At some point between 44 and 46 CE, Theudas led his followers in a short-lived revolt.

== The revolt ==
The principal source for the story of Theudas' revolt is Josephus, who wrote:

It came to pass, while [Cuspius] Fadus was procurator of Judea, that a certain charlatan, whose name was Theudas, persuaded a great part of the people to take their effects with them, and follow him to the Jordan river; for he told them he was a prophet, and that he would, by his own command, divide the river, and afford them an easy passage over it. Many were deluded by his words. However, Fadus did not permit them to take any advantage of his wild attempt but sent a troop of horsemen out against them. After falling upon them unexpectedly, they slew many of them and took many of them alive. They also took Theudas alive, cut off his head, and carried it to Jerusalem. (Jewish Antiquities 20.97-98)

Josephus does not provide a number for Theudas's followers, but the movement was dispersed and never heard of again.

== The Theudas problem ==
The sole reference to Theudas presents a problem of chronology if one assumes that the Acts of the Apostles and Josephus are speaking of the same person. In Acts, Gamaliel, a member of the Sanhedrin, defends the apostles by referring to Theudas:

Men of Israel, be cautious in deciding what to do with these men. Some time ago, Theudas came forward, claiming to be somebody, and many men, about four hundred, joined him. But he was killed and his whole following was broken up and disappeared. After he came Judas the Galilean at the time of the census; he induced some people to revolt under his leadership, but he too perished and his whole following was scattered. Acts 5:36–7

The author of Acts has Gamaliel, speaking before the year 37, refer to an incident that preceded the revolt of Judas of Galilee at the time of the Census of Quirinius, which occurred decades before in 6 CE. Josephus makes clear that the revolt of his Theudas took place c. 45, years after Gamaliel addressed the Sanhedrin and an entire generation after Judas the Galilean.

It has been proposed that the writer of Acts used Josephus as a source, and made a mistake in reading the text, taking a later reference to the execution of the "sons of Judas the Galilean" after the rebellion of Theudas as saying that the rebellion of Judas was later. However, other authors believe that Luke and Josephus used different sources and that there is no evidence that the latter served as inspiration for the former. It has also been suggested that the reference in Acts is to a different revolt by another, unknown Theudas, because Josephus states that there were numerous uprisings, saying there were "many insurgent leaders", but he gives details on only four and Theudas was not a unique name. According to ancient historian and New Testament scholar Paul Barnett "It seems unlikely that Luke would have made an error about an infamous contemporary". It is also possible that Josephus himself made a mistake, the Pulpit Commentary states: "Josephus may have misplaced the adventure of Theudas by some accidental error. Considering the vast number of Jewish insurrections from the death of Herod the Great to the destruction of Jerusalem, such a mistake is not very improbable."

== See also ==
- List of people who were beheaded

== Sources ==
- Flavius Josephus, Jewish Antiquities 20.97-98
- Acts of the Apostles 5:36
