= The Capture of Jerusalem by Titus (Poussin) =

Series of paintings by Nicolas Poussin

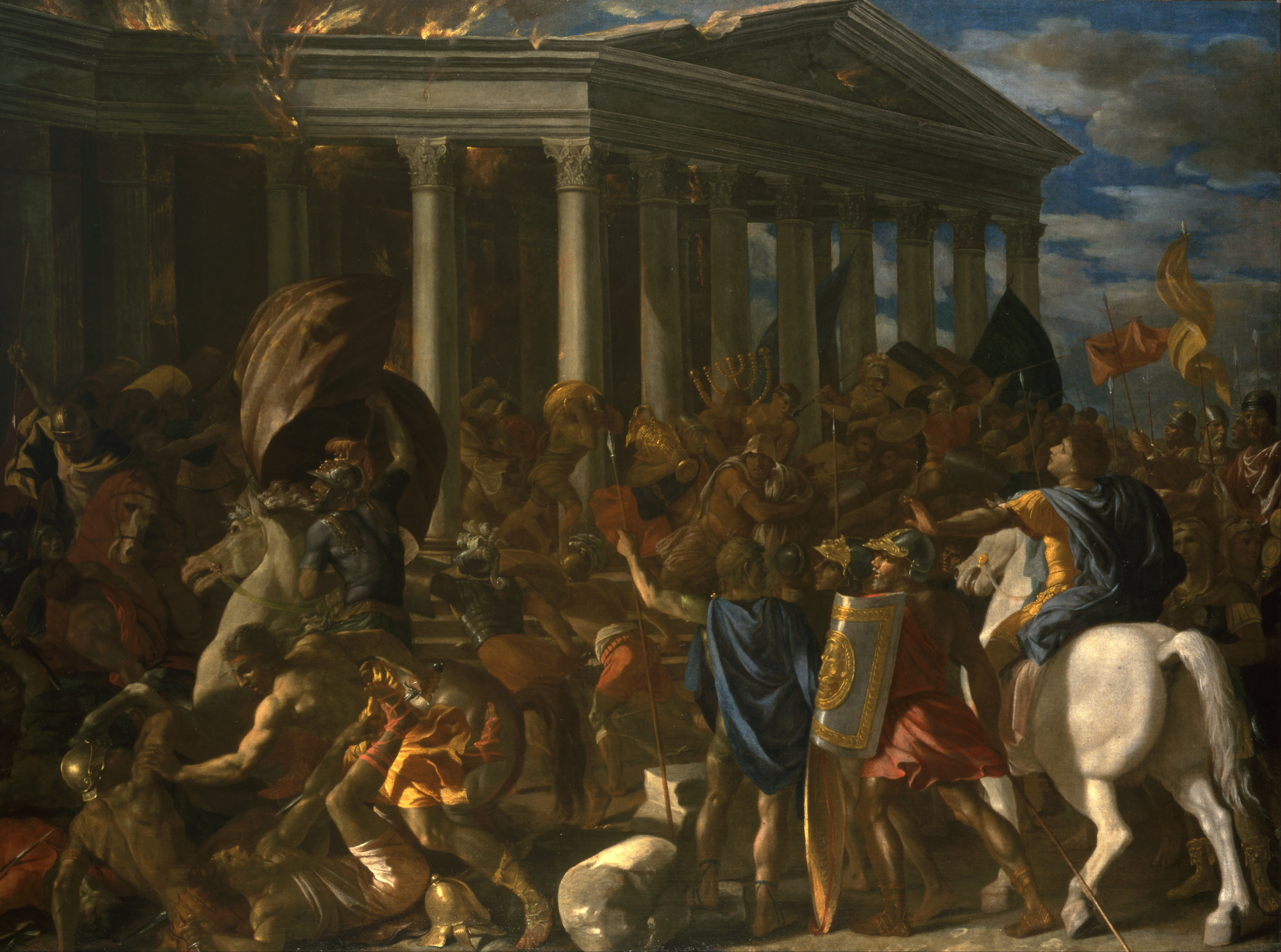
First version, oil on canvas, 145.8 x 194 cm

The capture of Jerusalem by Titus in AD 70 is the subject of several history paintings by Nicolas Poussin. The earliest version, dated to 1626, is in the Israel Museum, catalogued as The Destruction and Sack of the Temple of Jerusalem. Another version, dated to 1635, is in the Kunsthistorisches Museum in Vienna, catalogued as Destruction of the Temple in Jerusalem by Titus (German: Zerstörung des Tempels in Jerusalem durch Titus).

== First version ==
The subject is the conquest of Jerusalem and the spoilation of the Second Temple by the Roman army under the command of the future Emperor Titus in AD 70. As recounted by Josephus in The Jewish War, "… Caesar [Titus], both by voice and hand, signalled to the combatants to extinguish the fire; but they neither heard his shouts, drowned in the louder din which filled their ears, nor heeded his beckoning hand, distracted as they were by the fight or their fury. The impetuosity of the legionaries, when they joined the fray, neither exhortation nor threat could restrain; passion was for all the only leader. … While the temple blazed, the victors plundered everything that fell in their way and slaughtered wholesale all who were caught."

Painted for Cardinal Francesco Barberini in 1626. Mentioned by Smith (1837), considered lost by Blunt (1966) and Wright (1985), rediscovered by Sir Denis Mahon in 1995. Wright (2007), in his revised catalogue raisonné, comments: "This is the most significant work by Poussin to reappear in recent years." This picture is composed of fewer figures than the second version.

== Second version ==
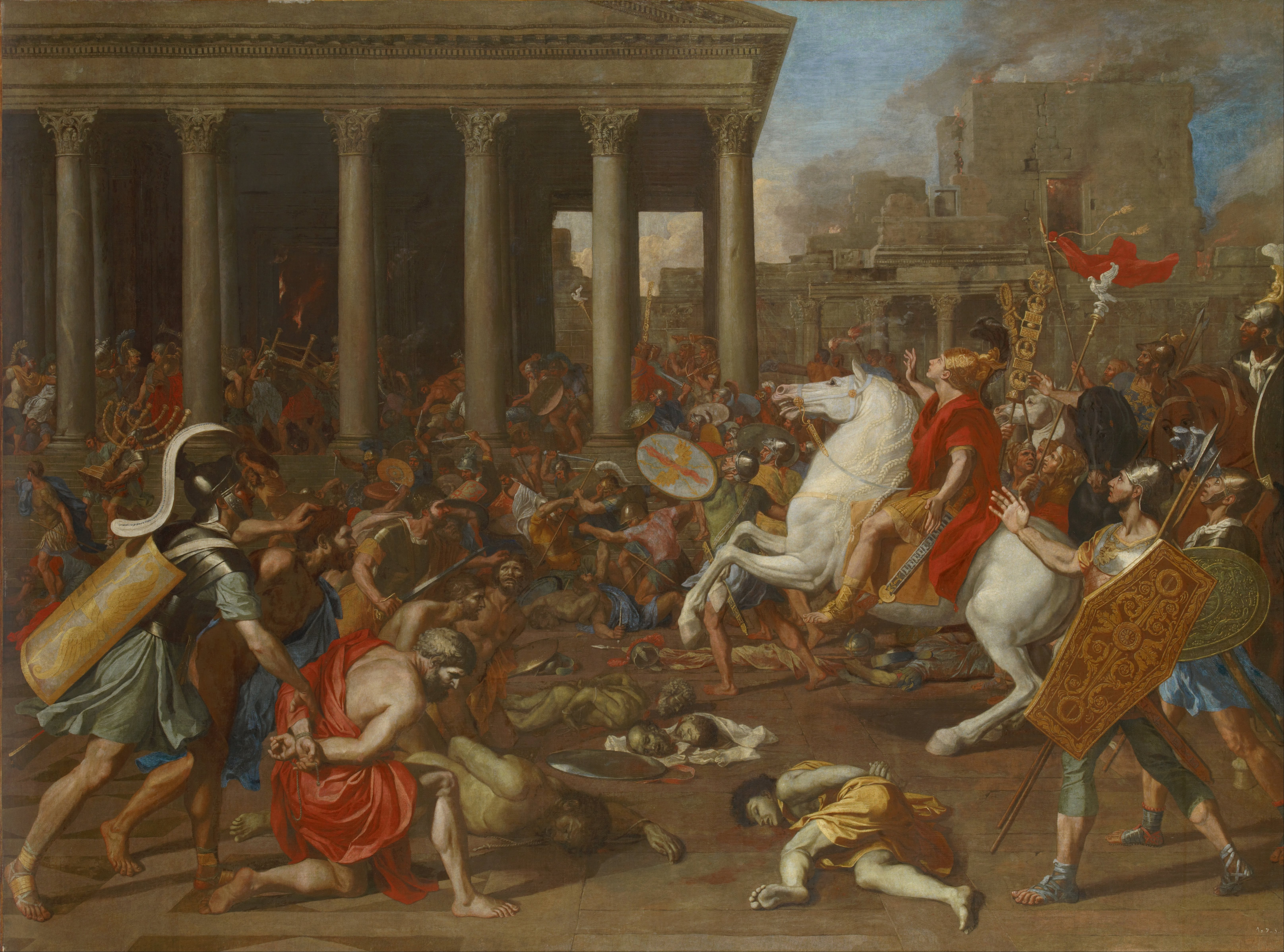
Second version, oil on canvas, 148 x 199 cm

The composition represents a scene of confusion consistent with the subject; but, amidst the tumultuary movement the victorious Titus is seen receiving the homage of the Jewish citizens and several Roman soldiers bearing away the costly vessels, and other treasures of the Temple, are conspicuous.

Wright sees similarities between this picture and Poussin's first version of The Rape of the Sabines, of about the same date.

Painted for Cardinal Barberini in 1635, and presented by him to the Prince of Eggenberg, Imperial Ambassador to the Holy See from 1638 to 1639, probably as a gift to the Holy Roman Emperor.

== See also ==
- List of paintings by Nicolas Poussin

== Bibliography ==
- Bellori, Giovanni Pietro (2005) [1672]. The Lives of the Modern Painters, Sculptors and Architects. Translated by Wohl, Alice Sedgwick; Wohl, Hellmut; Montanari, Tomaso. USA: Cambridge University Press. pp. 312, 447.
- Blunt, Anthony (1966). The Paintings of Nicolas Poussin. Critical Catalogue. London: Phaidon. pp. 29–30 (no. 37), 158–159 (no. L9).
- Mahon, Denis (1999). Nicolas Poussin: Works from His First Years in Rome. The Israel Museum, Jerusalem. pp. 62–72 (no. 5).
- Smith, John (1837). A Catalogue Raisonné of the Works of the Most Eminent Dutch, Flemish and French Painters: Nicholas Poussin, Claude Lorraine, and Jean Baptist Greuze. Vol. 8. London: Smith and Son. pp. 96–97 (nos. 179, 180).
- Wright, Christopher (1985). Poussin. Paintings. A Catalogue Raisonné. England: Harlequin Books. pp. 188 (no. 102), 248 (no. L16).
- Wright, Christopher (2007). Poussin. Paintings. A Catalogue Raisonné. London: Chaucer Press. pp. 34 (no. 11c), 144 (no. 102).
