= Judas of Galilee =

1st-century Jewish revolutionary

Judas of Galilee, or Judas of Gamala, was a Jewish leader who led resistance to the census imposed for Roman tax purposes by Quirinius in the Judaea Province in 6 AD. He encouraged Jews not to register, and those who did were targeted by his followers. He is credited with beginning the "fourth philosophy" which Josephus blames for the war with the Romans in 66–73. These events are discussed by Josephus in The Jewish War and Antiquities of the Jews and mentioned in the Acts of the Apostles.

In Antiquities of the Jews, Josephus states that Judas, along with Zadok the Pharisee, founded the Zealots, the "fourth sect" of 1st-century Judaism (the first three being the Sadducees, the Pharisees, and the Essenes). Josephus blames this fourth sect for the First Jewish–Roman War of 66–73. The Zealots preached that God alone was the ruler of Israel and urged that no taxes should be paid to Rome.

Several scholars, such as Gunnar Haaland and James S. McLaren, have suggested that Josephus's description of the fourth sect does not reflect historical reality, but was constructed to serve his interests. According to Haaland, the part covering the Zealots acts as a transition and an introduction to the excursion concerning the Jewish schools of thought, and to show that the Jewish War was incited by this faction. Similarly, McLaren proposes that Judas and his sect act as scapegoats for the war that are chronologically, geographically, and socially removed from the priestly circles of Jerusalem (and Josephus himself).

Josephus does not relate the death of Judas but does report that Judas's sons James and Simon were executed by procurator Tiberius Julius Alexander around the year 46. He also claims that Menahem ben Judah, one of the early leaders of the Jewish Revolt in 66 AD, was Judas's "son", which some scholars doubt. Menahem may have, however, been Judas's grandson. Menahem's cousin, Eleazar ben Ya'ir, escaped to the fortress of Masada, where he became a leader of the last defenders against the Roman Empire.

Judas is referred to in the Acts of the Apostles, in a speech by Gamaliel, a member of the Sanhedrin, who identifies Theudas and Judas as examples of failed Messianic movements.

== See also ==
- Galilean
- Gamala
- List of biblical figures identified in extra-biblical sources
