= Alexandria riot =

Alexandria riot may refer to:

- Alexandrian riots (38), attacks directed against Jews in Roman Alexandria, Egypt in the year 38 CE
- Alexandria riot (66), riots in Roman Alexandria, Egypt in the year 66 CE
- 2005 Alexandria riot, a riot against Christians in Alexandria, Egypt in the year 2005
