= Jewish revolt =

Jewish revolt may refer to the following:

- Judah's revolts against Babylon 601- 586 BCE
- Maccabean revolt 167–141 BCE
- Judas of Galilee uprisings in 4 BCE and 6 CE
- Jacob and Simon uprising 46 CE
- Jewish–Roman wars 66–135
  - First Jewish–Roman War 66–73
  - Kitos War 115–17
  - Bar Kokhba revolt 132–35
- Jewish revolt against Constantius Gallus 351–52
- Samaritan revolts 484–573
- Mar Zutra II revolt in Sasanian Persia 495–502
- Jewish revolt against Heraclius 614–17
- David Alroy uprising 11th century
- Jewish insurgency in Mandatory Palestine, 1940s
