= Tiberius (disambiguation) =

Tiberius was the second Roman emperor. The term may also refer to:

- Tiberius (praenomen), Roman personal name

== Roman persons named Tiberius ==
- Tiberius Claudius Nero (disambiguation), many people
- Tiberius Junius Brutus, son of Lucius Junius Brutus and later executed by his father
- Tiberius Sempronius Gracchus (disambiguation), many people
- Tiberius Coruncanius, consul 280 BC and military commander known for the battles against Pyrrhus of Epirus that led to the expression "Pyrrhic victory"
- Tiberius Claudius Drusus, birthname of Emperor Claudius
- Tiberius Gemellus, grandson of emperor Tiberius I
- Tiberius Julius Alexander, procurator of Judea c. 46–48, prefect of Egypt 66–69, and Roman general during the First Romano–Jewish War
- Tiberius Claudius Pompeianus, distinguished general under Marcus Aurelius and his confident
- Tiberius Claudius Pompeianus Quintianus, son of the above, was executed by Caracalla
- Tiberius of Agde, Christian martyr and saint, died 303; see November 10 in the Roman Martyrology
- Tiberius II Constantine, Byzantine emperor 578–582
- Tiberius (son of Maurice) (died 602), executed by Phocas
- David (son of Heraclius), Byzantine co-emperor (641), briefly assumed the regnal name Tiberius
- Tiberius (son of Constans II), Byzantine co-emperor 659–681
- Tiberius III (Apsimar), Byzantine emperor 698–705
- Tiberius (son of Justinian II), Byzantine co-emperor 706–711
- Basil Onomagoulos, Byzantine rebel and usurper in Sicily (717), assumed the regnal name Tiberius
- Tiberius Petasius, Byzantine usurper in Italy (730/731)

== Other historical persons named Tiberius ==
- Tiberius Hemsterhuis, Dutch philologist and critic
- Tiberius Velianas, mentioned in the Pyrgi Tablets

== Fictional persons named Tiberius ==
- James T. Kirk, full name James Tiberius Kirk. Captain of the starship USS Enterprise in Star Trek
  - Emperor Tiberius, the counterpart of James T. Kirk from the episode "Mirror Universe"
- Lucius Tiberius, fictional Roman Emperor from Arthurian Legend appearing first in Geoffrey of Monmouth's Historia Regum Britanniae

== Other uses ==
- Tiberius (Massie novel), a 1991 historical novel by Allan Massie
- Tiberius (band), an Indie Rock project that began in 2015
- Operation Tiberius, an investigation into systemic corruption, perversion of justice and bribery in the United Kingdom's police force
- Tiberius Bede, an 8th-century manuscript of Bede's Historia ecclesiastica gentis Anglorum in the Cotton library

== See also ==
- Tiberias, an ancient city in Israel named for Tiberius, the second Roman emperor
