= History of the Jews in Alexandria =

Jewish community in Egypt from 332 BCE

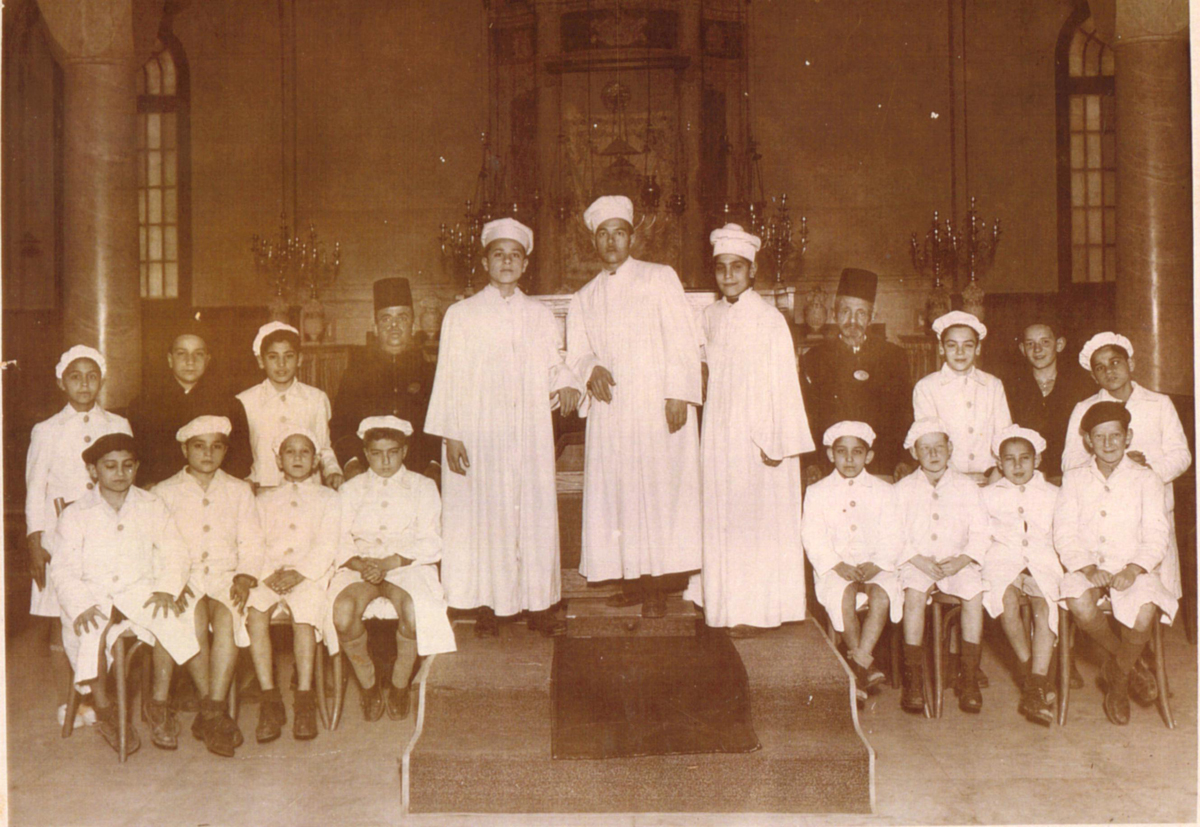
Choir of Rabbi Moshe Cohen at Samuel Menashe synagogue, Alexandria, pre-1967.

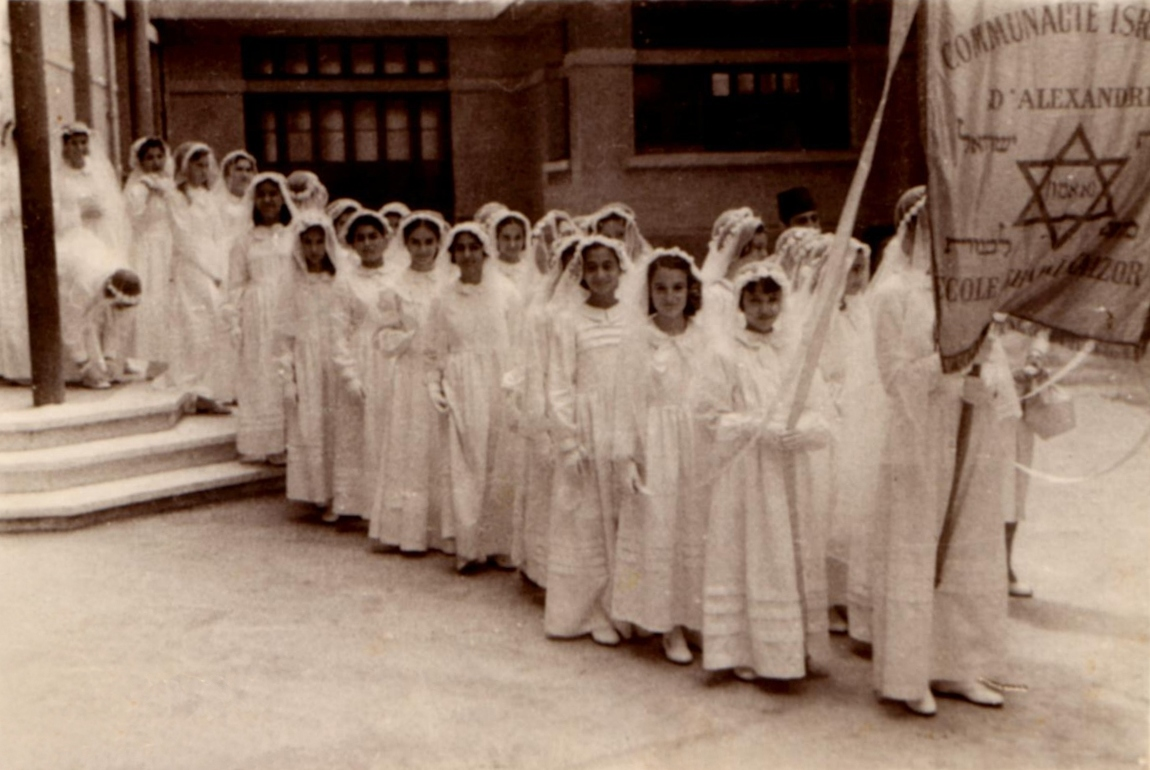
Jewish girls from Alexandria in 1955 for their confirmation service, a ritual similar to a Bat Mitzvah.

The history of the Jews in Alexandria dates back to the founding of the city by Alexander the Great in 332 BCE. Jews in Alexandria played a crucial role in the political, economic, cultural and religious life of Hellenistic and Roman Alexandria, with Jews comprising about 35% of the city's population during the Roman era.

In the Ptolemaic period, Alexandrian Jews played a central role in the development of Hellenistic Judaism and were instrumental in the translation of the Torah from Hebrew to Koine Greek, which produced the Septuagint. Many important Jewish writers and figures came from or studied in Alexandria, such as Philo, Ben Sira, Tiberius Julius Alexander and Josephus. The position of Alexandria's Jewry began deteriorating during the Roman era, as deep antisemitic sentiment began developing amongst the city's Greek and Egyptian populations. This led to the subsequent Alexandrian pogrom in 38 CE and the Alexandria riot in 66 CE, which was in parallel with the outbreak of the First Jewish–Roman War. Alexandria's Jewry began to diminish, leading to a mass immigration of Alexandrian Jews to Rome, as well as other Mediterranean and North African cities. It appears that the Jewish community of Alexandria was completely eradicated by the end of the Diaspora Revolt in 117 CE, with various rabbinic legends associated with the final destruction of the community.

By the beginning of the Byzantine era, the Jewish population had again increased, but suffered from the persecutions of the Christian Church. During the subsequent Muslim conquest of Egypt, the number of Jews in Alexandria increased greatly, with some estimates numbering around 400,000. Following the establishment of the State of Israel in 1948, and the ensuing Six-Day War in 1967, almost all of Alexandria's Jewish population were expelled from the country and immigrated to Israel.

== Hellenistic and early Roman period ==
According to Josephus, Jews had inhabited Alexandria since its founding, and most historians agree that Jews lived in the city since at least the beginning of the third century BCE. Under Ptolemaic rule, a separate section of the city was assigned to the Jews, so that they might not be hindered in the observance of their laws by continual contact with the pagan population. This Jewish Quarter was one of the five sections of the city, each named after a letter of the Greek alphabet, with the Jewish quarter being named Delta.

During this time, the Jews in Alexandria enjoyed a greater degree of political independence and prominence, serving as the city's moneylenders, premium merchants and alabarchs. The Jewish ethnarchs were also established during this time, along with a council of 71 elders. According to Strabo, the ethnarch was responsible for the general conduct of Jewish affairs in the city, particularly in legal matters and the drawing up of documents. The city also established a large Bet Din known as the "archion". The Great Synagogue of Alexandria (mentioned in the Talmud) was also established during this time. During the period of the Second Temple the Jews of Alexandria were represented in Jerusalem by a sizeable community.

During Herod's reign several prominent Alexandrian Jewish families lived in Jerusalem, such as Simeon the Just who was appointed high priest by Herod. Alexandria's Jewish population served as secular public officials and as soldiers for the Ptolemaic army. Rich Jews occasionally held the office of alabarch, such as Alexander the Alabarch. However, Ptolemy VII was hostile towards the Jews because when he strove to wrest the throne of Egypt from Cleopatra, the Jews, led by the general Onias, fought on the side of Cleopatra. During the Maccabean Revolt, an Alexandrian Jew probably wrote 2 Maccabees which defends Hellenism and criticizes the Seleucids, as opposed to 1 Maccabees which was written in Judea and criticizes the entire Hellenistic ideology.

Strabo (64/63 BCE–c.24 CE) described the Jewish community in Alexandria as having substantial autonomy, with an ethnarch that "governs the people and adjudicates suits and supervises contracts and ordinances just as if he were the head of a sovereign state." Contemporary studies affirm that the community had its own established social and legal institutions, operating with the consent of Ptolemaic and later Roman authorities. The Jews of Alexandria commemorated the translation of the Jewish Scriptures into Greek with an annual festival held on the island of Pharos, the site of the Lighthouse of Alexandria, and traditionally associated with the translation event. During this celebration, a sizable Jewish crowd, along with some non-Jewish visitors, would gather on the beach for a grand picnic.

== Roman period ==
Following the Roman conquest of Egypt, intense antisemitism became widespread throughout Alexandria's non-Jewish populations. Many viewed Jews as privileged isolationists. This sentiment led to the Alexandrian Pogrom in 38 CE, led by the Roman governor Aulus Avilius Flaccus. Many Jews were murdered, their notables were publicly scourged, synagogues were defiled and closed, and all the Jews were confined to one quarter of the city. Riots again erupted in 40 CE between Jews and Greeks. Jews were accused of not honouring the emperor, and Jews were angered by the erection of a clay altar and destroyed it. In response, Caligula ordered the erection of a statue of himself in the Temple of Jerusalem. Philo wrote that Caligula "regarded the Jews with most especial suspicion, as if they were the only persons who cherished wishes opposed to his."

Following the First Jewish–Roman War, many Romans in Alexandria questioned the loyalty of the city's Jewry. Violence occurred in 66 CE, when the Alexandrines had organized a public assembly to deliberate about an embassy to Nero, and a great number of Jews came flocking to the amphitheater. When the Alexandrines saw the Jews, they attacked them; the majority of Jews were killed, and those who were captured were burned alive. Following this event was the second Alexandrian pogrom. Tiberius Julius Alexander, the governor of Alexandria (who was born Jewish, but left the religion) was able to calm the riots. However, most Jews saw the rising antisemitism and emigrated out of the city, mostly to Rome and other Mediterranean and North African cities.

=== Alexandria during the Diaspora Revolt ===
During the Diaspora Revolt (115–117 CE), Jewish communities in the Roman provinces of Egypt, Cyrenaica, and Cyprus rose in rebellion while Emperor Trajan was in the east, engaged in his campaign against the Parthians. Papyrological evidence shows that the Roman garrison in Alexandria experienced setbacks in the summer of 116 CE. Jewish forces targeted the shrine of Nemesis, which housed Pompey's head, possibly in retaliation for Pompey's desecration of the Temple in Jerusalem in 63 BCE. Damage to other significant structures, such as the Serapeum of Alexandria, was likely inflicted by Jewish groups from Egypt and Cyrenaica rather than by Alexandria's own Jewish inhabitants. Eusebius's later account of Alexandria being "overthrown" and needing reconstruction by Hadrian is, however, considered exaggerated. Finally, the Roman suppression of the uprising in the city was aided by Greeks fleeing from Jewish attacks in other parts of the country.

By the end of the conflict in late summer 117 CE, it is highly unlikely that Jews remained in Alexandria. The Great Synagogue, celebrated in the Talmud, was destroyed, and the city's Jewish court might have been abolished. Surviving Jews would have faced assaults by mobs, official reprisals, and possible executions ordered by Hadrian. The extensive confiscation of Jewish lands indicates that the Jewish elite, including those in Alexandria, were not spared. The only Alexandrian Jews who might have survived were likely refugees who had fled to other regions at the onset of the revolt.

== Byzantine period ==
By the beginning of the Byzantine era, the Jewish population had again increased, but in 414 Cyril expelled the Jews from the city. According to contemporary Christian historian Socrates Scholasticus, the expulsion was a response to a Jewish-led massacre against some Christians. Historians are divided on whether the expulsion was wholesale or just against those who had perpetrated the violence.

There is evidence for Jews from Alexandria settling in Milan, Italy in late antiquity.

== Arab period ==
Following the Muslim conquest of Egypt starting in 641, Jews were allowed to return to the city; according to some Arab sources, the city had some 400,000 around the time of the conquest. However, Benjamin of Tudela who visited the town in about 1170, speaks of only 3,000 Jews living in Alexandria. Nevertheless, throughout the Middle Ages, Alexandria had a small but significant community of Jewish rabbis and scholars. The community is mentioned in several documents in the Cairo Genizah, some of which relate to Alexandrian Jews' reaction to the controversial Sar Shalom ben Moses.

During the 12th century, Aaron He-Haver ben Yeshuah Alamani served as the community's spiritual leader. During the Arab period, Alexandrian Jewry kept a close relationship with other Egyptian communities in Cairo, Bilbeis, El Mahalla El Kubra as well as several others. It was during this time that Alexandria had two synagogues, one of which was called "the Small Synagogue of Alexandria". The Jews of Alexandria were engaged in the international trade centered in their city, and some even held government posts.

== Mamluk and Ottoman periods ==
Under Mamluk rule, the Jewish population of Alexandria began to decline. Meshullam of Volterra, who visited it in 1481, states that he found only 60 Jewish families, but reported that the old men remembered the time when the community numbered 4,000. In 1488, Obadiah of Bertinoro found 25 Jewish families in Alexandria. Following the Alhambra Decree of 1492, a large number of Sephardic Jews immigrated to Alexandria. The historian Joseph Sambari mentions an active Jewish community in Alexandria during the 17th century. After the Chmielnicki massacres, some Ukrainian Jews settled in Alexandria.

In the 1660s some members of the community began to follow the Jewish mystic Shabbetai Zvi, while the majority adamantly opposed him. In 1700, some Jewish fishermen from Rosetta moved to Alexandria in hopes of better economic opportunities. During the French conquest of Egypt, Napoleon imposed heavy fines on the Jews and ordered the ancient synagogue, associated with the prophet Elijah, to be destroyed. Under the rule of Muhammad Ali of Egypt, Jews began to experience great social and economic development.

== Modern era ==
During World War I, many Jews living in Ottoman Palestine were exiled to Alexandria under Ottoman rule. In 1937, 24,690 Jews lived in Alexandria. Following the establishment of the State of Israel in 1948, and the ensuing Six-Day War, almost all of Egypt's Jewish population were expelled from the country and immigrated to Israel. As of 2017, only 12 Jews currently live in Alexandria. In February 2020, 180 Jews from Europe, Israel and the United States arrived in Alexandria to attend religious ceremonies at the historic Eliyahu Hanavi synagogue, which was renovated by the Egyptian government as part of a program to protect Jewish heritage sites.

Many of the Jews expelled in 1956 ended up in Italy, France and England. Others managed to get to North America as well as Central and Latin America. Only a minority of the Jews expelled by Nasser in 1956 actually went to Israel.

== See also ==
- History of the Jews in Egypt
- Hellenistic Judaism
- Philo
