= Tiberius Claudius =

Tiberius Claudius may refer to:

- Tiberius Claudius Cogidubnus, 1st-century king of the Regnenses in early Roman Britain
- Tiberius Claudius Narcissus, one of the freedmen who formed the core of the imperial court under the Roman emperor Claudius

== See also ==
- Tiberius Claudius Nero (disambiguation)
