= Tiberias (disambiguation) =

Tiberias is a city in Israel.

Tiberias may also refer to:

== Places and associated facilities ==
=== Australia ===
- Tiberias, Tasmania, a locality

=== Israel ===
- Tiberias Subdistrict, a subdistrict in Israel
  - Tiberias, a city
  - Tiberias Municipal Stadium
  - Tiberias Football Stadium

=== Palestine ===
- Tiberias Subdistrict, Mandatory Palestine, a former subdistrict in Palestine

== Other uses ==
- Tiberias Marathon, a road race in Israeli
- Tiberias Germanicus, a Roman emperor
- Tiberias massacre, a massacre in Tiberias

== See also ==
- Tiberius (disambiguation)
