= Lucius Tiberius =

Legendary Western Roman Emperor

Lucius Tiberius (sometimes Lucius Hiberius, or just simply Lucius; also Thereus in Claris et Laris) is a Western Roman procurator or emperor from Arthurian legend in which he is killed in a war against King Arthur. First appearing in Geoffrey of Monmouth's pseudo-historical work Historia Regum Britanniae, Lucius also features in later, particularly English literature such as the Alliterative Morte Arthure and Thomas Malory's Le Morte d'Arthur. The motif of a Roman Emperor defeated by Arthur is found in the Old French literature as well, notably in the Vulgate Cycle.

In the common narrative, after Arthur liberates Gaul from the Roman tribune Frollo, a Romanized German who tried to take advantage of Arthur's war with Claudas, word of his great deeds reaches Rome itself. Lucius demands that Arthur pay him tribute and recognize him as his sovereign, as had been done by Britain since the time of Julius Caesar. Arthur refuses on the basis that the British kings Belinus and Brennius had defeated Rome in the past. In retaliation, Lucius gathers heathen armies from Spain and North Africa and invades the lands of Arthur's allies on the continent in Brittany. Rome is supposed to be the seat of Christianity, but it is more foreign and corrupt than the courts of Arthur and his allies. He is also mentioned as married to daughter of one of his pagan allies, a Middle Eastern ruler named only just as the Emir (Amiraut), in the poem Didot Perceval.

Arthur and the other kings allied with him hurry across the English Channel against the Roman threat. In the Historia, the war begins when Lucius' nephew (uncle in the Alliterative Morte Arthure), Gaius Quintilianus, is killed by Gawain after he insults the Britons. Lucius himself then dies by an unknown hand as the armies of Rome and the Empire's Germanic allies are conquered by Arthur's forces. In Malory's version, following that of the Alliterative Morte Arthure, Lucius is killed in an intense personal duel with Arthur himself during their great battle; he manages to wound Arthur, who in turn decapitates Lucius with Excalibur. Arthur then sends the bodies of Lucius and other slain nobles back to Rome, telling them this is the only tribute he will send them. In the French Vulgate La Mort le Roi Artu, however, the Roman leader is portrayed more sympathetically. There, too, he ends up killed with Excalibur, but by Gawain's hand.

The figure of Lucius is clearly fictional, though whether Geoffrey took the character from tradition or completely created him for propagandist purposes is unknown, as is the case with much material in his Historia. Many of the figures associated with him, such as the kings who side with him, appear to be based on figures from Geoffrey's own era. Geoffrey Ashe theorizes that he was originally Glycerius, whose name was known to have been misspelled as "Lucerius" in texts prior to the writing of the Historia, and was further misspelled by Geoffrey of Monmouth as "Lucius Tiberius/Hiberius". Another theory, proposed by Roger Sherman Loomis, suggests that Lucius is a reflex of the god Lugh, under the name "Llwch Hibernus", which could change into "Lucius Hiber(i)us".

Though there are passages in Geoffrey's work that give him the title of Emperor, his Lucius seems to be placed under one Emperor Leo. In most post-Geoffrey versions, however, Lucius himself holds the position of Emperor and Leo is omitted. It is also possible that Geoffrey actually meant the historical Emperor Leo, a late 5th-century leader of the Eastern Roman Empire, as just an ally of the Western Romans. Lucius is referred to as both 'Tiberius' and 'Hiberius' in Geoffrey of Monmouth. Hiberius is a Latin name meaning "Spanish", and Lucius is explicitly called Spanish in one of the earliest adaptations from Geoffrey, Wace's Roman de Brut. It is also from Wace onwards that Leo is excised from the text and only Lucius himself is referred to as Emperor, and in the Alliterative Morte Arthure a character named Leo appears as merely a subordinate of Lucius.
