= Jewish–Roman wars =

Series of revolts by the Jews against the Roman Empire between 66 and 135 AD

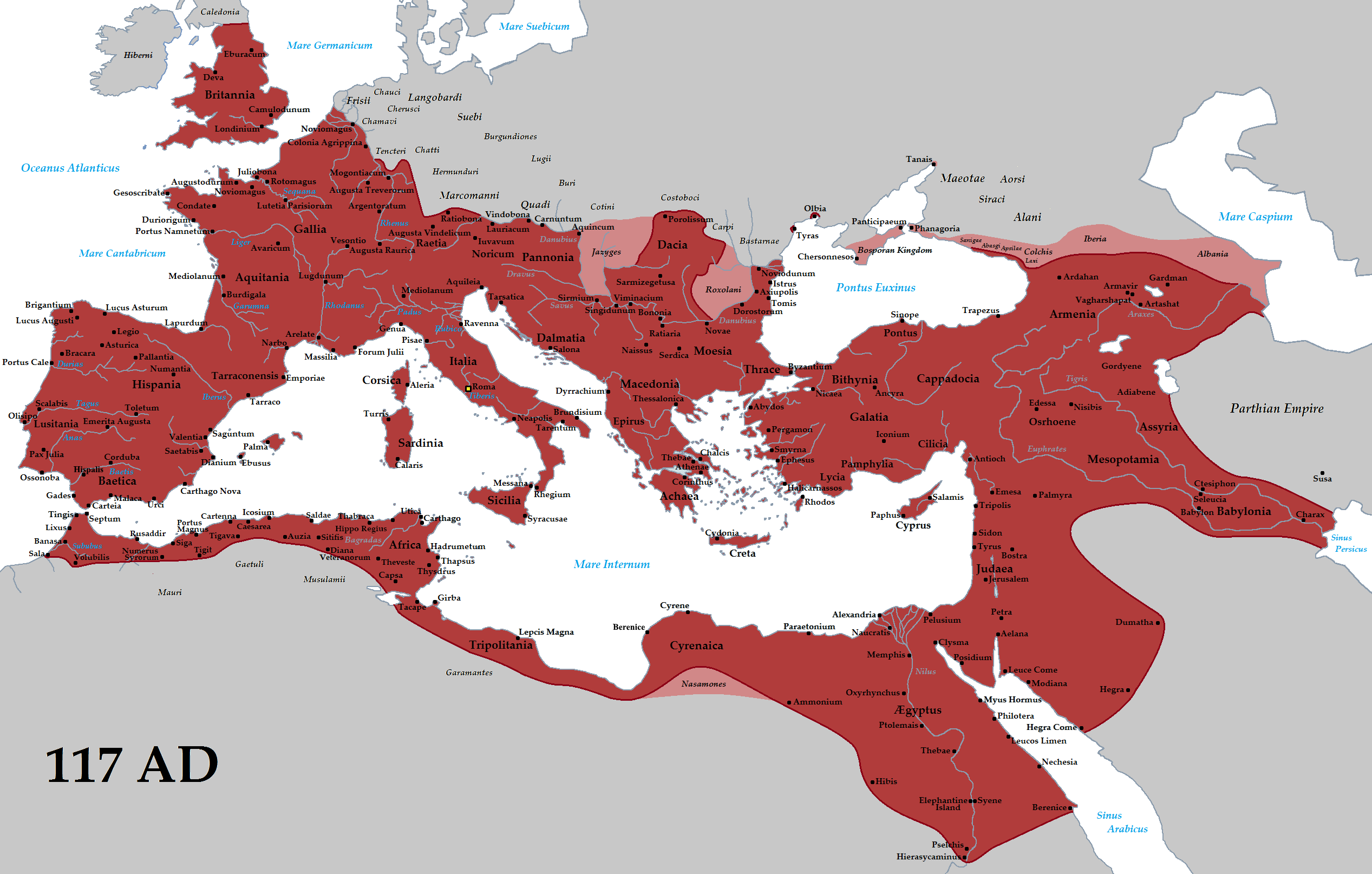
- The Roman Empire in 117 AD, at the height of its territorial extent, under Emperor Trajan. Judaea is located on the eastern shore of the Mediterranean Sea under Roman rule.
Date	66–135 AD (70 years)
Location	Judaea, Egypt, Cyprus, Cyrenaica, Mesopotamia
Result	Roman victory; Destruction of Jerusalem and the Second Temple; Widespread destruction in Judea and diaspora of many survivors; Rise of Rabbinic Judaism as the dominant Jewish sect; Growing separation of Christianity from Judaism; Consolidation of Jewish center in Galilee
Territorial changes	Judaea remains under Roman control; renamed to Syria Palaestina

Belligerents
Roman Empire	Judean provisional government Jewish Zealots Jewish rebels Judea under Bar Kokhba

Commanders and leaders
Titus; Vespasian; Marcus Lupus Marcius Turbo; Lusius Quietus Hadrian; Sextus Julius Severus	Hannan; Eleazar ben Hanania; Bar Giora; Eleazar; John Artemion; Lukuas; Julian and Pappus Simon bar Kokhba †; Eleazar of Modi'im

Strength
Great revolt: 30,000 (Beth Horon) – 60,000 (siege of Jerusalem) Kitos War: forces of the eastern legions Bar Kokhba revolt: 6–7 full legions with cohorts and auxiliaries of 5–6 additional legions – about 120,000 total.	Great revolt: 25,000+ Jewish militias 20,000 Idumeans Kitos War: loosely organized tens of thousands Bar Kokhba revolt: 200,000–400,000^{b} militiamen

Casualties and losses
Great revolt: Legio XII Fulminata lost its aquila and Syrian contingent destroyed – about 20,000 casualties; thousands of Roman civilians slain Kitos War: 240,000 killed in Cyprus^{a}, 200,000 killed in Cyrenaica^{a} Bar Kokhba revolt: Legio XXII Deiotariana destroyed, Legio IX Hispana possibly disbanded, Legio X Fretensis – sustained heavy casualties	Great revolt: 1,356,460 Jewish civilians and militia killed by Romans – perhaps hundreds of thousands of non-Jewish civilians (mostly trapped visitors) killed; enslavement of 97,000–99,000^{c} Kitos War: 200,000 killed Annihilation of Jewish communities in Cyprus, Cyrenaica and Alexandria Bar Kokhba revolt: 580,000^{a} killed, 985 Jewish strongholds and villages destroyed^{a}
- 350,000–1,400,000 fatalities
- [a] per Cassius Dio [b] according to Rabbinic sources [c] per Josephus

The Jewish–Roman wars were a series of large-scale revolts by the Jews of Judaea against the Roman Empire between 66 and 135 CE. The conflict was driven by Jewish aspirations to restore the political independence lost when Rome conquered the Hasmonean kingdom, and unfolded over three major uprisings: the First Jewish–Roman War (66–73 CE), the Kitos War (116–118 CE) and the Bar Kokhba Revolt (132–136 CE). Some historians also include the Diaspora Revolt (115–117 CE) which coincided with the Kitos War, when Jewish communities across the Eastern Mediterranean rose up against Roman rule.

The Jewish–Roman wars had a devastating impact on the Jewish people, turning them from a major population in the Eastern Mediterranean into a dispersed and persecuted minority. The First Jewish–Roman War ended with the devastating siege and destruction of Jerusalem in 70 CE, including the burning of the Second Temple—the center of Jewish religious and national life. Roman forces destroyed other towns and villages throughout Judaea, causing massive loss of life and displacement of the population. The surviving Jewish community lost all political autonomy under direct Roman rule. The later Bar Kokhba Revolt proved even more devastating. The Romans' brutal suppression of this uprising led to the near-total depopulation of Judea through a combination of battlefield casualties, mass killings, and the widespread enslavement of survivors.

These catastrophic events expanded and strengthened the Jewish diaspora, driving profound religious and cultural transformations that would shape Judaism for millennia. With the Temple's offering system no longer viable, other forms of worship developed, centered on prayer, Torah study, and communal synagogue gatherings, enabling Jewish communities to preserve their identity and practices despite dispersion. As Jewish life in Judaea became untenable, two major shifts occurred: within the Land of Israel, the cultural center shifted northward to Galilee, while internationally, Babylonia and other diaspora communities across the Mediterranean and Near East gained unprecedented importance, eventually comprising the majority of the Jewish population. These developments laid the foundation for Rabbinic Judaism, which emerged as the dominant form of Judaism in late antiquity and was responsible for the codification of the Mishnah and Talmud.

== Sequence ==
The Jewish–Roman wars include the following:

- First Jewish–Roman War (66–73)—also called the First Jewish Revolt or the Great Jewish Revolt, spanning from the 66 insurrection, through the 67 fall of the Galilee, the destruction of Jerusalem and the Second Temple and institution of the Fiscus Judaicus in 70, and finally the fall of Masada in 73.
- Diaspora Revolt (115–117)—known as the "Rebellion of the Exile" and sometimes called the Second Jewish–Roman War; includes the Kitos War in Judaea.
- Bar Kokhba Revolt (132–136)—also called the Second Jewish–Roman War (if the Kitos War is not counted), or the Third (if it is).

== Background ==
Rome gained control of Judaea, then an independent kingdom ruled by the Hasmonean dynasty, in 63 BCE. That year, the Roman general Pompey intervened in a succession war between brothers Hyrcanus and Aristobulus, who were fighting for the throne following the death of their mother, Queen Salome Alexandra. Pompey besieged and conquered Jerusalem, committing a religious violation by entering the Temple's Holy of Holies, a space reserved exclusively for the High Priest who entered it only once a year on Yom Kippur. After the Roman conquest, Judaea became a client state: the monarchy was abolished, and Hyrcanus was reduced to serving solely as High Priest. Parts of the former kingdom were detached and incorporated into the province of Syria, likely in an attempt to weaken the Jewish population economically and pave the way for future annexation. Fifteen years later, Julius Caesar visited the region and improved Jewish status, restoring some territories to Jewish control and appointing Hyrcanus as ethnarch.

Antigonus II Mattathias, Aristobolus's son, reclaimed Judaea's throne in 40 BCE with popular and Parthian support. Meanwhile, the Roman Senate appointed Herod, an Idumean noble from a family that had converted to Judaism a century prior, as "King of the Jews". It took Herod three years to conquer the kingdom, capturing Jerusalem through siege and ending Antigonus' brief reign. He ruled Judaea as a client kingdom, maintaining close ties with Rome, though he faced widespread Jewish resentment. After his death in 4 BCE, his realm was divided among his sons: Archelaus became ethnarch of Judaea, Samaria, and Idumaea, while Herod Antipas governed Galilee and Perea. Archelaus' misrule led to his removal within a decade, and in 6 CE Judaea was annexed as a Roman province.

In 6 CE, Quirinius, the governor of Syria, conducted a census in Judaea, triggering an uprising led by Judas of Galilee. Judas led what Josephus described as the 'fourth philosophy,' rejecting Roman rule and affirmed God's sole kingship. During the tenure of Pontius Pilate (c. 26–36 CE), several incidents provoked unrest: the introduction of military standards into Jerusalem, the diversion of Temple funds to build an aqueduct, and a soldier's indecent exposure near the Temple.

Although initially pacified (the years between 7 and 26 being relatively quiet), the province continued to be a source of trouble under Emperor Caligula (after 37). The cause of tensions in the east of the empire was complicated, involving the spread of Greek culture, Roman law, and the rights of Jews in the empire. Caligula did not trust the prefect of Roman Egypt, Aulus Avilius Flaccus. Flaccus had been loyal to Tiberius, had conspired against Caligula's mother, and had connections with Egyptian separatists. In 38 Caligula sent Herod Agrippa to Alexandria unannounced to check on Flaccus. According to Philo, the visit was met with jeers from the Greek population, who saw Agrippa as the king of the Jews. Flaccus tried to placate both the Greek population and Caligula by having statues of the emperor placed in Jewish synagogues. As a result, extensive religious riots broke out in the city. Caligula responded by removing Flaccus from his position and executing him. In Antiquities of the Jews, Josephus mentions that in 39 CE Agrippa accused Herod Antipas, the tetrarch of Galilee and Peraea, of planning a rebellion against Roman rule with the help of Parthia. Antipas confessed, and Caligula exiled him. Agrippa was rewarded with his territories.

Riots again erupted in Alexandria in 38 between Jews and Greeks. Jews were accused of not honoring the emperor. Disputes occurred also in Jamnia. Jews were angered by the erection of a clay altar and destroyed it. In response, Caligula ordered the erection of a statue of himself in the Temple in Jerusalem, a demand in conflict with Jewish monotheism. In this context, Philo writes that Caligula "regarded the Jews with most especial suspicion, as if they were the only persons who cherished wishes opposed to his". Fearing civil war if the order were carried out, Publius Petronius—governor of Roman Syria—delayed implementing it for nearly a year. Agrippa finally convinced Caligula to reverse the order. However, only Caligula's death at the hands of Roman conspirators in 41 prevented a full-scale war in Judaea, that might have spread to the rest of the eastern part of the empire.

Caligula's death did not stop the tensions completely, and in 46 an insurrection led by two brothers, the Jacob and Simon uprising, broke out in the Judea province. The revolt, mainly in the Galilee, began as sporadic insurgency; when it climaxed in 48 it was quickly put down by Roman authorities. Both Simon and Jacob were executed.

== First Jewish–Roman War ==
In the spring and summer of 66 CE, a chain of events in Caesarea and Jerusalem sparked what would become the First Jewish–Roman War. The conflict began with a local dispute in Caesarea over land adjacent to a synagogue, which escalated when a Greek resident deliberately provoked the Jewish community by sacrificing birds at the synagogue entrance. The situation worsened when procurator Gessius Florus plundered the Jerusalem Temple treasury and ordered brutal crackdowns that killed thousands in the city. After Agrippa II, a pro-Roman Jewish king, failed to relax the crowds and fled the city, Eleazar ben Hanania, the Temple captain, halted sacrifices for Rome—effectively declaring rebellion. The crisis spiraled into widespread ethnic violence across the region, with massacres of Jewish communities in several mixed cities, while Jewish forces retaliated against Greek cities and seized key fortresses. In Jerusalem, the rebels drove out and killed the remaining Roman forces; afterward, Menahem ben Judah, leader of the Sicarii, attempted to seize power but was assassinated, leading to the Sicarii's expulsion to the desert fortress of Masada.

At this stage, the Roman legate of Syria, Cestius Gallus, assembled a force including the Legio XII Fulminata and auxiliary troops from regional vassals, devastating Jewish settlements such as Chabulon, Jaffa and Lydda. However, after initial successes, he withdrew from the city for unclear reasons and was decisively ambushed at the Bethoron Pass, suffering losses equivalent to a full legion. This unexpected defeat proved a turning point, bolstering rebel morale and leading to the establishment of a provisional government in Jerusalem. Led by former High Priest Ananus ben Ananus, this new administration divided the country into military districts, appointed regional commanders, and began minting coins with nationalist Hebrew inscriptions, such as "For the Freedom of Zion". While the government publicly supported the revolt, they seem to have secretly hoped to restore order and negotiate with Rome. During this period, several rebel leaders emerged, including John of Gischala in Galilee and Simon Bar Giora in Judea.

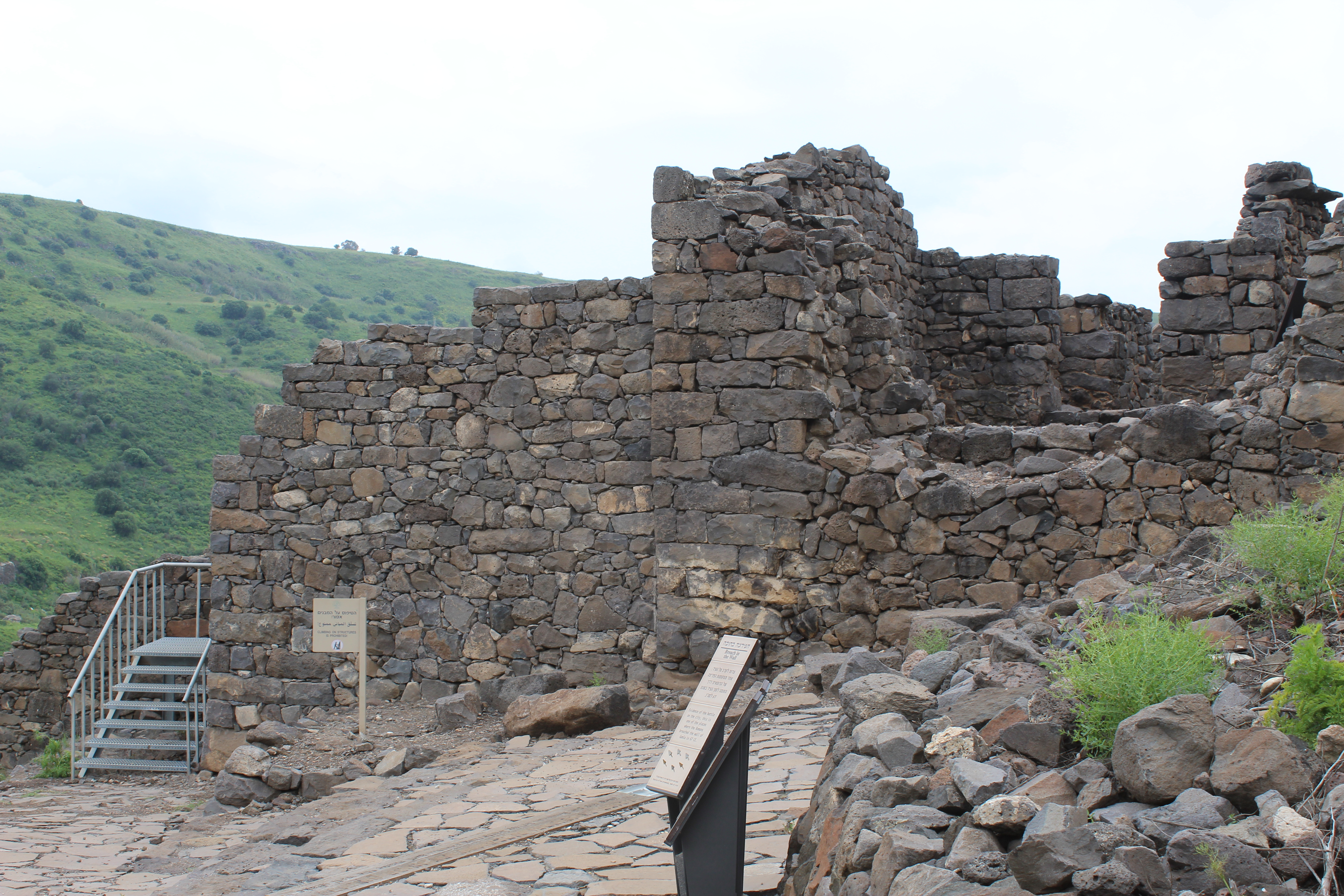
Roman breach in the walls of Gamla, Golan, captured after a prolonged siege in late 67 CE

After Gallus' defeat, Nero appointed the experienced commander Vespasian to lead the Roman response. He assembled a massive force including three legions and numerous auxiliary troops. Arriving in Akko-Ptolemais in the summer of 67 CE, Vespasian launched a systematic campaign in the Galilee. Yodfat, a key stronghold, fell after a grueling 47-day siege, with thousands killed or captured. Josephus, who had been the commander of the Galilee, surrendered after the city's fall and later gained Roman favor by claiming prophetic visions of Vespasian's rise to power, ultimately becoming a historian under Flavian patronage and the main source for the war. Taricheae mounted fierce resistance before falling in an event of mass killing, with its survivors facing execution, slavery, or other severe punishments. Gamla, a fortified city in the Golan, was the next Roman target. After a prolonged siege, it fell in the autumn of 67 CE. Despite suffering heavy casualties, the Romans succeeded, leaving the city in ruins and its population nearly exterminated. Other Roman successes included the recapture of Mount Tabor, Gush Halav, Mount Gerizim, and Jaffa, where they suppressed rebel piracy and restored imperial control.

While the Romans pacified the north, Jerusalem plunged into civil war as refugees and zealots poured in from the Galilee. The radical Zealot faction, allied with John of Gischala, who arrived in the city with his followers from the north, overthrew the moderate government. With Idumeans joining the Zealots, Ananus ben Ananus was killed, and his forces suffered heavy casualties; many moderates were executed or forced to flee. The Zealots instituted revolutionary changes, including selecting a new High Priest by lot rather than from traditional aristocratic families. Upon learning of the turmoil in Jerusalem from deserters, Vespasian chose not to advance on the city, reasoning that internal conflict would weaken the Jews.

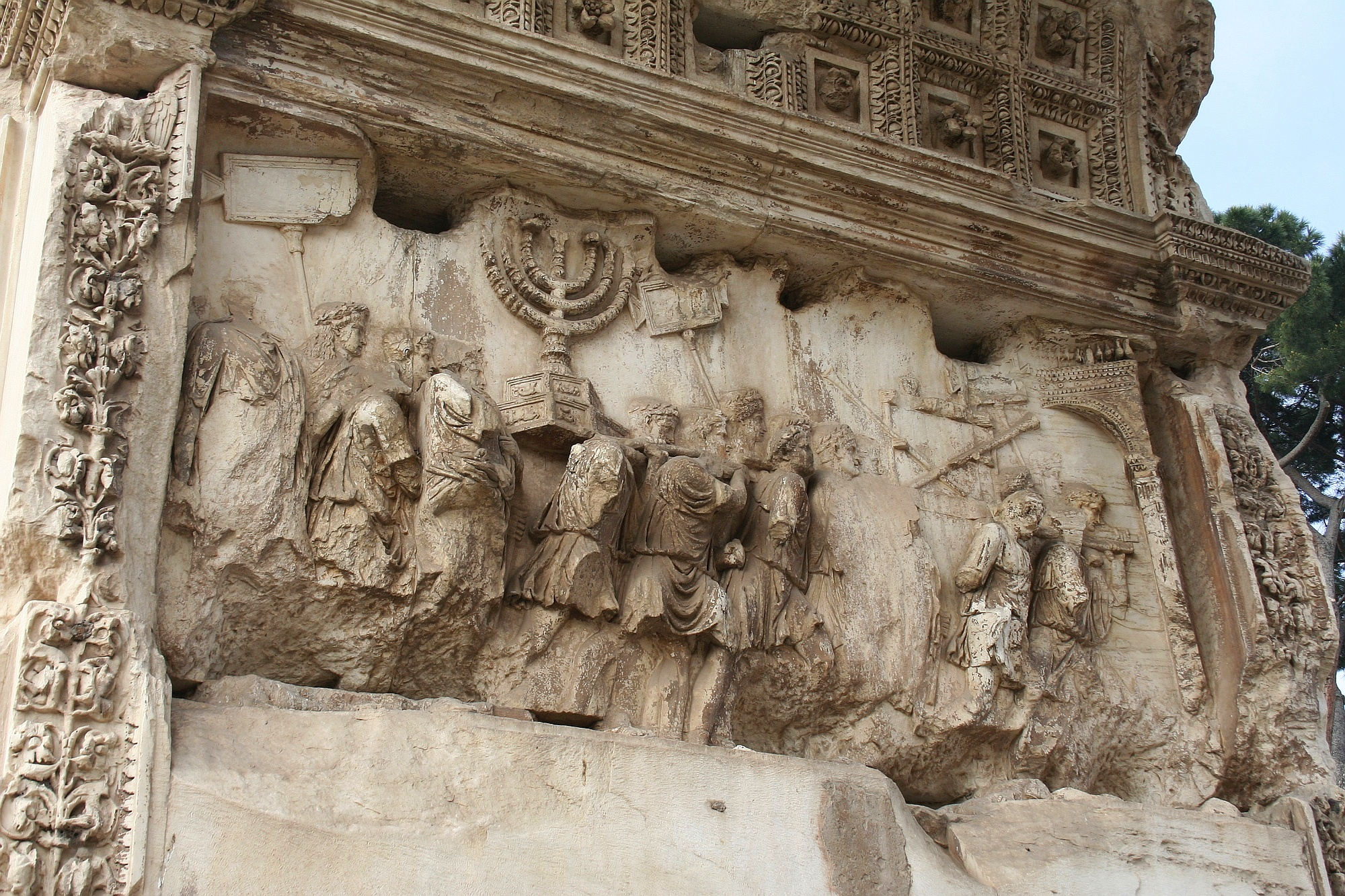
A relief on the Arch of Titus in Rome, depicting the Temple menorah and other spoils from Jerusalem carried during the triumph of 71 CE

After a lull in military operations due to civil war and political instability in Rome, Vespasian returned to Rome and was proclaimed emperor in 69 CE. After Vespasian's departure, his son Titus besieged the center of rebel resistance in Jerusalem in early 70. As conditions within Jerusalem deteriorated catastrophically—with widespread famine, disease, and factional violence—the Romans employed psychological warfare, including mass crucifixions of escapees and parades displaying their military might. While the first two walls of Jerusalem were breached within three weeks, a stubborn stand prevented the Roman Army from breaking the third and thickest wall. However, they eventually penetrated the Jewish defenses, fighting through to the Temple Mount and destroying the Temple. The Romans then methodically razed the rest of the city, sparing only the Western Wall and a few towers. Archaeological findings corroborate these accounts of widespread destruction. Titus returned to Rome, where he and his father celebrated a triumph in the summer of 71, during which the Temple menorah and other spoils from the Temple were paraded through the city. The triumph also featured hundreds of captives, including Simon bar Giora, who was executed at the end of the procession.

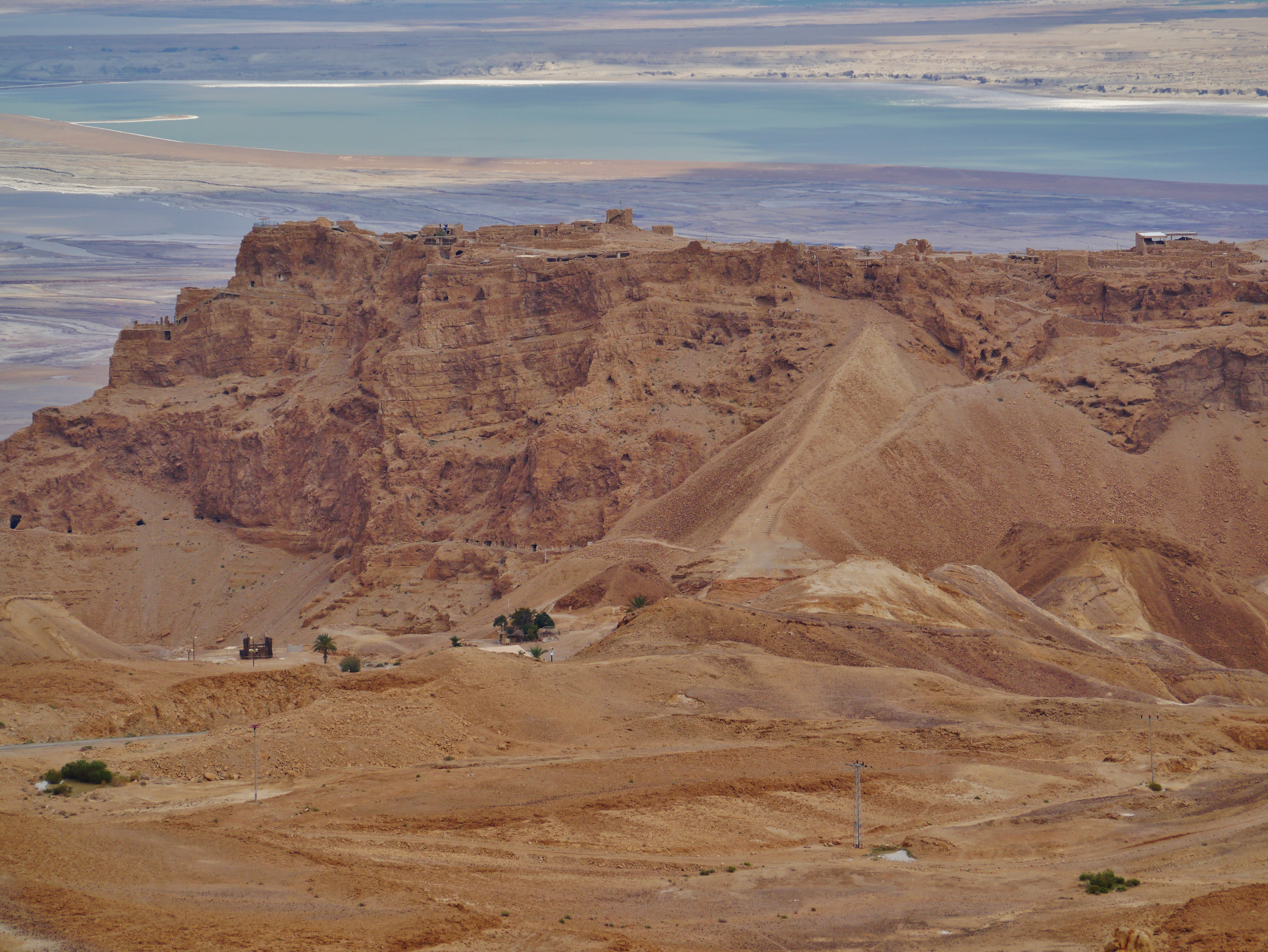
Masada, a fortress on the southwest coast of the Dead Sea, marked the final stand of the revolt, falling to the Romans in 73 or 74 CE.

With Jerusalem destroyed, the Romans launched an operation aimed at eliminating the last pockets of resistance: the rebel-held desert fortresses of Herodium, Machaerus, and Masada. Under Sextus Lucilius Bassus, the Romans swiftly captured Herodium, secured the surrender of Machaerus, and then eliminated rebel forces in the Forest of Jardes. After Bassus's death, his successor Lucius Flavius Silva led the siege of Masada in 73 or 74 CE. This massive engineering effort on an isolated, fortified rocky plateau near the Dead Sea included a complete circumvallation wall and an enormous siege ramp, which still stands today. According to Josephus, when the Romans finally breached the fortress walls, they discovered that the Sicarii defenders, led by Eleazar ben Yair, had chosen mass suicide over capture—960 men, women, and children died by their own hands, with only seven survivors.

== Diaspora Revolt ==
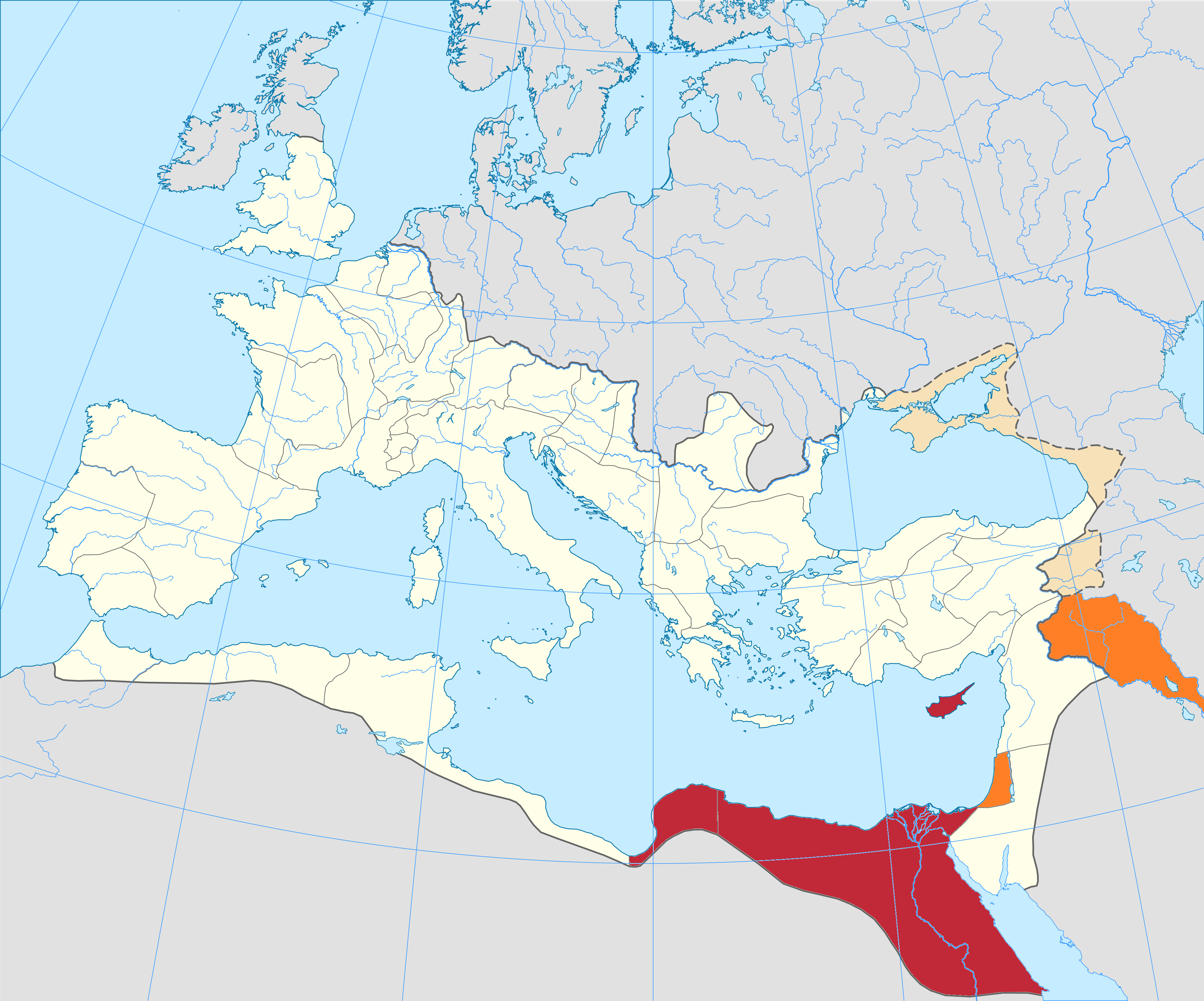
Roman provinces involved in the Diaspora Revolt (115–117)

In 115 CE, a wave of large-scale Jewish uprisings, known as the "Diaspora Revolt", erupted almost simultaneously across several provinces in the Eastern Mediterranean. At that time, Emperor Trajan was further east, engaged in a military campaign against the Parthian Empire in Mesopotamia. The uprisings, which followed decades of ethnic tensions that sometimes escalated into violence, appear to have been influenced by events in Judaea, including the destruction of the Temple and the arrival of insurgents after the First Jewish–Roman War, spreading revolutionary ideas among local Jewish communities. Also fueling the unrest were messianic expectations of divine redemption, the humiliating Jewish Tax, and what seems to be an attempt to create a mass movement of Jews from the diaspora into Judaea.

In Libya, Jewish forces launched attacks against Greek and Roman populations under the leadership of either Andreas (according to Dio/Xiphilinus) or Lukuas (according to Eusebius) – possibly the same individual known by both names. Dio describes extreme brutality by the Jewish forces in the Libyan region of Cyrenaica, but these accounts are likely exaggerated. In Egypt, the uprising reportedly began with clashes between Jewish communities and their Greek neighbors, escalating when Lukuas and his followers arrived from Cyrenaica. They plundered the countryside and overcame local resistance, prompting Greeks, supported by Egyptian peasants and Romans, to retaliate with a massacre of Alexandria's Jews. In both provinces, the Jews destroyed public sites such as the shrine of Nemesis near Alexandria and temples in Libya, while also securing control of waterways in Egypt. In Cyprus, Jewish rebels under Artemion's leadership reportedly devastated the island and the city of Salamis. Eusebius also mentions Roman violence against Jews in Mesopotamia, but modern analysis of the available evidence suggests this was part of broader local uprisings against Roman rule, with Jewish involvement likely influenced by their favorable status under Parthian control.

The uprisings in Egypt and Libya were suppressed by Marcius Turbo, who was redirected from the campaign against the Parthians. In late 116 or early 117, he arrived in Egypt with substantial land and naval forces, including Roman legions, auxiliaries, and local recruits. Turbo carried out extensive and brutal military campaigns, reportedly annihilating the Jewish population. In Mesopotamia, another general, Lusius Quietus, was involved in subduing local insurgency. Following this, he was appointed governor of Judaea. It was around this time that localized unrest, referred to in rabbinic sources as the Kitos War after Quietus, occurred in the province. However, the evidence in ancient sources is so limited that the details of these events remain unclear. The uprisings in the diaspora were likely quelled by summer or autumn 117 CE, though it is possible that unrest in Egypt continued into the winter of 117/118 CE.

The aftermath brought devastating consequences for Jewish communities. A campaign of ethnic cleansing led to the near-complete extermination of Jews from Cyrenaica, Cyprus, and Egypt. Trajan implemented a new registry cataloging confiscated Jewish properties. Alexandria's wealthy and influential Jewish community was effectively destroyed, with survivors limited to those who fled early in the uprising. The city's grand synagogue, celebrated in the Talmud, was destroyed, and its Jewish court likely abolished. Some Jews may have escaped to Judaea and Syria. The physical impact was equally severe. Archaeological evidence shows such extensive damage to Cyrene that Hadrian needed to rebuild the city early in his reign. A festival commemorating the victory over the Jews continued in Egypt eighty years later, c. 200 CE. In Cyprus, Jews were permanently banned; Cassius Dio noted that even in his time, during the third century, Jews faced death if found on the island, even due to shipwreck. Jewish communities only gradually re-established themselves: in Egypt during the third century (though never regaining their former influence), and in Cyprus and Cyrenaica by the fourth century.

== Bar Kokhba Revolt ==
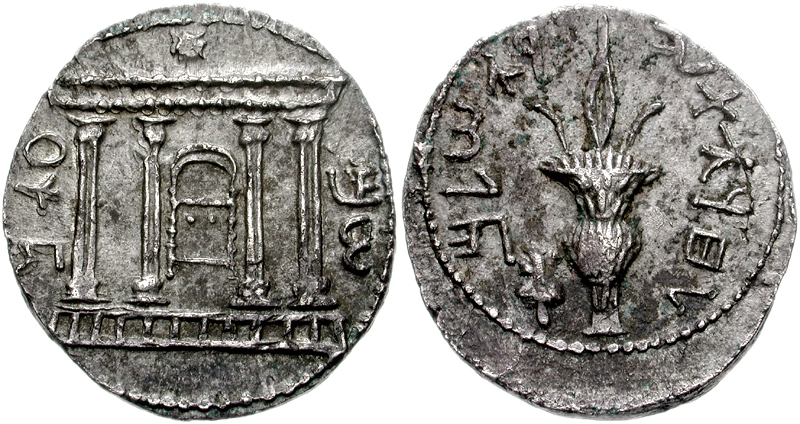
During the Bar Kokhba Revolt (132 CE), Jews briefly established an independent state, minting coins like this one, depicting the former Temple and a lulav.

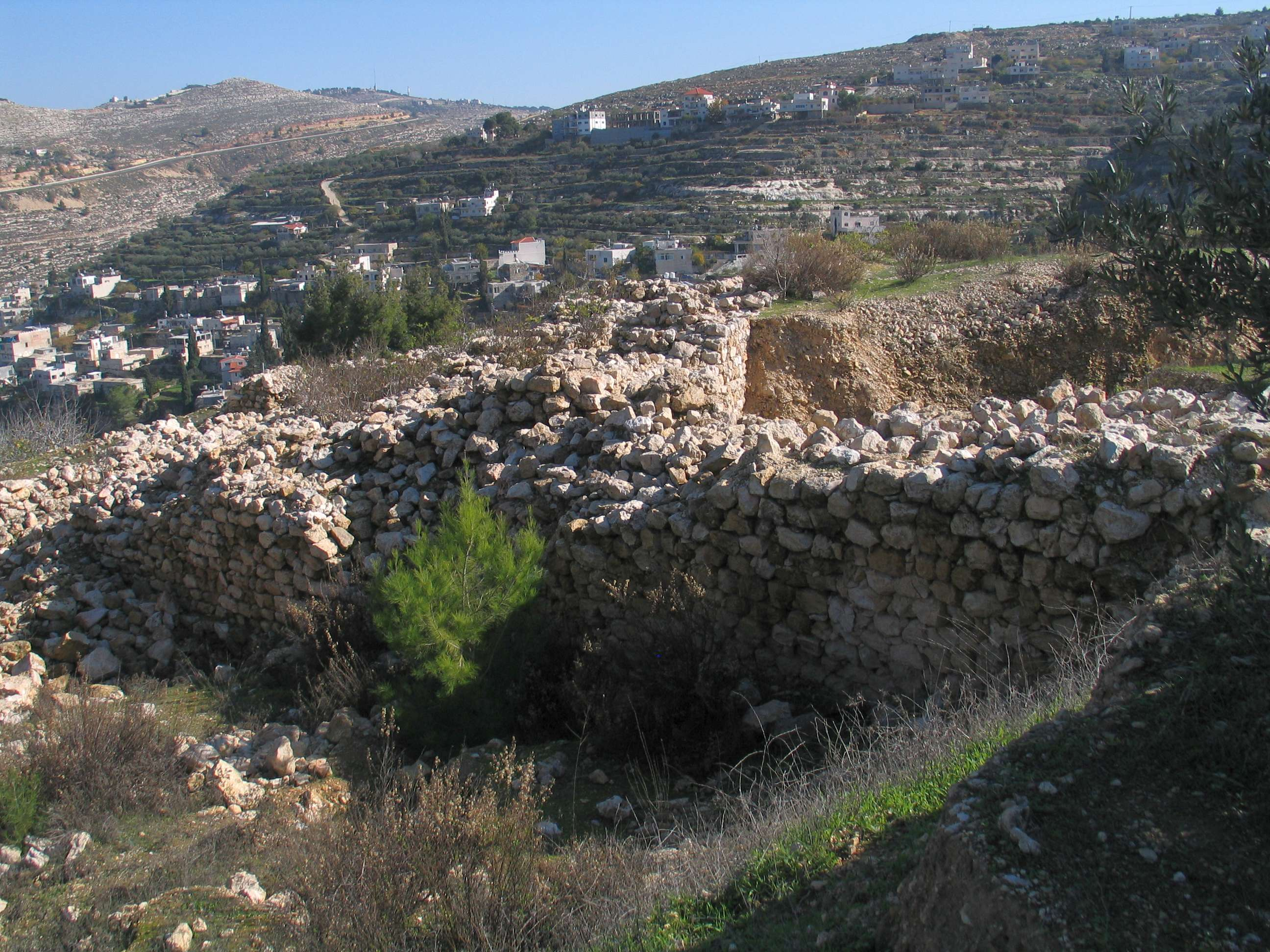
The revolt was brutally crushed by the Romans, nearly depopulating Judea. Pictured is Betar, a key stronghold of the revolt, which fell around 135 CE.

The Bar Kokhba Revolt (132–135/136 CE) was the last major Jewish revolt and organized effort to regain national independence. The immediate catalysts for the rebellion included Emperor Hadrian's decision to establish the pagan colony of Aelia Capitolina on the ruins of Jerusalem, extinguishing Jewish hopes for the Temple's restoration, and possibly also the imposition of a ban on circumcision.

Under the leadership of Simon bar Kokhba, the rebels launched a highly organized resistance, initially achieving substantial military success. Unlike previous revolts, Jewish forces were well-prepared, employing guerrilla tactics, fortified hideouts, and an extensive network of underground hideout systems and tunnels. Bar Kokhba was declared "Nasi (Prince) of Israel" and was supported by prominent figures, including Rabbi Akiva, one of the most revered sages of the time, who identified him as the Messiah, a figure in Jewish eschatology who stems from the Davidic line and will restore the Kingdom of Israel and usher the Messianic age. The rebels succeeded in establishing a short-lived independent Jewish state, exerting control over much of southern and central Judaea. As a symbol of sovereignty, they issued coinage bearing Jewish iconography and inscriptions affirming independence, reminiscent of those minted during the First Jewish Revolt.

The insurgency presented an acute challenge to the Romans. Hadrian took the time to assemble a vast force under Sextus Julius Severus, comprising six full legions, auxiliaries, and reinforcements from up to six additional legions, and then launched a campaign of systematic devastation of Judaea. In 135 CE, after a brutal siege, the Jewish fortress of Betar fell and Bar Kokhba died. Some rebels, having retreated into refuge caves in the Judaean Desert, were besieged and starved by Roman forces.

The revolt had catastrophic consequences for the Jewish population in Judaea, resulting in massive loss of life, widespread enslavement, and extensive forced displacement. The scale of devastation surpassed even that of the First Jewish–Roman War, leaving Judea proper in a state of desolation. Shimeon Applebaum estimates that about two-thirds of Judaea's Jewish population perished in the revolt. Within a century after the revolt ended, the Roman historian Cassius Dio (c. 155–235) wrote: "50 of their most important outposts and 985 of their most famous villages were razed to the ground. 580,000 men were slain in the various raids and battles, and the number of those that perished by famine, disease and fire was past finding out. Thus, nearly the whole of Judaea was made desolate." Archaeological evidence indicates that many sites in Judea suffered damage, destruction, or abandonment, to the extent that Jewish settlement in Judea was almost completely eradicated by the revolt's end. Recent works, including one by Hannah Cotton and another by Dvir Raviv and Chaim Ben David, support the figures given by Dio, concluding that his data was based on Roman records available at the time.

== Aftermath ==
The Jewish-Roman wars profoundly transformed the Jewish people, converting a once-prominent population in the Eastern Mediterranean into a dispersed and persecuted minority. Classicist Hannah Cotton characterized the First Jewish Revolt and the Bar Kokhba Revolt as "two major national and religious revolts—two great catastrophes which changed the history of this province—indeed the entire course of Jewish history." Classicist historian Fergus Millar similarly describes these two revolts as "religious and nationalist movements of a strikingly modern kind", adding that "they were also almost unique instances of state-formation within the Roman Empire."

These conflicts caused extensive casualties and destruction throughout Judea and led to mass displacement and the enslavement of many. While the First Jewish-Roman War devastated Jerusalem—destroying the center of Jewish political, national, and religious life—the Bar Kokhba revolt had even more catastrophic consequences, effectively depopulating Judea, the core of the Jewish homeland, of its Jewish population. The defeat also ended aspirations for Jewish political independence in the region for nearly two millennia.

=== Impact on the Jewish population ===
The consequences for the Jews of Judaea were catastrophic, characterized by widespread destruction and mass slaughter, which some historians regard as genocidal in scope. According to surviving ancient accounts, hundreds of thousands of Jews perished, while countless others were enslaved or exiled. The region of Judea, distinct from the broader Roman province, was heavily depopulated, with surviving Jewish communities primarily concentrated in Galilee. As a result of the wars, many Jews dispersed from Judaea to regions such as North Africa, Spain, Greece, Italy, Babylonia, and Arabia, expanding the Jewish diaspora.

The defeat marked a turning point in Jewish history, leading to a shift in messianic expectations and the development of a more cautious, conservative rabbinical approach to political resistance. The war and its aftermath accelerated the emergence of early Christianity as a distinct religion from Judaism. Roman reprisals included severe religious restrictions, such as bans on circumcision and Shabbat observance. Hadrian completed the transformation of Jerusalem into Aelia Capitolina, barring Jews from entering and settling foreign populations there. At the former Jewish sanctuary on the Temple Mount he installed two statues, one of Jupiter and another of himself.

=== Renaming of Judaea to Syria Palaestina ===
A further and more enduring punishment was implemented by the Romans following the revolt. In an effort to erase the memory of Judea and Ancient Israel, according to the prevailing scholarly view, the province of Judaea—whose name carried a clear ethnic association with the Jews, being derived from the Latin Iudaei—was officially renamed Syria Palaestina, a name without explicit ethnic connotations. Although the Romans often renamed provinces, this instance is notable as the only recorded case in which a province's name was changed specifically in response to a rebellion—a measure not taken after revolts in provinces such as Britannia or Germania. Historian Seth Schwartz writes that the name was intended to "celebrate the de-Judaization of the province."

David Jacobson contends that Hadrian's choice of Syria Palaestina was a rational administrative decision, reflecting the territorial scope of the province beyond Judea proper. He also notes that the name had ancient precedents and was historically linked to the broader region of greater Israel. Louis Feldman writes that the aim was to "obliterate the Jewish character of the land, with the name of the nearest tribe being applied to the entire area", adding that the term Palestina had previously referred primarily to the coastal region associated with the Philistines and that early Roman authors typically distinguished it from Judaea. (Note: Men Herodotus in the fifth century BCE mentions Palestine he refers only to the coastal area, so called because it had been inhabited by the Philistines; or he is speaking loosely, since the only part of the area that he had visited was apparently along the coast. ... Moreover, writers on geography in the first century clearly differentiate Judaea from Palestine. Even vicious anti-Jewish writers, such as Apion, Chaeremon, and Seneca in the first century, generally do not use the term Palestine. Palestinian as a noun does not occur in all antiquity. Coins of Hadrian issued before the Bar Kochba rebellion in 132 C.E. refer to Judaea; within a few years after the rebellion the name of Judaea was officially changed to Palestine, the aim being to obliterate the Jewish character of the land, with the name of the nearest tribe being applied to the entire area. Yet, even after the name was officially changed, some inscriptions, as well as such literary figures ... still refer to Judaea.) Historian Werner Eck rejects the possibility that the new name reflected demographic changes following the reduction of the Jewish population—noting that a similar case in the history of Pannonia did not lead to a name change—and argues instead that it was exceptionally intended as a punishment directed against the Jews.

=== Jewish commemoration of the events ===
The destruction of the Second Temple left a profound and lasting impact on Jewish tradition, shaping customs and observances that commemorate its loss. It is formally observed on Tisha B'Av, a major Jewish fast day that also marks the destruction of Solomon's Temple, along with other catastrophic events in Jewish history, including the expulsion of Jews from Spain. The Western Wall, the most significant surviving remnant of the Second Temple, has long been a focal point for Jewish prayer and mourning, symbolizing both the destruction of the Jewish homeland and hopes for its restoration. It has sometimes been referred to as the 'Wailing Wall' due to the lamentations historically performed there. During Jewish wedding ceremonies, the groom breaks a glass underfoot to recall the temple's destruction. Other mourning traditions include leaving a section of the home unpainted or refraining from wearing full jewelry on joyous occasions.

The Tosefta records 2nd century sage Rabbi Ishmael comparing "the day the Temple was destroyed" to the aftermath of the Bar Kokhba revolt, describing it as a time when the Romans were "uprooting the Torah from among us." A Tannaitic tradition attributed to Rabbi Akiva marks the Ninth of Av (Tisha B'Av) as the date of both Temple destructions; the Mishnah later expands this commemoration to include events from the Bar Kokhba revolt: "Betar was captured and the city was ploughed", referring to the fall of the final stronghold and the Roman transformation of Jerusalem into Aelia Capitolina. Another passage in the Mishnah presents the three Jewish revolts as each leading to added mourning practices in the context of weddings: as a result of the "war of Vespasian", "they forbade the crowns of the grooms and the drum"; following the "war of Quietus" (though in another manuscript, Titus), "they forbade the crowns of the brides", while "in the final war", they "forbade brides to ride in a litter inside the city."

=== Impact on the Jewish religion ===
The destruction of the Temple was a watershed moment in Jewish history, transforming both religious practice and social structure. The Temple stood at the heart of Jewish religious and national life, serving as the center for sacrificial worship that had been central to Judaism for centuries, and as the primary symbol of Jewish sovereignty. Its loss created a vacuum that demanded a reimagining of Jewish life. This episode also ended Jewish sectarianism: The Sadducees, whose authority and prestige were linked to the Temple, vanished as a distinct group, as did the ascetic Essenes. (Note: Goodman, however, notes that no direct sources explicitly document the disappearance of the Essenes and Sadducees following the destruction, with the first clear evidence for their demise appearing in the 4th century, though it does not provide a specific date. Instead, he suggests that hints in later rabbinic and patristic literature imply the potential persistence of Jewish sectarianism, including groups related to the Sadducees and Essenes, for years, or even centuries, after the Temple's destruction.) However, the Pharisees, who had generally opposed the first revolt, emerged as the dominant religious force. Their emphasis on prayer, scriptural interpretation, and religious law proved crucial for Judaism's survival. Under their successors, the rabbis, Judaism underwent a reconstruction that enabled it to flourish without its central institution. This transformation centered on elements that could be practiced anywhere: prayer as a substitute for sacrifice, Torah study, and the performance of good deeds. The synagogue, which had already existed as an institution during the Second Temple period, grew in prominence, becoming a central venue for Jewish worship and communal life. These changes established patterns of religious practice that would sustain and shape Jewish life for millennia, even as Jews faced further exile and dispersion from the Land of Israel.

According to rabbinic tradition, a key moment in this transformation took place during the siege of Jerusalem, when the Pharisaic sage Yohanan ben Zakkai had himself smuggled out of the city in a coffin. After meeting with Vespasian and prophesying his rise to the imperial throne, Yohanan secured permission to establish an academy at the small town of Yavne. This institution became a leading center of rabbinic activity, where significant enactments were introduced to reshape Jewish life and observance without the temple. The priestly class relocated to Galilee and various diaspora communities, where they contributed to the development of synagogue liturgy and may have played a role in the preparation of biblical translations. Following the Bar Kokhba revolt, major centers of Jewish learning emerged in the Galilee and Babylonia, where scholars compiled the foundational texts of rabbinic Judaism: the Mishnah (early 3rd century) and later, the Jerusalem and Babylonian Talmuds, which became primary sources of Jewish law and religious guidance.

In the long term, by removing Judaism's geographic anchor in Jerusalem and the Temple, the suppression of the Jewish revolts impacted both practice and identity in the Jewish diaspora. Jewish communities scattered across the Roman Empire underwent a gradual transformation visible through an increase in biblically derived Hebrew names, inscriptions referring to "the Law," mentions of rabbis and the Patriarchate, and the widespread use of symbols such as the menorah and shofar. Pre-existing ethnic ties, activated by heightened social tension, persecutions, and growing receptiveness to change accelerated the diffusion of rabbinic reforms, and made Jews feel a stronger need to assert their Jewish identity. This process began prior to the rise of state-sponsored Christian hostility, though it was subsequently intensified by it. These reforms were transmitted through traveling rabbis, synagogue leaders, and migration, eventually bringing Diaspora communities under the influence of the major rabbinic centers in Galilee and Babylonia. Following the dissolution of the Patriarchate by Byzantine authorities, leadership shifted definitively toward the Jewish centers in Babylonia which continued to thrive under Sasanian rule.

== See also ==
- History of the Jews in the Roman Empire
- Second Temple
- Second Temple period
- Jerusalem during the Second Temple period
- Timeline of the Second Temple period
- Siege of Jerusalem (63 BC)
- Siege of Jerusalem (37 BC)
- Jewish revolt against Constantius Gallus, 352 CE
- Samaritan revolts, 484–572 CE
- Jewish revolt against Heraclius, 614–617/625

== Bibliography ==
- Barclay, John M.G. (1998). Jews in the Mediterranean Diaspora: From Alexander to Trajan (323 BCE–117 CE). Edinburgh: T&T Clark. ISBN 978-0567-08651-8.
- Beard, Mary (2002). "The Triumph of Flavius Josephus". In Boyle, A. J.; Dominik, W. J. (eds.). Flavian Rome: Culture, Image, Text. Brill. pp. 543–558. ISBN 978-9-004-11188-2.
- Bennett, Julian (2005) [1997]. Trajan Optimus Princeps: A Life and Times (e-Library ed.). London and New York: Routledge. ISBN 0-203-36056-7.
- Berlin, Andrea M.; Overman, J. Andrew, eds. (2002). "Introduction". The First Jewish Revolt: Archaeology, History, and Ideology. London and New York: Routledge. ISBN 978-0-415-62024-6.
- Cohen, Shaye J. D. (1984). "The Significance of Yavneh: Pharisees, Rabbis, and the End of Jewish Sectarianism". Hebrew Union College Annual. 55: 27–53. JSTOR 23507609.
- Cohen, Shaye J. D. (1999). "The Temple and the synagogue". In Horbury, William; Davies, W. D.; Sturdy, John (eds.). The Early Roman Period. The Cambridge History of Judaism. Vol. 3. Cambridge University Press. pp. 298–325. ISBN 9781139053662.
- Cohen, Shaye J. D. (2014). From Maccabees To Mishnah (3rd ed.). Louisville, Kentucky: Westminster John Knox Press. ISBN 978-0-664-23904-6.
- Collar, Anna (2013). "The Jewish Diaspora in the west: the rabbinic reforms, ethnicity and the (re?)activation of Jewish identity". Religious Networks in the Roman Empire: The Spread of New Ideas. Cambridge: Cambridge University Press. pp. 219–221. ISBN 978-1-107-04344-2.
- Cotton, Hannah (2007). "The impact of the Roman army in the province of Judaea/Syria Palaestina". The Impact of the Roman Army (200 BC–AD 476): Economic, Social, Political, Religious and Cultural Aspects. Brill. pp. 393–407. ISBN 978-90-04-16044-6.
- Cotton, Hannah M. (2009). Eck, Werner (ed.). "Some Aspects of the Roman Administration of Judaea/Syria-Palaestina". Jahrhundert. 1, Lokale Autonomie und Ordnungsmacht in den kaiserzeitlichen Provinzen (3). Oldenbourg Wissenschaftsverlag: 75–92. doi:10.1524/9783486596014-007. ISBN 978-3-486-59601-4.
- Cotton, Hannah M. (2022). Pogorelsky, Ofer (ed.). Roman Rule and Jewish Life: Collected Papers. Studia Judaica. Vol. 89. De Gruyter. doi:10.1515/9783110770438. ISBN 978-3-110-77043-8.
- Davies, Gwyn (2023). "Stamping Out the Embers: Roman "Mopping-Up" Operations at the End of the First Jewish Revolt". In Mizzi, Dennis; Grey, Matthew; Rassalle, Tine (eds.). Pushing Sacred Boundaries in Early Judaism and the Ancient Mediterranean. Supplements to the Journal for the Study of Judaism. Vol. 208. Brill. pp. 100–127. doi:10.1163/9789004540828_005. ISBN 978-9-004-54082-8.
- Daschke, Dereck (2010). City of Ruins: Mourning the Destruction of Jerusalem Through Jewish Apocalypse. Biblical Interpretation Series. Vol. 99. Brill. ISBN 978-9-004-18181-6. Archived from the original on 31 May 2024.
- deSilva, David A. (2024). Judea under Greek and Roman Rule. Oxford University Press. ISBN 978-0-190-26328-7.
- Eshel, Hanan (2003). "The Dates used during the Bar Kokhba Revolt". In Peter Schäfer (ed.). The Bar Kokhba War Reconsidered: New Perspectives on the Second Jewish Revolt Against Rome. Mohr Siebeck. pp. 95–96. ISBN 978-3-16-148076-8.
- Eshel, Hanan (2006). "The Bar Kochba Revolt, 132–135". In Katz, Steven T. (ed.). The Late Roman-Rabbinic Period. The Cambridge History of Judaism. Vol. 4th. Cambridge University Press. ISBN 978-0-521-77248-8.
- Feldman, Louis H. (1990). "Some Observations on the Name of Palestine". Hebrew Union College Annual. 61. Hebrew Union College – Jewish Institute of Religion: 1–23. JSTOR 23508170.
- Feldman, Louis H. (1996). "Some Observations on the Name of Palestine". Studies in Hellenistic Judaism. Arbeiten zur Geschichte des antiken Judentums und des Urchristentums. Vol. 30. Brill Publishers. pp. 553–576. doi:10.1163/9789004332836_024. ISBN 978-90-04-10418-1.
- Feldman, Louis (1999). "Josephus (CE 37–c. 100)". In Horbury, William; Davies, W. D.; Sturdy, John (eds.). The Early Roman Period. The Cambridge History of Judaism. Vol. 3. Cambridge University Press. pp. 901–921. ISBN 9781139053662.
- Hengel, Martin (1989). The Zealots: Investigation into the Jewish Freedom Movement in the Period from Herod until 70 AD. Translated by Smith, David (2nd (Translated from German) ed.). Edinburgh: T&T Clark. ISBN 0-567-09372-7.
- Horsley, Richard A. (2002). "Power vacuum and power struggle in 66–7 CE". In Berlin, Andrea M.; Overman, J. Andrew (eds.). The First Jewish Revolt: Archaeology, History, and Ideology. London and New York: Routledge. pp. 87–109. ISBN 978-0-415-62024-6.
- Gabba, Emilio (1999). "The social, economic and political history of Palestine 63 BCE–CE 70". In Horbury, William; Davies, W. D.; Sturdy, John (eds.). The Early Roman Period. The Cambridge History of Judaism. Vol. 3. Cambridge University Press. pp. 94–167. ISBN 9781139053662.
- Goodman, Martin (1987). The Ruling Class of Judaea: The Origins of the Jewish Revolt against Rome, A.D. 66–70. Cambridge University Press. doi:10.1017/CBO9780511552656. ISBN 9780511552656.
- Goodman, Martin (2004). "Trajan and the Origins of Roman Hostility to the Jews". Past & Present (182): 3–29. doi:10.1093/past/182.1.3. JSTOR 3600803.
- Goodman, Martin (2006). "Sadducees and Essenes after 70 CE". Judaism in the Roman World. Ancient Judaism and Early Christianity. Vol. 66. Brill. pp. 153–162. ISBN 978-9-047-41061-4.
- Goldenberg, Robert (2006). "The destruction of the Jerusalem Temple: its meaning and its consequences". In Katz, Steven T. (ed.). The Late Roman-Rabbinic Period. The Cambridge History of Judaism. Vol. 4. Cambridge University Press. pp. 194–195. doi:10.1017/chol9780521772488.009. ISBN 978-0-521-77248-8.
- Grabbe, Lester L. (2010). An Introduction to Second Temple Judaism: History And Religion Of The Jews In The Time Of Nehemiah, The Maccabees, Hillel, And Jesus. T&T Clark International. ISBN 978-0567552488.
- Grabbe, Lester L. (2021). A History of the Jews and Judaism in the Second Temple Period, Volume 4: The Jews under the Roman Shadow (4 BCE–150 CE). The Library of Second Temple Studies. T&T Clark. ISBN 978-0567700704.
- Hacham, Noah; Ilan, Tal, eds. (2022). The Early Roman Period (30 BCE–117 CE). Corpus Papyrorum Judaicarum. Vol. 5. De Gruyter Oldenbourg. doi:10.1515/9783110787764. ISBN 978-3-110-78599-9.
- Hornum, Michael B. (1993). Nemesis, the Roman State and the Games. Religions in the Graeco-Roman World. Vol. 117. Brill. ISBN 978-9-004-09745-2.
- Horbury, William (1996). "The Beginnings of the Jewish Revolt under Trajan". In Schäfer, Peter (ed.). Geschichte–Tradition–Reflexion: Festschrift für Martin Hengel zum 70 Geburstag. Vol. 1. Tübingen: Cambridge University Press.
- Horbury, William (2021). "Jewish Egypt in the Light of the Risings under Trajan". In Salvesen, Alison; Pearce, Sarah; Frenkel, Miriam (eds.). Israel in Egypt: The Land of Egypt as Concept and Reality for Jews in Antiquity and the Early Medieval Period. Ancient Judaism and Early Christianity. Vol. 110. Leiden & Boston: Brill. pp. 347–366. ISBN 978-90-04-43539-1.
- Horbury, William (2014). Jewish War under Trajan and Hadrian. Cambridge University Press. ISBN 978-1-139-04905-4.
- Isaac, Benjamin (1990). The Limits of Empire: The Roman Army in the East. Oxford University Press. ISBN 978-0-198-14952-1.
- Jacobson, David (2001), "When Palestine Meant Israel", Biblical Archaeology Review, 27 (3), archived from the original on 25 July 2011
- Kerkeslager, Allen (2006). "The Jews in Egypt and Cyrenaica, 66–c. 235 CE". In Katz, Steven T. (ed.). The Late Roman-Rabbinic Period. The Cambridge History of Judaism. Vol. 4. Cambridge University Press. ISBN 978-0-521-77248-8.
- Levine, Lee I. (2005). The Ancient Synagogue: The First Thousand Years (2nd ed.). New Haven & London: Yale University Press. ISBN 0-300-10628-9.
- Levine, David (2018). "70 CE or 135 CE – Where was the Watershed? Ancient and Modern Perspectives". In Schwartz, Joshua J.; Tomson, Peter J. (eds.). Jews and Christians in the First and Second Centuries: The Interbellum 70‒132 CE. Compendia Rerum Iudaicarum ad Novum Testamentum. Vol. 15. Brill. pp. 161–175. doi:10.1163/9789004352971_011. ISBN 978-90-04-35297-1.
- Magness, Jodi (2012). The Archaeology of the Holy Land: From the Destruction of Solomon's Temple to the Muslim Conquest. Cambridge University Press. ISBN 978-1-139-01383-3.
- Magness, Jodi (2024). Jerusalem Through The Ages: From Its Beginnings To The Crusades. New York, NY: Oxford University Press. ISBN 978-0-19-093780-5.
- Millar, Fergus (1987). "Empire, Community and Culture in the Roman near East: Greeks, Syrians, Jews and Arabs". Journal of Jewish Studies. 38 (2): 147. doi:10.18647/1337/JJS-1987.
- Pucci Ben Zeev, Miriam (2006). "The Uprisings in the Jewish Diaspora, 116–117". In Katz, Steven T. (ed.). The Late Roman-Rabbinic Period. The Cambridge History of Judaism. Vol. 4. Cambridge: Cambridge University Press. pp. 93–104. doi:10.1017/CHOL9780521772488.005. ISBN 978-0-521-77248-8.
- Schwartz, Seth (2016). "The Impact of the Jewish Rebellions, 66–135 CE: Destruction or Provincialization?". In Collins, John J.; Manning, J.G. (eds.). Revolt and Resistance in the Ancient Classical World and the Near East. Culture and History of the Ancient Near East. Vol. 85. Brill. pp. 234–252. doi:10.1163/9789004330184_016. ISBN 978-90-04-33018-4.
- Stemberger, Günter (1999). "The Sadducees – Their History and Doctrines". In Horbury, William; Davies, W. D.; Sturdy, John (eds.). The Early Roman Period. The Cambridge History of Judaism. Vol. 3. Cambridge University Press. pp. 428–443. ISBN 9781139053662.
- Mason, Steve (2016). A History of the Jewish War: AD 66–74. Key Conflicts of Classical Antiquity. Cambridge University Press. doi:10.1017/CBO9781139020718. ISBN 978-1-139-02071-8.
- McLaren, James S. (2011). "Going to War against Rome: The Motivation of the Jewish Rebels". In Popović, Mladen (ed.). The Jewish Revolt against Rome: Interdisciplinary Perspectives. Brill. pp. 129–153. doi:10.1163/9789004216693_007. ISBN 978-9-004-21668-6.
- Meyers, Eric M.; Chancey, Mark A. (2012). Alexander to Constantine: Archaeology of the Land of the Bible, Volume III. The Anchor Yale Bible Reference Library. Yale University Press. ISBN 978-0-300-14179-5. JSTOR j.ctt32brvs.
- Millar, Fergus (1995). The Roman Near East: 31 BC–AD 337. Harvard University Press. ISBN 978-0-674-77886-3.
- Price, Jonathan J. (1992). Jerusalem under Siege: The Collapse of the Jewish State, 66-70 C.E. Brill's Series in Jewish Studies. Vol. 3. Brill. ISBN 978-9-004-09471-0.
- Price, Jonathan (2011). "The Jewish Population of Jerusalem from the First Century BCE to the Early Second Century CE: The Epigraphic Record". In Popović, Mladen (ed.). The Jewish Revolt against Rome: Interdisciplinary Perspectives. Brill. pp. 399–418. doi:10.1163/9789004216693_017. ISBN 978-9-004-21668-6.
- Price, Jonathan (2024). "Historiography in the Time of Stasis: Reflections on the Nationalistic Uprisings in Judea/Palestine". In Czajkowski, Kimberley; Friedman, David A. (eds.). Looking In, Looking Out: Jews and Non-Jews in Mutual Contemplation. Supplements to the Journal for the Study of Judaism. Vol. 212. Leiden and Boston: Brill. pp. 15–37. doi:10.1163/89004685055 (inactive 1 July 2025). ISBN 978-9-004-68503-1.
- Ritter, Bradley (2015). Judeans in the Greek Cities of the Roman Empire. Supplements to the Journal for the Study of Judaism. Vol. 170. Brill. ISBN 978-9-004-28983-3.
- Rogers, Guy MacLean (2022). For the Freedom of Zion: The Great Revolt of Jews against Romans, 66–74 CE. Yale University Press. ISBN 978-0-300-24813-5.
- Rosenfeld, Ben Zion (1997). "Sage and Temple in Rabbinic Thought After the Destruction of the Second Temple". Journal for the Study of Judaism in the Persian, Hellenistic, and Roman Period. 28 (4): 437–464. doi:10.1163/157006397X00228. JSTOR 24668433.
- Safrai, Samuel; Stern, Menachem (1974). The Jewish People in the First Century. Vol. 1. Brill. ISBN 978-9-004-27500-3.
- Safrai, Samuel (1976). "The Era of the Mishnah and Talmud (70–640)". A History of the Jewish People. Cambridge, Massachusetts: Harvard University Press. pp. 307–382. ISBN 0-674-39731-2.
- Schaper, Joachim (1999). "The Pharisees". In Horbury, William; Davies, W. D.; Sturdy, John (eds.). The Early Roman Period. The Cambridge History of Judaism. Vol. 3. Cambridge University Press. pp. 402–427. ISBN 9781139053662.
- Smallwood, E. Mary (1976). The Jews under Roman Rule from Pompey to Diocletian. SBL Press. ISBN 978-90-04-50204-8.
- Stuckenbruck, Loren T.; Gurtner, Daniel M., eds. (2019). T&T Clark Encyclopedia of Second Temple Judaism. Vol. 2. T&T Clark. ISBN 978-0-567-66144-9.
- Syon, Danny (2002). "Gamla: City of refuge". In Berlin, Andrea M.; Overman, J. Andrew (eds.). The First Jewish Revolt: Archaeology, History, and Ideology. London and New York: Routledge. pp. 134–153. ISBN 978-0-415-62024-6.
- Tropper, Amram (2016). Rewriting Ancient Jewish History: The History of the Jews in Roman Times and the New Historical Method. London & New York: Routledge. ISBN 978-1-138-64148-8.
- Walker, Susan (2002). "Hadrian and the Renewal of Cyrene". Libyan Studies. 33. Society for Libyan Studies: 45–56. doi:10.1017/S0263718900005112.
- Zissu, Boaz (2018). "Interbellum Judea 70–132 ce: An Archaeological Perspective". In Schwartz, Joshua J.; Tomson, Peter J. (eds.). Jews and Christians in the First and Second Centuries: The Interbellum 70‒132 CE. Compendia Rerum Iudaicarum ad Novum Testamentum. Vol. 15. Brill. pp. 19–49. doi:10.1163/9789004352971_011. ISBN 978-90-04-35297-1.
