= Gaius Caecina Tuscus =

1st-century Roman governor of Egypt

Gaius Caecina Tuscus (Greek Gaius Kokina) was a 1st-century Roman politician and Prefect of Egypt (AD 63-66) during the reign of Nero, and is mentioned by Tacitus. Tuscus was a member of the Caecinae, an Etruscan family of Volaterrae, one of the ancient cities of Etruria.

== Named Prefect of the Praetorian Guard ==
According to Fabius Rusticus, he was named Prefect of the Praetorium in 56, in place of Burrus. But Caecina did not manage to take office, as Burrus retained control of the Praetorians through Seneca's influence.

== Prefect of Egypt ==
In 63, he was appointed governor of Egypt. There are papyrus records of Tuscus addressing concerned veteran soldiers. On the immunity of Roman legionaries, see P. Yale Inventory 1528.

On July 17, 64 AD, he is mentioned in a declaration of property in Oxyrhynchus.

=== Riots of Alexandria ===
In Alexandria, long-standing tensions between the Jews and Greek inhabitants led to riots in AD 66. Tuscus failed to control the situation. In 66, he was dismissed by the emperor when it became known that he had made use of the bathrooms that had been built for Nero's trip to Egypt before Nero had opened it. In May 66, Nero appointed Tiberius Alexander as Prefect of Egypt, one of the two most prestigious posts available to an equestrian along with Prefect of the Praetorian Guard.

== Exile ==
In 67, Caecina was exiled by Nero. However, he is known to have returned to Rome in 69.

Political offices
| Preceded by Lucius Julius Vestinus | Prefect of Egypt; 63–66 | Succeeded by Tiberius Julius Alexander |
