= Lucius Julius Vestinus =

1st century AD Roman governor of Egypt

Lucius Julius Vestinus was a member of the equestrian class who was prefect or governor of the imperial province of Egypt; his tenure ran from AD 60 to 62. He was a close friend of the emperor Claudius.

Vestinus came from Vienna (modern Vienne) in Gallia Lugdunensis, and by the reign of Claudius had been admitted into the ordo equester. Claudius mentioned Vestinus by name in a speech he delivered to the Senate in the year 48 (partly recorded in the Lyon Tablet) concerning the adlection of provincials into the Roman Senate: "From that colony comes the jewel of the equestrian order -- one of a few -- Lucius Vestinus, whom I esteem most highly and retain today in the conduct of my affairs. His children, I pray, will enjoy the first level of priestly offices and, later with the years, I pray, they will reach higher offices of their rank."

Although in his summary of Claudius' speech Tacitus omits this mention of Vestinus, the historian explicitly mentions Vestinus in his Histories: when Vespasian sought to rebuild the Temple of Jupiter Optimus Maximus on the Capitoline Hill after its destruction in the Year of Four Emperors, he assigned responsibility for the project to Vestinus, whose "high character and reputation ranked among the nobles".

He is believed to be the father of the senator Marcus Julius Vestinus Atticus.

Political offices
Preceded by Tiberius Claudius Balbilus	Prefect of Egypt; 60-62	Succeeded by Gaius Caecina Tuscus
