= Cuspius Fadus =

1st century AD Roman eques and procurator of Iudaea

Cuspius Fadus was an Ancient Roman eques and the 1st procurator of Iudaea Province in 44–46.

== History ==
After the death of King Marcus Julius Agrippa, in 44, he was appointed procurator by Claudius. During his administration, peace was restored in the country, and the only disturbance was created by one Theudas, who came forward with the claim of being a prophet. But he and his followers were put to death by the command of Cuspius Fadus, as Josephus recounts:

"It came to pass, while Cuspius Fadus was procurator of Judea, that a certain charlatan, whose name was Theudas, persuaded a great part of the people to take their effects with them, and follow him to the Jordan river; for he told them he was a prophet, and that he would, by his own command, divide the river, and afford them an easy passage over it. Many were deluded by his words. However, Fadus did not permit them to make any advantage of his wild attempt, but sent a troop of horsemen out against them. After falling upon them unexpectedly, they slew many of them, and took many of them alive. They also took Theudas alive, cut off his head, and carried it to Jerusalem."

Cuspius Fadus was succeeded as procurator in 46 by Tiberius Julius Alexander.

== See also ==
- Prefects, Procurators and Legates of Roman Judaea

== Footnotes ==
Cuspius Fadus Roman Rulers of Judea
Preceded by King Agrippa I	Procurator of Judaea; 44 to 46	Succeeded by Tiberius Julius Alexander
