= Alexandria riot (66) =

Riots in Roman Alexandria, Egypt in the year 66 CE

Alexandria riot of 66 CE
- Location: Alexandria, Roman Egypt
- Date: 66 CE
- Target: Jewish residents of Alexandria
- Attack type: Mass executions
- Deaths: 50,000+
- Perpetrator: Roman governor Tiberius Julius Alexander
- Motive: Religious and nationalistic tensions

Extensive riots erupted in Alexandria, Roman Egypt, in 66 CE, in parallel with the outbreak of the First Jewish–Roman War in neighbouring Roman Judea.

With the rising tension between the Greeks and the Jews, the Alexandrines had organized a public assembly to deliberate about an embassy to Nero, and a great number of Jews came flocking to the amphitheater. When the Alexandrines saw the Jews, they attacked them. They killed the majority of the Jews and those who were captured were burned alive. The Jews wanted retaliation for what the Greeks had done and threatened to do it with violence.

The Roman Prefect of Egypt, Gaius Caecina Tuscus, had failed to deal with the riots. In May 66, Tuscus was replaced by Tiberius Julius Alexander, himself from a Jewish family, who was able to restrain the rioters. Tiberius privately sent for the principal men of the Jews, and convinced them to be quiet, and not provoke the Roman army against them. But the seditious did not take the threat seriously and reproached him for so uttering threats. The governor now understood that those who were most riotous would not be pacified unless some great calamity would overtake them. He sent out the two Roman legions that were in the city (Legio III Cyrenaica and the Legio XXII Deiotariana), together with 5,000 other soldiers, to punish the Jews. They were permitted not only to kill them, but to plunder them of what they had, and to set fire to their houses. The Romans showed no mercy to the infants, had no regard for the aged, and went on in the slaughter of persons of every age; over 50,000 Jews lay dead in the streets. Tiberius Julius Alexander eventually took mercy on the Jews and called off the attacks.

This was but one of many riots that broke out in not only Alexandria, but also in Damascus, Caesarea and in many other places. During the events, the prefect Julius Alexander attacked the Jewish quarter of the city.

== Historic perspective ==
The tensions between the Jews and Greco-Romans in Alexandria began after the riots of 38 CE, with another violent event following in 55 CE. Later, the Jewish–Roman wars had a great impact on Alexandria, with the major Jewish community of the city engaging in extensive riots in 66 CE. A much greater violence followed 50 years later, when in 117 CE, the Jews of Alexandria participated in the great disturbances of the Diaspora Revolt, succeeding in destroying much of the Greek city before the Roman Army descended upon the city to quell the revolt.

== See also ==
- Jewish–Roman wars
- Alexandrian riots (38)
- History of the Jews in the Roman Empire
