= 2005 Alexandria riot =

Violent Egyptian riot against distribution of controversial religious play recordings

Coordinates: 31.2161°N 29.9287°E

The 2005 Alexandria riot was an anti-Christian riot in the Egyptian port city of Alexandria, resulting in several casualties. The riot was an escalation of already hightened tensions between Christians and Muslims in Egypt, especially in Alexandria, following the stabbing of a nun in the city by a Muslim man days prior and his subsequent arrest, which left the nun seriously injured.

The riot began on the 21st of October when a group of Muslims staged a demonstration outside St. George's Coptic Church. Protestors gathered in an effort to stop the alleged distribution of a DVD recording of the play "I Once Was Blind But Now I See", which tells the story of a young Coptic Christian becoming intrigued by Islam, who later is nearly killed by Islamic militants.

The situation quickly deteriorated as multiple cars were set on fire, and stones were thrown at police and the church, damaging its exterior. Unrest continued until the following day, when riot police armed with shotguns were deployed to defend the church, and prevent protestors from storming the building. Only after the use of rubber bullets, and deployment of tear gas, which killed one protestor, did the protests subdue. Over 5,000 Muslims partook in the protests. According to the Interior Ministry, over 90 people were injured, and 3 people were killed. The riot was reported on by several international news organizations.

== Aftermath ==
=== Egyptian government reaction ===
The Egyptian Government condemned the protests, labeling the protestors as "fanatic elements" who "escalated a negative reaction to a play." Following the riot, the Interior Ministry dispatched thousands of police officers across Alexandria, to prevent further unrest or risk to public safety.

Mohammed Sayyed Said, deputy director of the Al-Ahram Center for Political and Strategic Studies, attributed the violence of the protests to "rumours circulating on the Internet." Said claimed that very few people had actually watched the recording of the controversial play. Said also claimed that religious divides and tensions were being exacerbated in a "conspiracy" to "cause divisions in the country."

=== Local reaction ===
The director of the church, Father Augustinous, said that "it was difficult" to "explain the reaction to a one-time-performance that took place two years ago."

Local Muslim and Christian religious leaders expressed sadness over the violence that had taken place, and called for peaceful dialogue and conversation between people of different faiths.

A Christian man studying history at the American University in Cairo anonymously attributed the violence partly to increasing American influence in the Middle East.

A Christian candidate in Alexandria, running in that year's parliamentary elections, stepped down following the events.
