= Jacob and Simon uprising =

Revolt instigated in Roman Judea by brothers Simon and Jacob in 46–48 CE

Date	46–48
Location	Judaea Galilee
Result	Roman victory

Belligerents
Jewish Zealots	Roman Empire

Commanders and leaders
Jacob (executed); Simon (executed)	Tiberius Julius Alexander

The Jacob and Simon uprising; (Hebrew: מרד יעקב וסימון) was a revolt instigated in Roman Judea by brothers Simon and Jacob in 46–48 CE. The revolt began as a sporadic insurgency and when climaxed in 48 was quickly put down by Roman authorities, and both brothers were executed.

== Background ==
The Crisis under Caligula (37–41) has been proposed as the "first open break between Rome and the Jews", even though problems were already evident during the Census of Quirinius in 6 and under Sejanus (before 31).

Josephus' Jewish Antiquities states that there were three main Jewish sects at this time, the Pharisees, the Sadducees, and the Essenes. The so-called Zealots were a "fourth sect" - a sect curiously unnamed in Josephus, just as the zealots clearly did not refer to themselves as "zealots" -, founded by Judas of Galilee against Quirinius' tax reform, shortly after the Roman Empire declared what had most recently been the tetrarchy of Herod Archelaus to be a Roman province, and that they "agree in all other things with the Pharisaic notions; but they have an inviolable attachment to liberty, and say that God is to be their only Ruler and Lord." (18.1.6)

According to the Jewish Encyclopedia article on Zealots:

Judah of Gaulanitis is regarded as the founder of the Zealots, who are identified as the proponents of the Fourth Philosophy. In the original sources, however, no such identification is anywhere clearly made, and the question is hardly raised of the relationship between the Sicarii, the upholders of the Fourth Philosophy, and the Zealots. Josephus himself in his general survey of the various groups of freedom fighters (War 7:268–70) enumerates the Sicarii first, whereas he mentions the Zealots last.

Others have also argued that the group was not so clearly marked out (before the first war of 66-70/3) as some have thought.

== Revolt ==
Information on the revolt which erupted in Galilee, then part of the Roman Judea province, is limited. The sources however indicate that it was motivated by anti-Roman sentiments and driven by the Zealots. The uprising began as a sporadic insurgency, and climaxed in 48. Two of Judas the Galilean' sons, Jacob and Simon, were involved and were crucified by Tiberius Julius Alexander, the procurator Augusti from 46 to 48.

== See also ==
- List of conflicts in the Near East
