= Hannah Cotton =

Israeli classics professor and historian

Hannah M. Cotton-Paltiel (Hebrew: חנה מ. כותן־פלטיאל) is the Shalom Horowitz Professor of Classics in the Hebrew University of Jerusalem. She was head of its classics department until 2005. She is a classical texts researcher, and former editor of Scripta Classica Israelica. She teaches Latin language and Roman history. She is married to Ari Paltiel.

== Selected publications ==
- Cotton, Hannah M. (2022) Roman Rule and Jewish Life: Collected Papers. De Gruyter. ISBN 9783110191448 https://doi.org/10.1515/9783110770438
- Cotton, Hannah M. (1985). "Mirificum Genus Commendationis: Cicero and the Latin Letter of Recommendation". The American Journal of Philology. 106 (3): 328–334. doi:10.2307/295032. JSTOR 295032.
- Cotton, Hannah M. (1986). "A Note on the Organization of Tax-Farming in Asia Minor (Cicero, Fam., XIII, 65)". Latomus. 45 (2): 367–373. JSTOR 41538521.
- Cotton, Hannah M. (1989). "The Date of the Fall of Masada: The Evidence of the Masada Papyri". Zeitschrift für Papyrologie und Epigraphik. 78: 157–162. JSTOR 20187128.
- Cotton, Hannah (1993). "The Guardianship of Jesus Son of Babatha: Roman and Local Law in the Province of Arabia". Journal of Roman Studies. 83: 94–108. doi:10.2307/300980. JSTOR 300980.
- Cotton, Hannah M.; Cockle, W. E. H.; Millar, F. G. B. (1995). "The Papyrology of the Roman Near East: A Survey*". Journal of Roman Studies. 85: 214–235. doi:10.2307/301063. JSTOR 301063.
- Millar, Fergus; Cotton, Hannah M.; Rogers, Guy MacLean (2004). Rome, the Greek World, and the East: Government, society, and culture in the Roman Empire. University of North Carolina Press. ISBN 9780807855201.
- Cotton, Hannah M.; Hoyland, Robert G.; Price, Jonathan J.; Wasserstein, David J. (2009). From Hellenism to Islam: Cultural and Linguistic Change in the Roman Near East. Cambridge University Press. ISBN 9780521875813.
