= Tiberius Sempronius Gracchus =

Tiberius Sempronius Gracchus may refer to:

- Tiberius Sempronius Gracchus (consul 238 BC), father of Tiberius and Publius Gracchus
- Tiberius Sempronius Gracchus (consul 215 BC), son of the above
- Tiberius Sempronius Gracchus (d. 174 BC), son of the above, elected to the priesthood in 203 BC at a very young age
- Tiberius Sempronius Gracchus (consul 177 BC) (c. 217 BC–c. 150 BC), also known as Tiberius Gracchus the Elder, son of Publius Sempronius Gracchus
- Tiberius Sempronius Gracchus (c. 163 BC-133 BC), better known as Tiberius Gracchus, son of the above and tribune of the plebs
- Tiberius Sempronius Gracchus, condemned to exile c. 21 BC for being Julia the Elder's lover

== See also ==
- Sempronia gens
- Gracchi
