= Alexandrian riots (38 CE) =

Attacks directed against Jews in Roman Alexandria, Egypt in the year 38 CE

The Alexandrian riots were attacks directed against Jews in 38 CE in Roman Alexandria, Egypt.

== Statues of Caligula ==
The Roman emperor Caligula had few reasons to trust the prefect of Egypt, Aulus Avilius Flaccus. Flaccus had been loyal to Tiberius and had conspired against Agrippina the Elder, Caligula's mother. In 38 CE, Caligula sent Herod Agrippa to Alexandria unannounced. According to Philo, the visit was met with jeers from the Greek population who saw Agrippa as the king of the Jews. Flaccus tried to placate both the Greek population and Caligula by having statues of the emperor placed in Jewish synagogues, an unprecedented provocation.

== Riots at the synagogues ==
This invasion of the synagogues was perhaps resisted by force, since Philo writes that Flaccus "was destroying the synagogues, and not leaving even their name." In response, Flaccus then "issued a notice in which he called us all foreigners and aliens ... allowing any one who was inclined to proceed to exterminate the Jews as prisoners of war." Philo says that in response, the mobs "drove the Jews entirely out of four quarters [of the city], and crammed them all into a very small portion of one ... while the populace, overrunning their desolate houses, turned to plunder, and divided the booty among themselves as if they had obtained it in war." In addition, Philo says their enemies, "slew them and thousands of others with all kinds of agony and tortures, and newly invented cruelties, for wherever they met with or caught sight of a Jew, they stoned him, or beat him with sticks". Philo even says, "the most merciless of all their persecutors in some instances burnt whole families, husbands with their wives, and infant children with their parents, in the middle of the city, sparing neither age nor youth, nor the innocent helplessness of infants." Some men, he says, were dragged to death, while "those who did these things, mimicked the sufferers, like people employed in the representation of theatrical farces". Other Jews were crucified. Flaccus was eventually removed from office, exiled, and ultimately executed.

== Riots in 40 CE ==
Riots again erupted in Alexandria in 40 CE between Jews and Greeks. Jews were accused of not honouring the emperor. Disputes occurred in the city of Jamnia. Jews were angered by the erection of a clay altar and destroyed it. In response, Caligula ordered the erection of a statue of himself in the Jewish Temple of Jerusalem, a demand in conflict with Jewish monotheism. In this context, Philo wrote that Caligula "regarded the Jews with most especial suspicion, as if they were the only persons who cherished wishes opposed to his".

== Eyewitness account ==
The sole source is Philo of Alexandria, himself a Jew, who witnessed the riots and afterwards led the Jewish delegation to Caligula, and requested the re-establishment of legal Jewish residence in Alexandria. Philo's writings on the topic are found in two sources: In Flaccum (meaning "Against Flaccus"), which is wholly devoted to the riots, and Legatio ad Gaium (meaning "Embassy to Caligula"), which makes some references to the event in its introduction. Scholarly research around the subject has been divided on certain points, including whether the Alexandrian Jews fought to keep their citizenship or to acquire it, whether they evaded the payment of the poll-tax or prevented any attempts to impose it on them, and whether they were safeguarding their identity against the Greeks or against the Egyptians.

== Terminology ==
Sandra Gambetti states that "[s]cholars have frequently labeled the Alexandrian events of 38 CE as the first pogrom in history, and have often explained them in terms of an ante litteram explosion of anti-Semitism." In her book The Alexandrian Riots of 38 CE and the Persecution of the Jews (2009), however, Gambetti "deliberately avoids any words or expressions that in any way connect, explicitly or implicitly, the Alexandrian events of 38 CE to later events in modern... Jewish experience" as – in her view – this would "require a comparative re-discussion of two historical frames".

Adalbert Polacek referred to the event as a holocaust in his work Holocaust, Two Millennia Ago, a characterization that Miriam Pucci Ben Zeev believes is "misleading and methodologically unsound."

== See also ==
- Alexandria riot (66)
- Jewish–Roman wars
- History of the Jews in Egypt
- History of the Jews in the Roman Empire
- List of conflicts in the Near East
