= Tiberius Claudius Nero =

Tiberius Claudius Nero may refer to:

- Tiberius Claudius Nero (son of Caecus)
- Tiberius Claudius Nero (consul 202 BC)
- Tiberius Claudius Nero (grandfather of Tiberius Caesar)
- Tiberius Claudius Nero (father of Tiberius Caesar)
- Tiberius, formerly Tiberius Claudius Nero, Roman emperor from 14 to 37
- Claudius, formerly Tiberius Claudius Nero Germanicus, Roman emperor from 41 to 54

== See also ==
- Claudii Nerones
