= Tiberius Julius Alexander =

1st century AD Roman governor and general

Procurator of Judaea
- In office AD 46 – AD 48
- Preceded by: Cuspius Fadus
- Succeeded by: Ventidius Cumanus

Governor of Roman Egypt
- In office AD 66 – AD 69
- Preceded by: Gaius Caecina Tuscus
- Succeeded by: Lucius Peducaeus Colo(nus?)

Military service
- Allegiance: Roman Empire
- Years of service: before 46 – 70
- Rank: Praetorian prefect
- Battles/wars: Roman–Parthian War of 58–63; Battle of Delta; Alexandria (c. 68); Siege of Jerusalem (AD 70)

Tiberius Julius Alexander (fl. 1st century) was an Egyptian equestrian governor and general in the Roman Empire. Born into a wealthy Egyptian Jewish family of Alexandria but abandoning or neglecting the Jewish religion, he rose to become the 2nd procurator of Judea (c. 46 – 48) under Claudius. While Prefect of Egypt (66–69), he employed his legions against the Alexandrian Jews in a brutal response to ethnic violence, and was instrumental in the Emperor Vespasian's rise to power. In 70, he participated in the Siege of Jerusalem as Titus' second-in-command. He became the most powerful Jew of his age, and is ranked as one of the most prominent Jews in military history.

== Early life ==
Tiberius Julius Alexander was probably born early in the reign of the Emperor Tiberius (14–37). His father was Alexander, an Alexandrian Jew who held the office of Alabarch as head of customs on the Arabian frontier, but it may have denoted a senior customs official. The family of the older Alexander, a member of the Egyptian gentry, had Roman citizenship, something not infrequent among the wealthy Jews of Alexandria. He also had business connections both with Agrippa, grandson of Herod the Great, and with Antonia, mother of the emperor Claudius. Another prominent member of Tiberius Alexander's family was his uncle, the philosopher Philo.

With both Tiberius and his younger brother Marcus Julius Alexander, the father preferred to give them a grounding in classical languages, rather than have them receive a traditional Jewish education, and both had been groomed to enter into the Roman bureaucracy. Marcus Julius Alexander was the first husband of Herodian Princess Berenice. Marcus died in 43 or 44, leaving no children. The Jewish historian Josephus introduces his portrait of Tiberius by condemning him for impiety, explaining that he "did not remain in his ancestral customs". This has traditionally been taken to mean that he became an apostate from Judaism at an early age, a view which finds some support in his appearance as a character in two of Philo's philosophical dialogues, making arguments against divine providence which Philo attempts to refute. However, some more recent scholars believe that Josephus is criticizing Alexander simply for his decision to take up the service of Rome, placing the interests of the Empire above the Jewish religion.

He nevertheless continued to benefit from his family's connections, which were enhanced after the Emperor Claudius came to power in 41. Agrippa had helped to secure Claudius' accession after the assassination of Caligula, and was appointed king of Judea. Tiberius' father, who had been imprisoned by Caligula, was released on Claudius' orders, and it was at this time that his younger brother Marcus became Berenice's husband. Tiberius's first senior appointment was as governor of the Thebaid in 42 CE.

== Career until 63 ==
Tiberius Alexander was evidently well enough connected for an equestrian career in Roman public life. The first position he is known to have held, beginning in about 42, was that of epistrategus of the Thebaid, one of the three regions into which the Roman province of Egypt was divided. This was an administrative and judicial post involving no military command. He may have perhaps maintained contacts with his brother Marcus, who was trading in the same area until his premature death in 43 or 44.

In recognition of his administrative abilities in the Thebaid after four years of service there, Claudius appointed him procurator of Judea in 46 CE. The province had returned to direct Roman rule only after the death of Agrippa in 44, and from the tenure of Alexander's predecessor Cuspius Fadus it had been a hotbed of zealot nationalism. Despite the opinion of some fellow Jews that he was a turncoat, his period of office as Procurator in Judea was marked by peace, as Josephus himself writes. He did condemn James and Simon, sons of an earlier rebel named Judas of Galilee, to crucifixion. It was also at this time that Judea was afflicted by a severe famine. In 48 he was succeeded by Ventidius Cumanus.

Alexander appears to have risen in the ranks – though the details are unknown, until, with the reign of Nero, he served as a staff officer under the prominent general Gnaeus Domitius Corbulo during campaigns against Parthia, under whom he distinguished himself. In 63 he was dispatched along with Corbulo's son-in-law to escort the Armenian king Tiridates, with whom he himself had initiated negotiations, to the Roman camp, on the first stage of his journey to receive the status of client king from Nero.

== Prefecture of Egypt ==
In May 66, after Corbulo had backed him, Nero appointed Alexander Prefect of Egypt, one of the two most prestigious posts available to an equestrian along with Prefect of the Praetorian Guard. Alexander may have benefitted from a philhellenic tendency in equestrian appointments under Nero, but his experience of Egypt must also have commended him. The year he assumed office saw the outbreak of the First Jewish–Roman War in Judea, and aggression inevitably spilled over into the large Jewish community of Alexandria. An outbreak of ethnic violence during a Greek assembly escalated when the Greeks took prisoners, leading the Jewish side to threaten to burn the assembled Greeks to death. Alexander sent mediators to calm the Jews, warning he would have to use the Roman legions if violence continued. The threat was ineffective, and Josephus describes the outcome:

[Alexander] then let loose among them the two Roman legions, and with them 2,000 soldiers who happened to have come from Libya, with fearful consequences for the Jews. He gave the men leave not merely to kill them but also to plunder their property and burn down their houses. The soldiers rushed into the area called Delta where the Jews were concentrated, and proceeded to carry out their orders, but not without bloodshed on their own side; for the Jews stood shoulder to shoulder with their most heavily armed men in front and held their ground magnificently, but when once the line gave they were destroyed wholesale. Death came upon them in every form; some were overtaken in the open, others driven into their houses, which the Romans first looted and then burnt down. They felt no pity for infants, no respect for the aged; old and young were slaughtered right and left, so that the whole district was deluged with blood and 50,000 corpses were heaped up: even the remnant would not have survived had they not begged for mercy till Alexander, pitying them, ordered the Romans to retire.

A less violent side to Alexander's government is demonstrated by other evidence. Over a century after his time, his administrative decisions were still being cited as precedents. Some of these are known from a surviving edict issued on 6 July 68, less than a month after Nero's death. This denounces, and introduces measures against, a variety of abuses including inaccurate tax assessments, malicious prosecutions and the imprisonment of debtors by private creditors. The edict's only allusion to the chaotic political situation comes as a call for trust in the benevolence of the new Emperor, Galba, and his ability to put right the wrongs of the past. Alexander was making representations to Galba on behalf of the provincials, presumably representing the desired reforms as the price of loyalty from this vital grain-producing province.

Neither Galba nor his successor Otho survived long in office. In April 69, Vitellius was recognized as Emperor by the Roman Senate, but his opponents were beginning to rally behind Vespasian, commander of the Roman forces conducting the war in Judea. The loyalties of Alexander, who commanded two legions and had control of the grain shipments from Alexandria to Rome, were of crucial importance. Fortunately for Vespasian, Alexander was willing to correspond with him secretly; go-betweens suspected by modern historians include Berenice (soon to be lover of Vespasian's son Titus), and an Egyptian official named Basilides. On 1 July Alexander became the first to make a decisive move against Vitellius: on receipt of a letter from Vespasian, he instructed his forces to take the oath of allegiance to Vespasian as Emperor. His lead was followed by legions throughout the eastern Empire, and the anniversary of Vespasian's accession was later celebrated on this date.

== Siege of Jerusalem ==
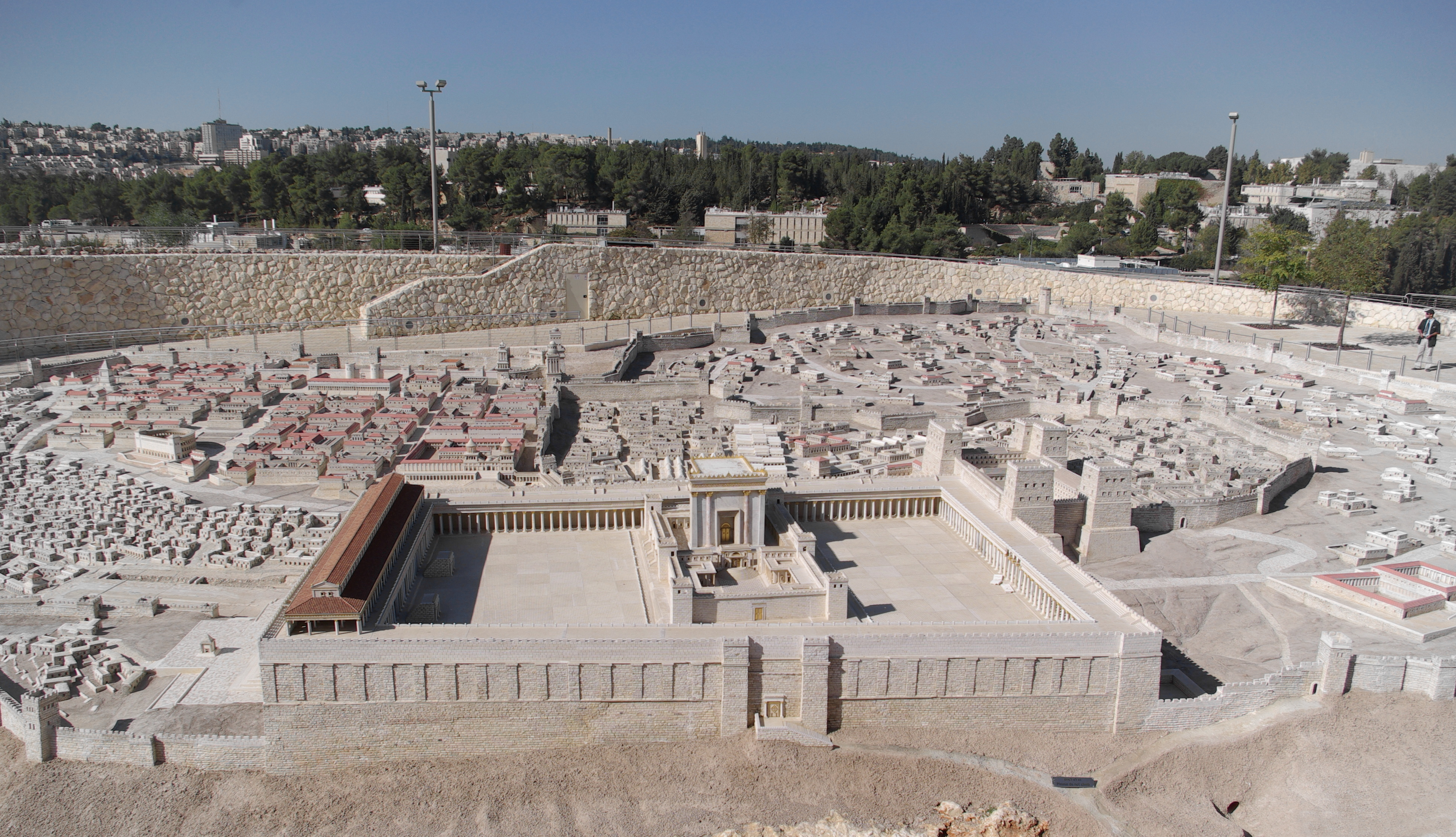
Model of Herod's Temple, currently in the Israel Museum.

Vespasian moved rapidly to Egypt, leaving the Jewish war under the command of Titus. At the same time Alexander, as a proven commander with experience of Jewish affairs, was sent by Vespasian to join Titus as his chief of staff and adviser, second only to Titus himself. The siege of Jerusalem was conducted by four legions, and even after the city walls were overcome, the defenders held out in the Temple. Alexander participated in an initial decision not to destroy the Temple, which would remain an ornament, but to quench the fire. Two subsequent assaults by Jewish forces were repelled, and the survivors retreated to the inner temple. In a sortie, according to Josephus they clashed with the Roman troops tasked with putting the flames out, and one enraged Roman soldier threw a brand into the sanctum, destroying it. Josephus's accounts of the sequence of events, and of who was responsible, is highly contradictory, though, as in rabbinic tradition, both this and the earlier destruction of the Temple were due to God's will, Nebuchadnezzer and the Romans being but his instruments.

== Later career ==
By this time, Vespasian's position in Rome was secure. The details of Alexander's career under the new emperor remain unclear. A damaged papyrus refers to Alexander as holding the position of "Praetorian Prefect", which is open to two interpretations. It could indicate his rank during Titus' campaign in 70, which would mean that he held his own independent imperium (commanding authority). According to another view, it means that he became Prefect of the Praetorian Guard at Rome, which in later years became a common position for former Prefects of Egypt. In either case, Alexander attained a position in the Roman Empire that was unparalleled for a man of Jewish birth, not to mention one who suffered from the further stigma of an Egyptian origin. The xenophobic speaker of Juvenal's first Satire, composed in the late 1st or early in the 2nd century AD, complains of passing the Forum's triumphal statues, "where some Egyptian Arabarch's had the nerve to set up his titles. At his image it's right to do more than piss!" This is very likely a reference to Alexander.

== See also ==
- Prefects, Procurators, and Legates of Roman Judaea

== Notes ==
Political offices
Preceded by Cuspius Fadus	Procurator of Judea c. 46–48	Succeeded by Ventidius Cumanus
Preceded by Gaius Caecina Tuscus	Prefect of Egypt; 66–69	Succeeded by Lucius Peducaeus Colo(nus?)
