= Jewish revolt against Heraclius =

Jewish rebellion during Byzantine–Sasanian War of 602–628

- Part of the Byzantine–Sasanian War of 602–628
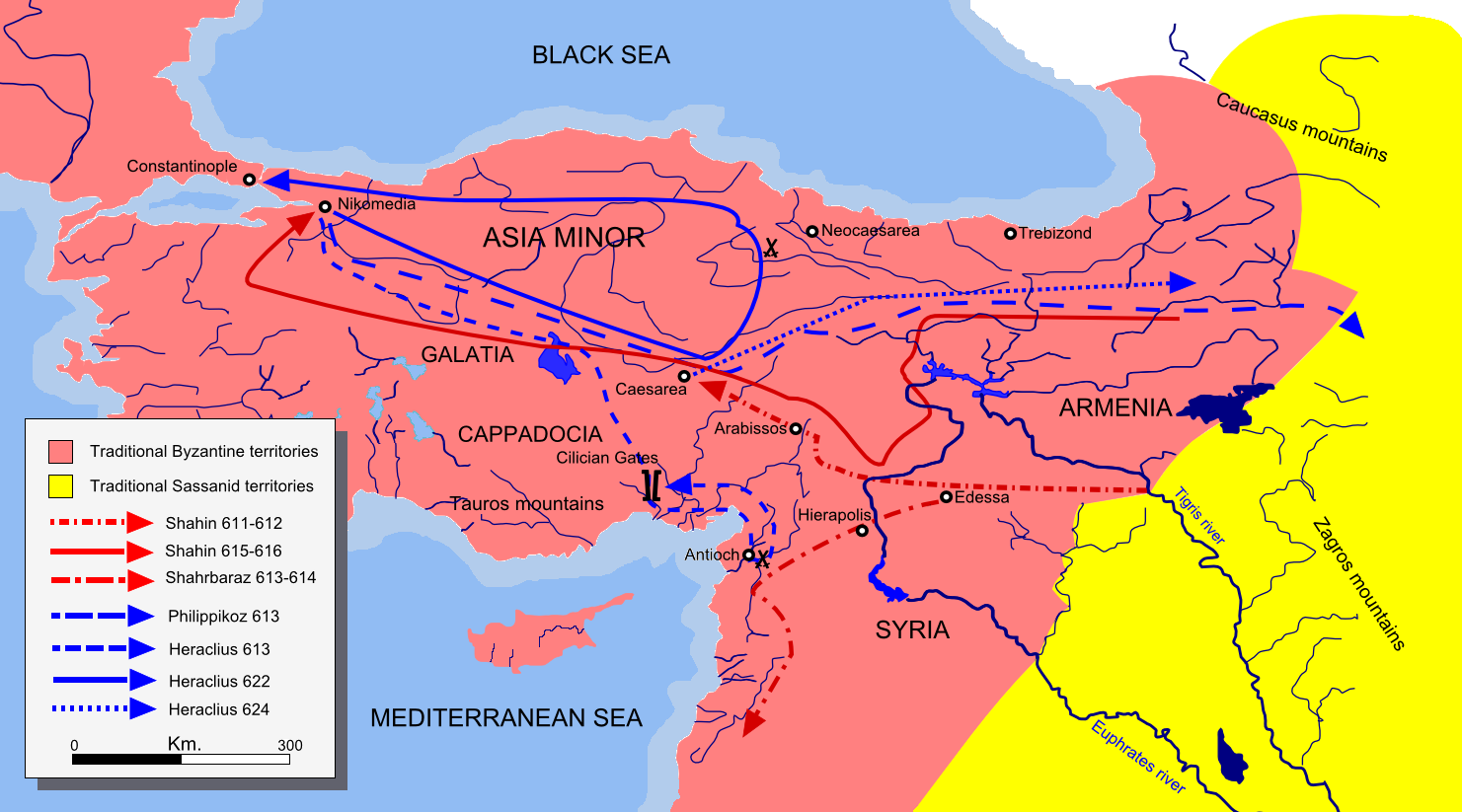
Date	614–617/625 CE
Location	Palaestina Prima of the Diocese of the East
Result	Byzantine victory

Belligerents
Byzantine Empire	Sasanian Empire; Jewish allies

Commanders and leaders
Heraclius; Zacharias of Jerusalem (POW); Modestus of Jerusalem (in 617)	Shahrbaraz; Nehemiah ben Hushiel (executed); Benjamin of Tiberias

Units involved
Byzantine army	Sasanian army

Strength
Unknown	20,000 or 26,000 Jewish rebels

Casualties and losses
- 4,518–24,518+ Christians killed around Jerusalem

Jews revolted against Emperor Heraclius during the Byzantine–Sasanian War of 602–628. It was the last time Jews had autonomy over Jerusalem prior to modern times. Taking advantage of the weakening Byzantine control in the eastern provinces, Jewish communities in Palestine allied with the invading Persian forces against Byzantine rule, which had long imposed religious and legal restrictions on them. When the Persians captured Jerusalem in 614, Jewish rebels briefly gained influence in the city, ruling in some capacity until 617. At this point, the Persians reversed course, siding with the local Christians. When Heraclius later defeated the Persians and reconquered the region in the late 620s, Byzantine authority was re-established, and severe reprisals followed. These included massacres, forced conversions, and expulsions of Jews, ultimately ending the revolt.

== Background ==
Jews and Samaritans were persecuted frequently by the Byzantines resulting in numerous revolts. Byzantine religious propaganda developed strong anti-Jewish elements. In several cases, Jews tried to help support the Sasanian advance. A pogrom in Antioch in 608 would lead to a Jewish revolt in 610, which was crushed. Jews also revolted in both Tyre and Acre in 610. The Jews of Tyre were massacred in reprisal. Unlike in earlier times, when Jews had supported Christians in the fight against Shapur I, the Byzantines had now become viewed as oppressors.

The territory had a substantial indigenous Jewish population at this time. James Parkes estimates that if ten percent of the Jewish population joined the revolt and the figure of 20,000 rebels is correct then 200,000 Jews were living in the territory at the time. Likewise, Michael Avi-Yonah used the figure of Jewish combatants to arrive at an estimate of the total Jewish population. He gives a figure of 150,000 to 200,000 living in 43 Jewish settlements. Salo Wittmayer Baron in 1957 questioned the reliability of the number of Jewish combatants recorded in ancient texts and the population estimates based on these texts, although he does not discount the estimate altogether. He reasons that the 43 Jewish settlements Avi-Yonah lists may indeed be supportive of a minority Jewish presence of 10 to 15%. Jacob Neusner similarly accepts this estimate. In 1950, Israel Cohen gave an estimate of double these values, estimating that between 300,000 and 400,000 Jews were in the land. More recently, Moshe Gil has postulated that the combined Jewish and Samaritan population was a majority in the early 7th century.

Jews were concentrated in the Galilee during this time period. The Galilee contained several cities which are thought to have been populated largely by a homogenous Jewish demographic, Tiberias being a center of Jewish learning. In fact, the title of the Jerusalem Talmud is something of a misnomer, as it was actually compiled in Tiberias, as Jews were banned from Jerusalem.

== Timeline ==
=== Galilee and Caesarea ===
Following the Battle of Antioch in 613, Shahrbaraz led his forces through Palaestina Secunda and into Palaestina Prima provinces. Shahrbaraz conquered Caesarea Maritima, the administrative capital of the Palaestina Prima province. When Shahrbaraz had entered Galilee, a significant Jewish revolt took place with some 20,000 Jewish rebels joining him in the war against the Byzantines. Depending on the chronicler, figures of either 20,000 or 26,000 are given.

The Sasanian Persians were joined by Nehemiah ben Hushiel and Benjamin of Tiberias (a man of immense wealth), who enlisted and armed Jewish soldiers from Tiberias, Nazareth and the mountain cities of Galilee, and together with a band of Arabs and additional Jews from southern parts of the country, they marched on Jerusalem.

=== Capture of Jerusalem ===
The Persian army reinforced by Jewish forces led by Nehemiah ben Hushiel and Benjamin of Tiberias would capture Jerusalem without resistance.

The capture of Jerusalem was interpreted by Jewish writers in a messianic context. Sacrifices may even have been renewed on the Temple Mount. Control of the city was handed to Nehemiah ben Hushiel and Benjamin of Tiberias. Nehemiah was then appointed the ruler of Jerusalem. He began making arrangements for the building of the Third Temple and sorting out genealogies to establish a new High Priesthood.

=== Christian rebellion ===
Shortly after Jerusalem was handed over to Jewish forces led by Nehemiah ben Hushiel, expulsions of the local Christian population took place, causing a revolt. Nehemiah ben Hushiel and his council of sixteen righteous were killed along with many other Jews, some throwing themselves off the city walls. The surviving Jews fled to Shahrbaraz's encampment at Caesarea, and Christians forces were able to briefly retake Jerusalem. A short siege between 19 and 21 days by Shahrbaraz's forces breached the walls and allowed the Persians to retake the city.

According to the Armenian bishop and historian Sebeos, the siege resulted in a total Christian death toll of 17,000, with a large number of prisoners. 4,518, according to Georgian translations of Sebeos and 24,518 according to Arabic translations, were massacred near Mamilla reservoir per Antiochus Strategos. James Howard-Johnston argues that the massacre occurred in the context of the returning Jews attempting to round up the ring leaders who had led the earlier pogrom. Theophanes the Confessor cited a death toll as high as 90,000. However, most historians reject this as unreliable. In addition, 35,000 or 37,000 people, including the Patriarch of Jerusalem Zacharias, were deported to Mesopotamia. Contemporary accounts state the city suffered extensive damage, although widespread destruction of Jerusalem during the siege or immediately after has not been found in the archaeological record. The search for the True Cross is said to have involved the torture of clergymen. Once found, the True Cross was carried off to Ctesiphon.

Strategos, himself taken into Persian captivity afterwards, wrote that the Jews offered to help the Christian captives escape death if they "become Jews and deny Christ." Those who refused conversion were purchased by the Jews and killed. A significant number of burial sites were allocated according to Antiochus. A mass burial grave at Mamilla cave was discovered in 1989 by Israeli archeologist Ronny Reich near the site where Antiochus recorded the massacre took place. The human remains were in poor condition, allowing the identification of only 526 individuals out of thousands of suspected victims.

=== Jewish expedition to Tyre ===
According to Eutychius (887–940), the Jews launched an expedition against Tyre. Bands of Jews from Jerusalem, Tiberias, Galilee, Damascus, and even from Cyprus, united and undertook an incursion against Tyre, having been invited by the 4,000 Jewish inhabitants of that city to surprise and massacre the Christians on Easter night. The Jewish army is said to have consisted of 20,000 men. The expedition, however, miscarried, as the Christians of Tyre learned of the impending danger and seized the 4,000 Tyrian Jews as hostages. The Jewish invaders destroyed the churches around Tyre, an act which the Christians avenged by killing two thousand of their Jewish prisoners. The besiegers, to save the remaining prisoners, withdrew, having had to suffer the humiliation of watching the heads of the Jewish captives as they were thrown over the walls.

=== Jewish control of Jerusalem ===
The Jews had hoped that Khosrow II would give them all of the Land of Israel in exchange for their support. However, they were too few to make this a reality. From 614 to 617 CE, they enjoyed control of Jerusalem, although it may have been in a state of relative anarchy for some of this period. By 617 CE, the Persians had reversed their policy and sided with the Christians over the Jews, probably because of pressure from Mesopotamian Christians in Persia itself. Further Jewish settlers were banned from settling in or around Jerusalem and a small synagogue on the Temple Mount was also demolished. Instead of supporting the Jews, Khosrow is said to have imposed heavy taxes on them.

=== Byzantine return to Jerusalem ===
By 622 CE, the Byzantine Emperor Heraclius had assembled an army to retake the territory lost to the Sasanian Empire. In 628, following the deposition of Khosrow II, Kavad II made peace with Heraclius, but Kavad II would only have a brief reign. The conquered city and the Cross would remain in Sasanian hands until they were returned by Shahrbaraz. On 21 March 630, Heraclius marched in triumph into Jerusalem with the True Cross. Ancient manuscripts date Heraclius' entry into Jerusalem as 21 March 629. Modern scholars increasingly doubt this date for a number of reasons.

==== Dating Byzantine return ====
Walter Emil Kaegi puts the death of Kavad II in September 629. The Persian succession between 628 and 632 becomes confused and different historians give different succession timelines. In the period following the death of Kavad II, up to six different individual are said to have reigned, these are Ardashir III, Shahrbaraz, Borandukht, Shapur-i Shahrvaraz, Azarmidokht and Farrukh Hormizd. Negotiations continued with Shahrbaraz being the real power. Antiochus records that Heraclius made an agreement with Ardashir III with Shahrbaraz acting as intermediary, Nikephoros gives a date of July 629 at Arabissos. Walter Emil Kaegi sees this July 629 meeting as representing an earlier negotiation with Shahrbaraz preceding the death of Kavad II. Nikephoros exaggerated and confused the record by claiming that Hormizd succeeded Kavad II. Claiming Hormizd sent his son to Heraclius' court.

Heraclius was in Constantinople in 629 where he issued a "novel", or law, that went into effect on 1 April 629. At Arabissos Heraclius and Shahrbaraz would agree on new borders. To seal the deal Shahrbaraz's son Niketas and another of his brothers came to live at the Byzantine court, having been held for a time in central Mesopotamia practically as hostages. They arrived along with the True Cross. The Holy Sponge was attached to the cross in a special ceremony in Constantinople on 14 September 629. The Holy Lance followed reaching Constantinople on 28 October 629. It is probable that at this time, Niketas converted to Christianity; as he was his father's heir-apparent, this opened the prospect of the Christianization of Persia should Shahrbaraz be able to maintain his power there.

Heraclius would not have entered Jerusalem while the Persian troop presence persisted. Heraclius brother Theodore had encounter resistance at Edessa and Heraclius would not have exposed himself to similar danger. Shahrbaraz had Ardashir III assassinated and took control of the Persian Empire from 27 April 630 to 9 June 630. The 630 date would also have the advantage of matching the date for the Fast of Heraclius.

=== Discourse ===
==== Reconciliation attempts ====
Heraclius came as victor into the country, and the Jews of Tiberias and Nazareth, under the leadership of Benjamin of Tiberias, surrendered and asked for his protection. It is said that Benjamin even accompanied Heraclius on his voyage to Jerusalem and was persuaded to convert, obtaining a general pardon for himself and the Jews. He was baptized in Nablus in the house of Eustathios, an influential Christian. However, once Heraclius reached Jerusalem, he broke his promise to Benjamin of Tiberias after seeing the mass graves at the Mamilla Reservoir. Some modern scholars ascribe the story of the "Oath of Heraclius" to the realm of legend, doubting that Heraclius ever made such a promise, or else view his alleged reluctance to break the oath as a product of later apologists.

==== Massacre of the Jews ====
Jews were expelled from Jerusalem and were not allowed to settle within a three-mile radius. A general massacre of the Jewish population ensued. The massacre devastated the Jewish communities of the Galilee and Jerusalem. Only those Jews who could flee to the mountains or Egypt are said to have been spared.

In atonement for the violation of the emperor's oath to the Jews, the monks are said to have pledged themselves to a yearly fast, which is still observed by the Copts, called the Fast of Heraclius.

==== Conversion policy of Heraclius ====
In 628, Heraclius reportedly rescinded a decision made by his brother that would have exterminated the Jews of Edessa for supporting the Persians. Robert Bonfil suggests that Heraclius’ change of heart in 630 cannot be separated from the "Jewish Question" and the anti-Jewish world view ubiquitous to Christian thought at that time. He sees the decision as being based more on politics than religion. Heraclius is one of the few Byzantine emperors to have had an imperial conversion campaign. The rarity of such campaigns is thought to be due to Christian theological constraints. In Christian apocalyptic literature, some Jews must remain until the end of time. Christian theologians of the time also had other core theological reasons for rejecting the forced conversion of Jews.

In another legend, Heraclius' astrologers are said to have revealed to him that a circumcised people would conquer his empire. Heraclius set out to forcibly convert the Jews of the Byzantine Empire, reportedly advising his friend Dagobert, king of the Franks, to do likewise.

== Aftermath ==
After the successful Sasanian siege of Jerusalem, Jews were given autonomy under Nehemiah Ben Hushiel and Benjamin of Tiberias. Yet this period of Jewish autonomy in Jerusalem only lasted from 614 to 617, as the Persians did not go through with the plans of building a Third Temple, and, soon after, Heraclius re-conquered Jerusalem. Following the defeat of the Persian Empire, the territory would not remain in Byzantine hands for long, and by 638, the Arabs had conquered Jerusalem. Caesarea would remain under Byzantine control until 640. The Arab Islamic Empire under Caliph Umar conquered the lands of Mesopotamia, the Levant, and Egypt.

== Demographic impact ==
Some historians believe the war reduced and weakened the Christian population not just in Jerusalem but across the Near East, allowing the success of the following Arab invasion. Archaeological work within the Old City of Jerusalem has partially confirmed contemporary accounts of widespread killing of Jerusalem's Christian inhabitants with the numerous mass graves being dated to the early 7th century. However, neither widespread burning nor destruction of churches have been found in the archaeological record. Despite the claims of large scale destruction, the archaeological evidence does not reveal layers of destruction associated with the Persian conquest. There was also no hard evidence found for the widespread destruction of churches.

A significant number of burial sites were allocated according to Strategius. A mass burial grave at Mamilla cave was discovered in 1989 by Israeli archeologist Ronny Reich, near the site where Strategius recorded the massacre took place. The human remains were in such poor condition that only 526 individuals could be identified out of the thousands suspected to be buried there.

Demographic continuity might have resulted from population exchange by the victorious Jewish rebels, but apparently also the Christian habitation remained relatively constant, despite the disturbance by the Persian conquest, and no significant impact on the population of Jerusalem was made during the following period of Sassanid dominance.

== In apocalyptic literature ==
The events of the Persian–Byzantine struggle in the Levant and the consequent Arab conquest inspired several apocalyptic Jewish writings of the early Middle Ages. Helping to popularize the idea of a war messiah, the Messiah ben Joseph, who would die paving the way for the Messiah ben David. Among these are the Apocalypse of Zerubbabel, which is partially attributed to the events between the Persian conquest of Palaestina and subsequent Muslim conquest of Syria.

The Tiburtine Sibyl records that the Jews of the Byzantine Empire would be converted in one hundred and twenty years, seeming to refer to these occurrences, since about one hundred and twenty years elapsed from the time of the Persian war under Anastasius in 505, to the victory of Heraclius in 628. Some scholars see similarities between these Christian works and their Jewish counterparts.

== See also ==
=== Jewish and Samaritan revolts ===
- History of the Jews in the Roman Empire
- Jewish–Roman wars
  - First Jewish–Roman War, 66–73 CE
  - Kitos War, 115–117 CE
  - Diaspora revolt, 115–117 CE
  - Bar Kokhba revolt, 132–136 CE
- Jewish revolt against Constantius Gallus, 352 CE
- Samaritan revolts, 484–572 CE

=== Related topics ===
- List of conflicts in the Near East
- History of the Jews in the Roman Empire
- Yehud Medinata
