= Palaestina =

Palaestina or Palaestinae may refer to:

- Syria Palaestina, a province of the Roman Empire (AD 135–390) following the merger of Judaea with Syria

- Palaestina Prima, a province of the Roman Empire (390–c. 636) comprising Galilee and the northern Jordan Valley
- Palaestina Secunda, a province of the Roman Empire (390–c. 636) comprising the shoreline and hills of the southern Levant
- Palaestina Salutaris, alias Palestina Tertia, a province of the Roman Empire (300–c. 636), comprising the Negev and large parts of the Sinai and Transjordan

- Palaestina (spider), a genus of ant spiders
- Daboia palaestinae, viper species endemic to the Levant
- Leucania palaestinae, a species of moth
- Caesarea Palaestinae, an ancient and medieval port city
- Corpus Inscriptionum Iudaeae/Palaestinae, book on historic Palestine

== See also ==
- Palestina (disambiguation)
- Palestine (disambiguation)
- Palaestinus
