= Benjamin of Tiberias =

Leading figure of the Jewish revolt against the Byzantine emperor Heraclius

Benjamin of Tiberias was a man of immense wealth, who enlisted and armed many soldiers during the Jewish revolt against Heraclius in the 7th century Palaestina province of the Byzantine Empire. The Persian force was joined by Benjamin of Tiberias, who enlisted and armed Jewish soldiers from Tiberias, Nazareth and the mountain cities of Galilee. Together they marched on Jerusalem. Later, they were joined by the Jews of the southern parts of the country; and supported by a band of Arabs, the united forces took Jerusalem in 614 CE. Benjamin was one of the leaders of the revolt, actively participating in the Persian siege and capture of Jerusalem in 614. It is thought that the second leader Nehemiah ben Hushiel was appointed as ruler of Jerusalem.

== Final years ==
In 628 following the reign of Khosrow II, Kavadh II made peace with Heraclius giving Palaestina Prima and the True Cross back to the Byzantines. The conquered city and the Holy Cross would remain in Sasanian hands until they were returned by Shahrbaraz. Shahrbaraz and his son Niketas, who converted to Christianity, would control Jerusalem until at least the late summer/early autumn of 629. On March 21 630 Heraclius marched in triumph into Jerusalem with the True Cross. Heraclius came as victor into the Land of Israel and the Jews of Tiberias and Nazareth, under the leadership of Benjamin of Tiberias, surrendered and asked for his protection. It is said that Benjamin even accompanied Heraclius on his voyage to Jerusalem and Benjamin was persuaded to convert, Benjamin obtained a general pardon for himself and the Jews. He was baptized in Nablus in the house of Eustathios, an influential Christian. However, once Heraclius reached Jerusalem and saw the mass graves of massacred Christians at the Mamilla Reservoir, he was persuaded to go back on his promise to Benjamin of Tiberias. Jews were expelled from Jerusalem and were not allowed to settle within a three-mile radius. A general massacre of the Jewish population ensued. The massacre devastated the Jewish communities of Galilee and Jerusalem. According to Eutychius (887-940), the Christians population and monks of Jerusalem convinced the Emperor to break his word. Some modern scholars ascribe the story of the "Oath of Heraclius" to the realm of legend doubting that Heraclius ever made such a promise, instead ascribing this as a product of later apologists. In atonement for the violation of the emperor's oath to the Jews, the monks are said to have pledged themselves to a yearly fast, which is still observed by the Copts, called the Fast of Heraclius. The fate of Benjamin is not known for certain.
