= Palaestina Secunda =

Byzantine province (390-636)

Provincia Palaestina Secunda Ἐπαρχία Παλαιστίνη Δευτέρα
- Province of the Diocese of the East, Byzantine Empire
- 390–636
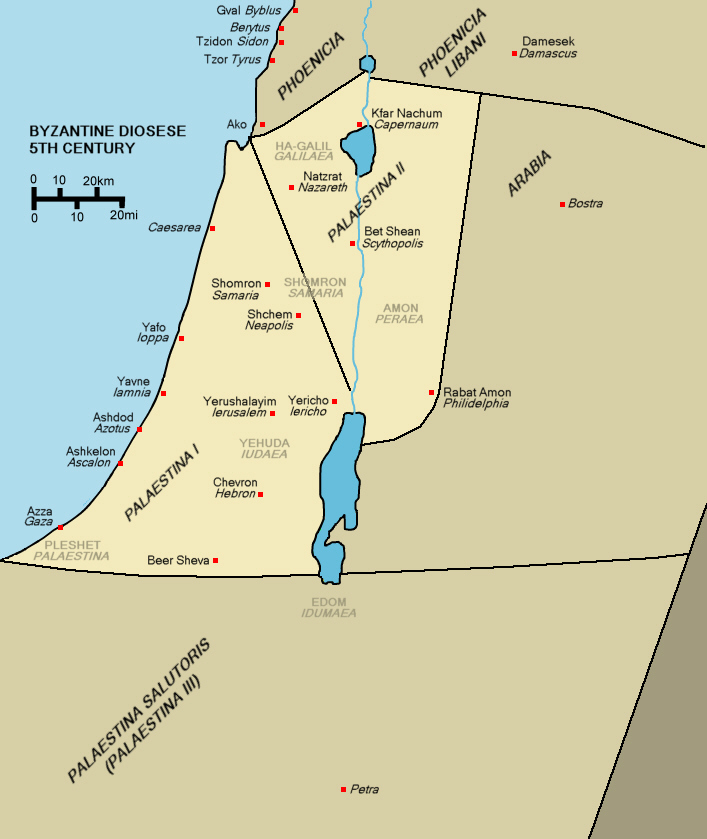
- Byzantine Palestine in the 5th century
- Capital: Scythopolis
- Historical era: Byzantine Palestine
  - division of the Roman Empire: 390
  - Jewish revolt and Persian occupation: 614–625
  - Muslim conquest of Syria: 636
Preceded by	Succeeded by
Syria Palaestina	Jund al-Urdunn
- Today part of: Israel; Jordan; Palestine; Syria

Palaestina Secunda or Palaestina II was a province of the Byzantine Empire from 390, until its conquest by the Muslim armies in 634–636. Palaestina Secunda, a part of the Diocese of the East, roughly comprised inland Galilee, the Jezreel (Yizrael) Valley, Bet Shean Valley, and the corresponding area of Transjordan (parts of the former Decapolis, with the southern territories of the Golan plateau and the bishopric of Pella south of the Yarmuk River), with its capital in Scythopolis (Bet Shean). The province experienced the rise of Christianity under the Byzantines, but was also a thriving center of Judaism, after the Jews had been driven out of Judea by the Romans as a result of their 1st- and 2nd-century revolts.

== History ==
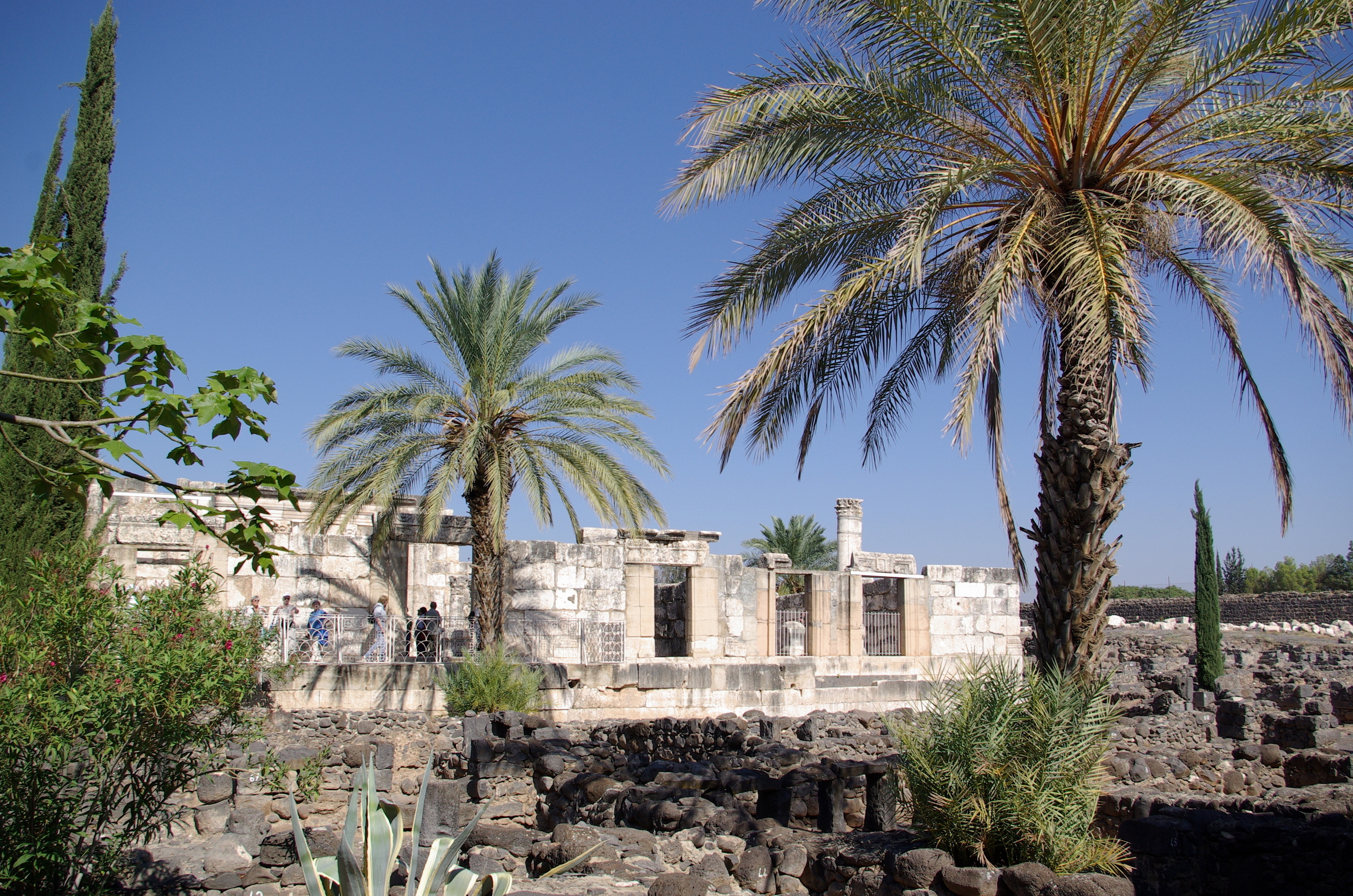
Ruins of an ancient synagogue in the late Roman town of Capernaum, Palaestina Secunda

Syria-Palaestina became organized under late Roman Empire as part of the Diocese of the East, in which it was included together with the provinces of Isauria, Cilicia, Cyprus (until 536), Euphratensis, Mesopotamia, Osroene, Coele-Syria, Syria Phoenice and Arabia Petraea. Under Byzantium, a new subdivision did further split the province of Cilicia into Cilicia Prima, Cilicia Secunda; Syria Palaestina was split into Palaestina Prima, Palaestina Secunda and eventually also Palaestina Salutaris (in 6th century). The major cities of the province were Scythopolis, Capernaum and Nazareth.

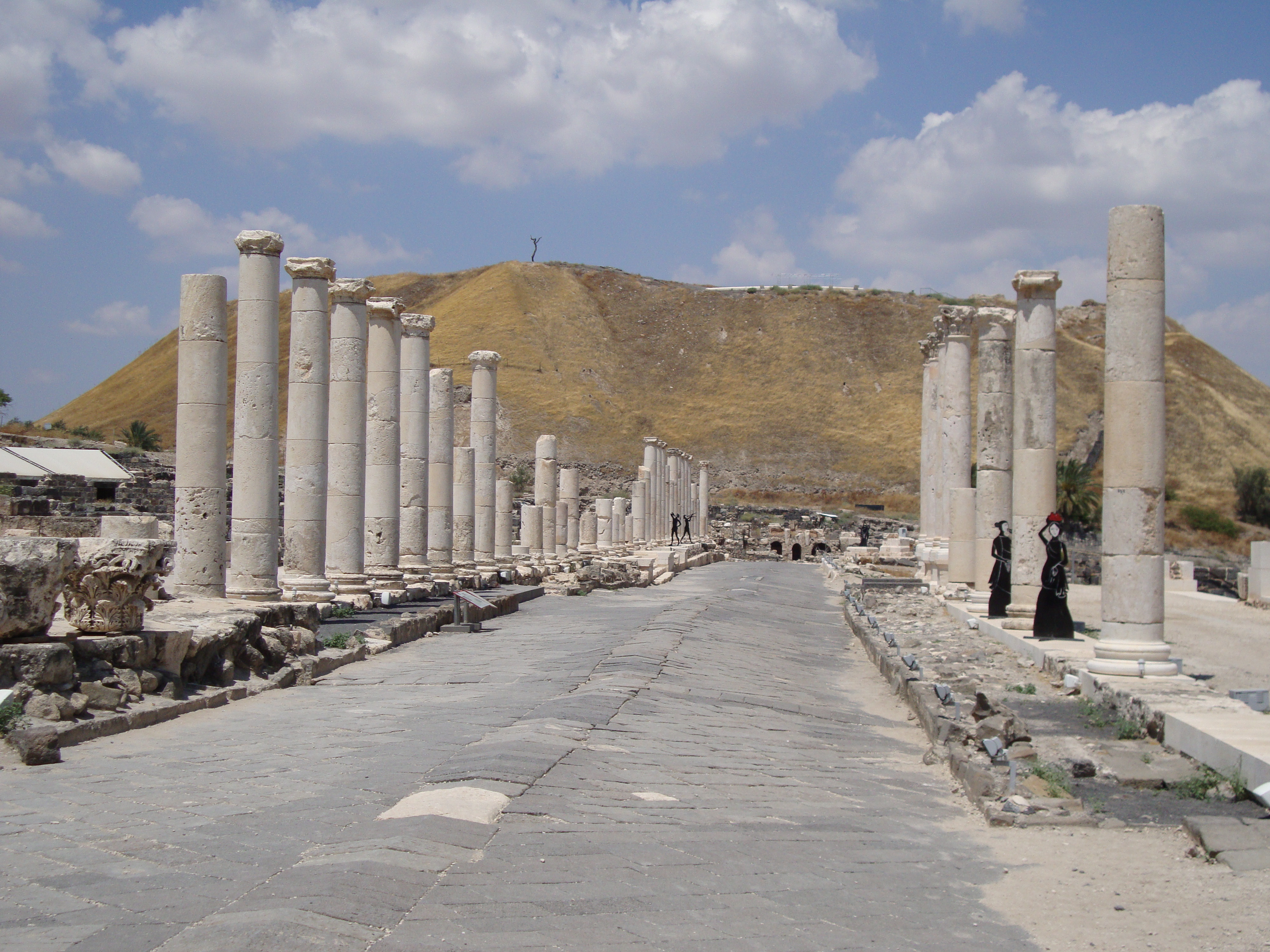
Roman street of Scythopolis in Bet She'an National Park, Israel

In the 5th and 6th centuries, Byzantines and their Christian Ghassanid allies took a major role in suppressing the Samaritan Revolts in neighbouring Palaestina Prima. By the 6th century Christian Ghassanids formed a Byzantine vassal confederacy with a capital on the Golan, forming a buffer state between the Byzantine Empire and the Arabian tribes.

In 614, both Palaestina Prima and Palaestina Secunda were conquered by a joint Sasanian-Jewish army. The leader of the Jewish rebels was Benjamin of Tiberias, a man of "immense wealth" according to Middle Age sources, and by Nehemiah ben Hushiel, a Jewish Exilarch. The event came as shock to the Christian society, as many of its churches were destroyed according to Christian sources of that period. After withdrawal of the Persian troops and the afterward surrender of the local Jewish rebels, the area was shortly reannexed into Byzantium in 628 CE.

Byzantine control of the province was again and irreversibly lost in 636, with the Muslim conquest of Syria. It was later roughly reorganized as Jund al-Urdunn military district of Bilad al-Sham (Syria) province of the Rashidun Caliphate.

== Demographics ==
Prior to the 6th century, the province of Palaestina Secunda largely included Jews, as well as a mixed Greek and Aramaic-speaking population, who were mostly practicing Christianity. The Jews had made Galilee and the Gaulanitis their center since the defeat of the Bar Kokhba revolt of the 2nd century; and flourished through the 4th and 5th centuries, as Byzantine control of the area dimmed, providing a great deal of autonomy for local populations.

North-Eastern parts of the province were also inhabited by pagan Itureans, who lived in more significant numbers in the neighbouring Phoenicia and Phoenicia Libani provinces to the north. Christian Arab Ghassanids migrated to the province from Yemen in around 4th and 5th centuries and settled the Gaulanitis, as well as former territories of Arabia Petraea province, creating a buffer Byzantine client kingdom in the 6th century, with the capital on the Gaulanitis - the North-Eastern border of Palaestina Secunda.

In the early 7th century, the province experienced a significant demographic collapse due to the consequences of the Byzantine-Persian war and the Jewish rebellion. Following the short-lived restoration of Byzantine rule, the Muslim armies caused the flight of a significant portion of the Christians to the north - into territories of northern Syria and Anatolia still ruled by the Byzantines.

== Religion ==
=== Judaism ===
The province of Palaestina Secunda was a thriving center of Judaism through the 4th and 5th centuries, where the Jerusalem Talmud was compiled. The primary Jewish authority, the Sanhedrin, existed in Tiberias until the early 5th century, before being abolished by the Byzantine authorities. The last Nasi (president) of the Sanhedrin was Gamaliel VI, who died in 425. After his death, the Byzantine Emperor Theodosius II did not allow for a successor, and in 429 terminated the patriarchate.

=== Christianity ===
The conversion of Constantine set in motion events that restored Palestine as a major theater in the development of the Christian church, as it had not been since 70. Only a few Minim (probably including Jewish Christians) had lived in few Galilean towns such as Sepphoris and Capernaum. However, beginning in the 4th century the Byzantine government responded to Christian interest in the Holy Land by embarking on a massive program of patronage, especially church-building, that encouraged Christians to move to Palestine. Less successfully, imperial policy tried to encourage Jews to convert to Christianity by offering protection and rewards. Eventually, as a result of Christian settlement in the vicinities of Nazareth and Capernaum (where a synagogue and a church lie almost across the street from each other) and Tabgha, Galilee lost its Jewish majority.

=== Roman cult and paganism ===
Small minority of pagans - whether non-Christian Romans and Hellenists or Itureans had been populating the province during early Byzantine rule.

== Economy ==
Modern scholars concur that Palaestina Secunda, and more specifically Galilee, produced and exported high quality olive oil in large numbers. Galilee was a long-standing oil producer for centuries, as already evidenced by Josephus in the first century CE. Rabbinic literature of the Byzantine era references Galilean olive oil as well as the olive oil made at Capernaum and Scythopolis. The Palestinian-Phoenician coast's general riches was mentioned in the Expositio Totius Mundi.

== See also ==
- Palestina Salutaris
- Coele-Syria
- Iudaea Province
