= West Bank and Gaza Strip =

West Bank and Gaza Strip corresponds to several largely coextensive geopolitical constructs:

- West Bank and Gaza Strip, two entities arising from the establishment of Israel in 1948 and the Israeli occupation of 1967 within former Mandatory Palestine.
- Palestinian territories or the occupied Palestinian territories (oPt), comprising the West Bank and the Gaza Strip.
- State of Palestine, a partially recognized de jure sovereign UN observer state, de facto occupied by Israel
- West Bank Areas in the Oslo II Accord, generally referring to Areas A, B (under Palestinian civil control), and C within the West Bank, with similar arrangements also applying to the Gaza Strip.
- Yesha, a Hebrew acronym for "Yehuda Shomron 'Azza" "Judea, Samaria", corresponding to the West Bank and "Gaza" (Strip) combined.

== See also ==
- Palestinian National Authority
- Israeli Civil Administration
- Israeli Military Governorate
  - Status of territories occupied by Israel in 1967
  - Israeli-occupied territories
- Palestine (disambiguation)
- Judea and Samaria Area, a term used by Israeli authorities to refer to Area C of the West Bank
