= Palestine, West Virginia =

Palestine, West Virginia may refer to:

- Palestine, Greenbrier County, West Virginia, an unincorporated community in Greenbrier County
- Palestine, Wirt County, West Virginia, an unincorporated community in Wirt County
