= Antiochus of Palestine =

Start of Antiochus' Pandects in Bodleian Library, MS. Barocci 227 from the first quarter of the 14th century

Antiochus of Palestine (fl. 7th century AD), also known as Antiochus the Monk or Antiochus Monachus (Άντίοχος ό Μοναχός), was a Christian monk and writer.

He is believed to have been born near Ancyra (now Ankara, Turkey). He lived first as a solitary, then became a monk and archimandrite of the famous lavra of Mar Saba near Jerusalem. He witnessed the Persian invasion of Palestine in 614, and the massacre of forty-four of his companions by the Bedouins.

In 619, five years after the conquest of the Holy Land by Chosroes, Ancyra was taken and destroyed by the Persians, which compelled the monks of the neighbouring monastery of Attaline to leave their home, and to move from place to place. As they were, naturally, unable to carry many books with them, the Abbot Eustathius asked his friend Antiochus to compile an abridgment of Holy Scripture for their use, and also a short account of the martyrdom of the forty-four monks of St. Sabbas.

In compliance with this request he wrote a work known as the Pandects of Holy Scripture (in 130 chapters, mistaken by the Latin translator for as many homilies). It is a collection of moral sentences, drawn from Scripture and from early ecclesiastical writers. He also wrote an Exomologesis or prayer, in which he relates the miseries that had befallen Jerusalem since the Persian invasion, and begs the divine mercy to heal the Holy City's many ills. These works seem to have been written in the period between the conquest of Palestine by Chosroes and its reconquest by the Emperor Heraclius in 628.

The introductory chapter of the Pandects tells of the martyrdom referred to; its last chapter contains a list of heretics from Simon Magus to the Monophysite followers of Severus of Antioch. The book is of special value for its extracts of works no longer existing; the writer had an interest, then uncommon, in early Christian literature.

In Eastern Orthodox liturgy, one of the compline prayers is attributed to him.

It has been conjectured that Antiochus was the same person as the Sabaite monk Strategius, who wrote an account of the Sasanian conquest of Jerusalem. This has not been proved.
