= Israel and Palestine =

Israel and Palestine or Palestine and Israel may refer to:

- Israeli–Palestinian conflict
  - History of the Israeli–Palestinian conflict
  - Israeli–Palestinian peace process
- Israel–Palestine relations
- Israel-Palestine, term sometimes used to refer to the entire territory encompassing Green Line Israel and the Palestinian territories

== See also ==
- Mandatory Palestine
- Palestine (region)
- Land of Israel
- Southern Levant
- Israel (disambiguation)
- Palestine (disambiguation)
