= Sasanian conquest of Jerusalem =

Part of the Byzantine–Sasanian War of 602–628

- Part of the Byzantine–Sasanian War of 602–628
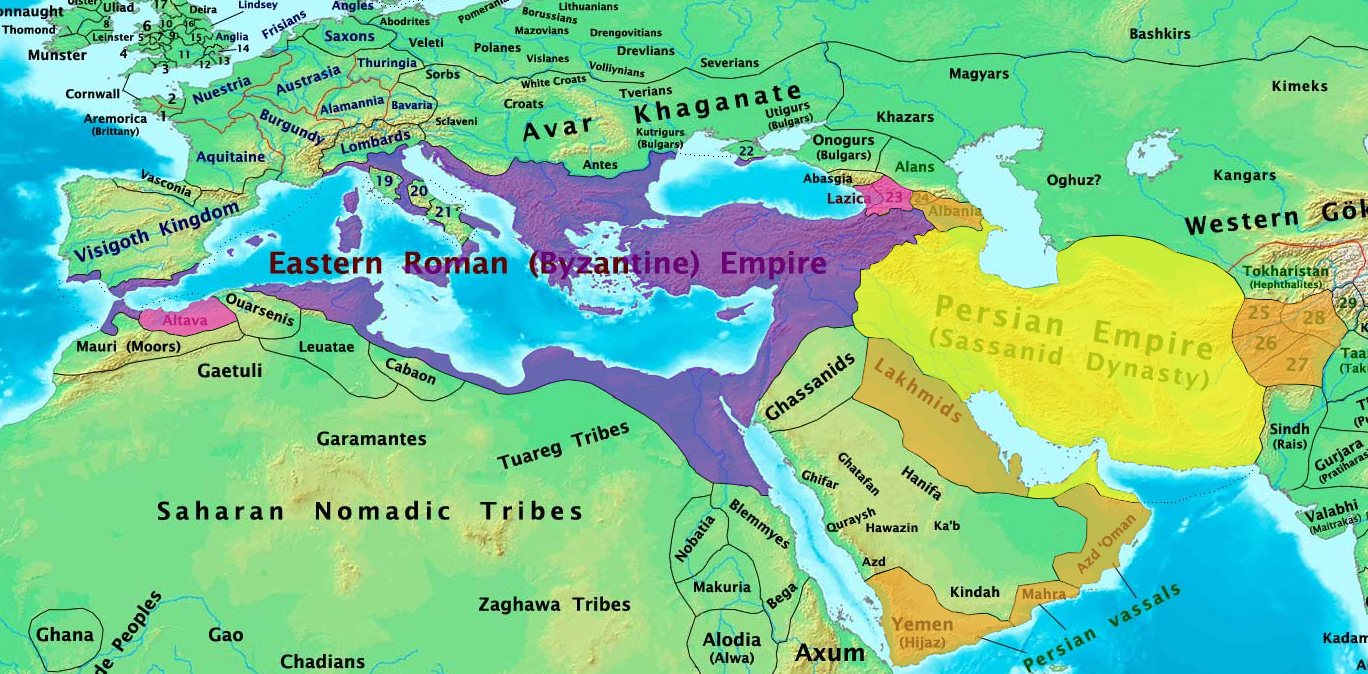
- Territory controlled by the Byzantines (purple) and the Sasanians (yellow) in 600 CE
Date	April–May 614 CE (per Sebeos and Antiochus)
Location	Jerusalem, Byzantine Empire 31°47′N 35°13′E
Result	Sasanian victory
Territorial changes	Jerusalem and Palaestina Prima annexed by the Sasanian Empire

Belligerents
Byzantine Empire	Sasanian Empire; Anti-Heraclian Jews

Commanders and leaders
Heraclius; Zacharias	Khosrow II; Shahrbaraz; Nehemiah ben Hushiel; Benjamin of Tiberias (executed)

Strength
Unknown	Unknown number of Sasanian forces 20,000–26,000 Jewish rebels

Casualties and losses
Disputed	Disputed
- According to Sebeos: 17,000 Christians were killed According to later Christian sources: 66,509 Christians were killed during the siege (exaggerated) 4,518 Jews were killed during the revolt

The Sasanian conquest of Jerusalem in early 614 was a significant development in the Byzantine–Sasanian War of 602–628. It was the result of a major offensive by the Sasanian Empire across the Fertile Crescent, culminating in the annexation of Jerusalem and Palaestina Prima as a whole. The Sasanian advance had been bolstered by the timely outbreak of the Jewish revolt against Heraclius, owing to decades of persecution of Jews and Samaritans by the Byzantine Empire, although the Heraclian dynasty itself had only been in power for four years.

In 613, Sasanian king Khosrow II had appointed his army chief Shahrbaraz to lead a campaign into the Byzantines' Diocese of the East. Under Shahrbaraz's command, the Sasanian army proceeded to secure victories at Antioch and Caesarea Maritima, which was the administrative capital of Palaestina Prima. By this time, the grand inner harbour had silted up and was useless, but the city continued to be an important maritime hub after Byzantine emperor Anastasius I Dicorus ordered the outer harbour's reconstruction. Successfully capturing the city and the harbour had given the Sasanians strategic access to the Mediterranean Sea, and their ranks were reinforced by Nehemiah ben Hushiel and Benjamin of Tiberias, who enlisted and armed Jewish rebels throughout Galilee, including the cities of Tiberias and Nazareth. In total, between 20,000 and 26,000 Jewish rebels joined the Sasanian army's assault on Byzantine Jerusalem. By mid-614, the Sasanians had taken the city, but sources vary on whether this occurred without resistance from the Byzantine army or after a siege and breaching of the wall with artillery.

In the aftermath of the fall of Jerusalem to the Sasanian–Jewish alliance, the city initially descended into chaos and disorder, although reconstruction began soon. On Khosrow's orders, the Sasanian army located the True Cross, which Christians believe was used to crucify Jesus in 30 or 33, and moved it to Ctesiphon. The Sasanian conquest interrupted the centuries-long Byzantine ban on Jewish entry into Jerusalem, and Jews were able to enter the city for the first time since the Bar Kokhba revolt in 136. Sources for Christian casualties during this period vary greatly, with some placing the number of dead and wounded in the low thousands and others in the tens of thousands or higher. The Byzantines eventually recovered their lost territories before being pushed out indefinitely by the Muslim conquest of the Levant in 638, whereafter the ban on Jews was lifted and Christian rule over Jerusalem ended until the Crusades.

== Background ==
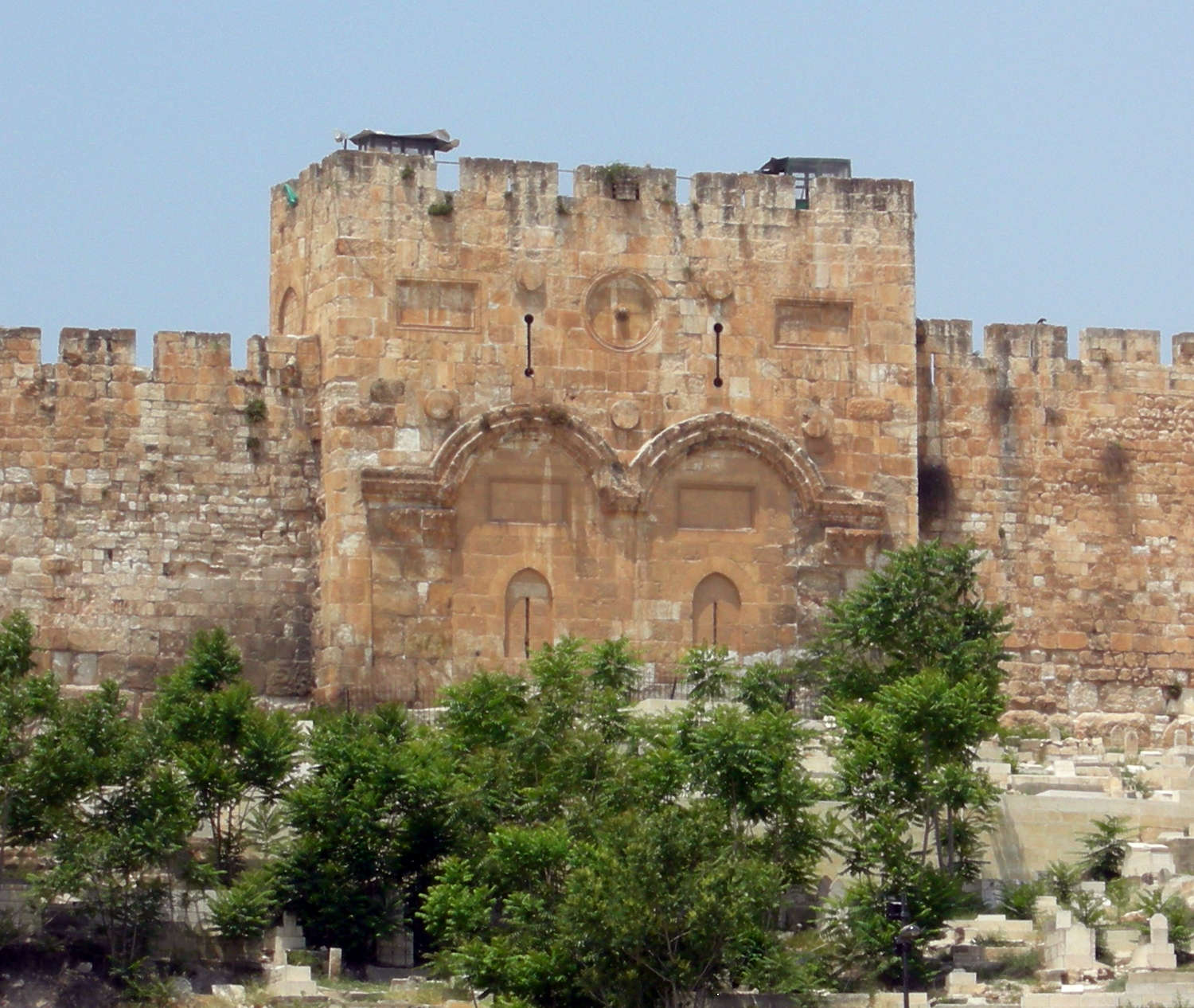
The Golden Gate likely built around 520 CE.

=== Persecution of Jews and Samaritans ===
Jews and Samaritans were persecuted frequently by the Byzantines resulting in numerous revolts. Byzantine religious propaganda developed strong anti-Jewish elements. In several cases Jews tried to help support the Sasanian advance. A pogrom in Antioch in 608 would lead to a Jewish revolt in 610 which was crushed. Jews also revolted in both Tyre and Acre in 610. The Jews of Tyre were massacred in reprisal. Unlike in earlier times when Jews had supported Christians in the fight against Shapur I, the Byzantines had now become viewed as oppressors.

=== Bar Kokhba revolt ===
Following the Bar Kokhba revolt in 135 CE, Jews were prohibited from entering the city. Constantine allowed Jews to enter for one day each year, during the holiday of Tisha B'Av. In 438 CE, the Empress Eudocia removed the ban on Jews entering the city. However, following violent Christian opposition, the ban was reinstated. The ban on settlement was maintained until the Arab conquest, except during the reign of the emperor Julian and from 614–617 under the Persians. Due to these circumstances Jerusalem is thought to have had only a small Jewish population prior to the events of 614.

== Jewish rebellion and Sasanian advance ==
Following the unopposed capture of Jerusalem, control of the city was handed to Nehemiah ben Hushiel and Benjamin of Tiberias. Nehemiah was then appointed the ruler of Jerusalem. He began making arrangements for the building of the Third Temple, and sorting out genealogies to establish a new High Priesthood. After only a few months, a Christian revolt occurred. Nehemiah ben Hushiel and his council of sixteen righteous were killed along with many other Jews, some throwing themselves off the city walls.

Following the outburst of violence in Jerusalem the surviving Jews fled to Shahrbaraz's encampment at Caesarea. Christians were able to briefly retake the city before the walls were breached by Shahrbaraz's forces who lay siege to the city. According to Antiochus Strategos, the abbot Modestos set out to Jericho where he mustered a force from the Byzantine troops which were garrisoned there. However, once the Byzantine troops caught sight of the overwhelming Persian army encamped outside the city walls, they fled, fearing a suicidal battle. Sources vary on how long the siege lasted. Depending on the source it lasted 19, 20 or 21 days.

=== Christian casualties ===
According to Sebeos the siege resulted in a total Christian death toll of 17,000. However, other sources put the number much higher, claiming over 60,000 dead. Similarly, estimates on the number massacred near the Mamilla reservoir varies, with separate sources providing numbers of 4,518 and 24,518. Israeli archaeologist Ronny Reich estimates a death toll of 60,000 people before the Persian authorities put an end to the killing. In addition, around 35,000 to 37,000 people, including the patriarch Zacharias, are said to have been deported to be sold into slavery. The city is said to have been burnt down, however, neither wide spread burning nor destruction of churches have been found in the archaeological record. The search for the True Cross is said to have involved the torture of clergymen. Once found, the True Cross was carried off to Ctesiphon.

Modestos was appointed over the city. Damage was done to many Christian churches and other buildings. By the first half of 616 order had been restored in Jerusalem and Modestos had authorized the reoccupation of St Sabas. Reconstruction on the following churches was under way: Church of the Holy Sepulchre, Golgotha, the 'mother of churches' at Sion and Chapel of the Ascension. Modestos' letter gives the impression that the reconstruction of these sites was already completed. However this is unlikely to be the case. By 617 CE, the Persians had reversed their policy and sided with the Christians over the Jews, probably because of pressure from Mesopotamian Christians in Persia itself. However it does not appear that Jews were violently expelled from Jerusalem, as Sebeos thought. Instead Modestos' letter and other sources seem to imply that further Jewish settlers were banned from settling in or around Jerusalem. A small synagogue on the Temple Mount was also demolished. Following the change in policy the condition of the Mesopotamian deportees also improved. Sebeos records that they were each resettled according to their prior trade.

=== Sasanian rule ===
Rebuilding of the city began soon after the Sasanian takeover. John the Merciful, the Byzantine Patriarch of Alexandria, assisted by sending materials. After 617 AD, the Sasanians banned further migration of Jews into the city, and major reconstruction was commenced at this time, supported by Khosrow II's Christian minister Yazdin as well as the funds raised by Modestus (who replaced Patriarch Zacharias) from the Christians in the region.

=== Byzantine–Sasanian peace agreement ===
In 628, following the deposition of Khosrau II, Kavadh II made peace with Heraclius giving Palaestina Prima and the True Cross back to the Byzantines. The conquered city and the Holy Cross would remain in Sasanian hands until they were returned by Shahrbaraz. Shahrbaraz and his son Niketas, who converted to Christianity, would control Jerusalem until at least the late summer/early autumn of 629. On March 21 630 Heraclius marched in triumph into Jerusalem with the True Cross.

Heraclius came as victor into the Land of Israel and the Jews of Tiberias and Nazareth, under the leadership of Benjamin of Tiberias, surrendered and asked for his protection. It is said that Benjamin even accompanied Heraclius on his voyage to Jerusalem and Benjamin was persuaded to convert, Benjamin obtained a general pardon for himself and the Jews. He was baptized in Nablus in the house of Eustathios, an influential Christian. However once Heraclius reached Jerusalem he was persuaded to go back on his promise to Benjamin of Tiberias. According to Eutychius (887–940), the Christians population and monks of Jerusalem convinced the Emperor to break his word. Some modern scholars ascribe the story of the "Oath of Heraclius" to the realm of legend doubting that Heraclius ever made such a promise, instead ascribing this as a product of later apologists. In atonement for the violation of the emperor's oath to the Jews, the monks are said to have pledged themselves to a yearly fast, which is still observed by the Copts, called the Fast of Heraclius. Jews were expelled from Jerusalem and were not allowed to settle within a three-mile radius. A general massacre of the Jewish population ensued.

== Written sources ==
=== Sebeos' account ===
The Armenian bishop and historian Sebeos wrote an account of the fall of Jerusalem. Sebeos' account does not use the polemical language of Antiochus. Sebeos writes that at first the inhabitants of Jerusalem voluntarily submitted to the Jews and Persians, however after a few months the governor appointed by Khosrau II to rule Jerusalem was killed in a Christian revolt.

Various dates for the revolt have been given: 9 April or 19 May 614, and 25 June 615. Sebeos writes that during the revolt many Jews were killed. Some throwing themselves off the city walls to escape. The remaining Jews fled to the Sasanian general. Different names are given for this general: Khoream, Erazmiozan and Xorheam However they are all thought to refer to Shahrbaraz, who was known to Armenian sources as Khoream. Shahrbaraz's campaigns are well documented by other sources helping to put time constraints on the siege. Shahrbaraz assembled his troops and went and encamped around Jerusalem and besieged it for 19 days. The walls were breached by undermining the foundations. The Christian death toll of 17,000 was later corrupted to 57,000 in T'ovma Artsruni work History of the House of the Artsrunik'. 35,000 people including the patriarch Zacharias were deported to Mesopotamia. For three days the Persian forces slaughtered and plundered the inhabitants of the city. The city was burnt down. The Jews were then driven from the city and an archpriest named Modestos was appointed over the city.

=== Antiochus' account ===
Antiochus Strategos was a 7th-century Byzantine Greek monk living in Palaestina Prima. Again dates for the start of the siege vary. Dates given are April 13 614, April 15 614, May 3 614 or May 5 614. On the twentieth day or according to the Georgian text the twenty-first day the walls were breached. Ballistae were used to bring down the walls. According to Antiochus, shortly after the Persian army entered Jerusalem, an "unprecedented looting and sacrilege" took place. In his words "church after church was burned down alongside the innumerable Christian artifacts, which were stolen or damaged by the ensuing arson". Antiochus Strategos further claimed that captive Christians were gathered near Mamilla reservoir and the Jews offered to help them escape death if they "become Jews and deny Christ". The Christian captives refused, and the Jews in anger purchased the Christians from the Persians and massacred them on the spot. Antiochus wrote:

Then the Jews... as of old they bought the Lord from the Jews with silver, so they purchased Christians out of the reservoir; for they gave the Persians silver, and they bought a Christian and slew him like a sheep.

Some versions of Antiochus' manuscript record a total Christian death tolls as high as 66,509. Other copies report approximately half this number. The greatest number were found at Mamilla 24,518 corpses; many more than were found anywhere else in the city. Other copies of Strategos's manuscripts report fewer corpses were found at Mamilla, 4,518 or 4,618 corpses. Antiochus' work was originally written in Greek. Only Arabic and Georgian translations survive.

=== Dionysius' account ===
Dionysius of Tel Mahre's account was written much later in the 9th century. It gives a body count of 90,000. This number is thought to be dubious.

=== Theophanes' account ===
Theophanes the Confessor another 9th-century author records that "some say it was 90,000" in reference to the number of Christians killed.

=== Sefer Zerubbabel ===
The Sefer Zerubbabel is a medieval Hebrew apocalypse written in the style of biblical visions (e.g. Daniel, Ezekiel) placed into the mouth of Zerubbabel. It is thought to have been written at least partially during the beginning of the 7th century.

In the Sefer Zerubbabel Aaron's rod, Elijah and Nehemiah ben Hushiel will be hidden in the city of Tiberias. After Nehemiah ben Hushiel takes' possession of Jerusalem he proceeds to sorts out Israel's genealogical lists according to their families. He is killed in the fifth year which would be 619 during the month of Av (July – August). The Sefer Zerubbabel states that Shiroi King of Persia will stab Nehemiah ben Hushiel and Israel. His thoroughly crushed corpse will be thrown down before the gates of Jerusalem. And sixteen of the righteous shall be killed with him. Armilus enters Jerusalem on the 14th day of the new year during the month of Nisan. Assuming the year is 628. This would coincide to March 28 628.

Kavadh II made peace with Heraclius in 628 after the reign of Khosrau II. Armilus is thought to be a cryptogram for Heraclius.

=== Poems by Eleazar ben Kalir ===
Three piyyut attributed to Eleazar ben Killir are thought to be based on an early version of the Sefer Zerubbabel.

The first is believed to be dated between 629 and 634. In the text the Jews set up an altar and offer sacrifices, however they are not allowed to erect a sanctuary. The Jewish leader who is called Messiah ben Joseph arises among them and within three months reaches the top. However he is killed by the Persian chief commander in a small sanctuary shortly after.

In a second piyyut, which is undatable, Messiah ben Joseph is named as Nehemiah ben Hushiel.

A third piyyut titled "Oto ha-yom" is dated later, as the Persians have been defeated by the Byzantines. However, a king from Arabia then invades. This poem is thought to data from the early years of the Arab invasion. Nehemiah ben Hushiel is not mentioned. The Messiah ben David of the Sefer Zerubbabel, Menahem ben Ammiel, is now called Messiah ben Joseph.

=== In the Quran ===
The fall of Palaestina Prima to the Persians was mentioned as a contemporary event in the 30th sūrah of the Qur'an, Sūrat ar-Rūm. It went on to predict the imminent defeat of the Persians by the Byzantines:

"The Romans have been defeated in a nearby land, and they, after their defeat, will be victorious. In a few years -- God's is the command before and after that -- and on that day the believers will rejoice, with the Help of God. He helps whom He pleases; and He is the Mighty, the Merciful." Qur'an 30:1-6

=== Other sources ===
Historians have been able to piece together the events following the fall of Jerusalem based on other sources as well. A brief abridged list of the many relevant documents is given below.

Muhammad ibn Jarir al-Tabari and the Khuzistan Chronicle both report that the search for fragments of the true cross involved torturing clergymen. The Opusculum de Persica captivitate is a document attributed to Modestos. It gives a death toll of 65,000. This number may give an idea of the total Christian population in and around Jerusalem. The Chronicon Paschale is notable because it does not accuse the Jews of anti-Christian violence or sedition during the fall of Jerusalem in 614. It is loosely dated to June 614. Another important document is Modestos' Letter.

== Archaeological evidence ==
While the claims of large scale destruction of churches and other religious sites have not been confirmed with archaeological evidence, there does exist archaeological evidence of widespread killings during the time of the Persian invasion.

A significant number of burial sites were allocated according to Strategos. A mass burial grave at Mamilla cave was discovered in 1989 by Israeli archeologist Ronny Reich near the site where Strategos recorded the massacre took place. The large number of bones "suggests that thousands of people were buried there," though the poor preservation permitted the identification of only 526 individuals. Other mass burial sites have also been found although they cannot be accurately dated to the Persian conquest of Jerusalem. Yet, excavations of Jerusalem show a continuous habitation in Jerusalem neighborhoods and essentially little impact of population during the period of Persian governorship. As stated by archaeologist Gideon Avni:

... all excavated sites in Jerusalem show a clear pattern of continuity, with no evidence for destruction by the Persian conquest of 614 or the Arab conquest of 636.

Demographic continuity might have resulted from population exchange by the victorious Jewish rebels, but apparently also the Christian habitation remained relatively constant, despite the disturbance by the Persian conquest, and no significant impact on the population of Jerusalem was made during the following period of Sassanid-Jewish dominance.

In 2013, a treasure was found in the Old City of Jerusalem by archaeologists, containing a large hoard of Persian coins from the 5th to early 7th centuries and a golden medallion. According to Hebrew University archaeologist Dr. Eilat Mazar, the contents of the discovery in early September 2013 were two bundles containing thirty-six gold coins, gold and silver jewelry, and a gold medallion, ten centimeters in diameter, adorned with images of a menorah, a shofar and a Torah scroll. The item is thought to have been a decoration to hang around a Torah scroll as a breast plate. The find was discovered in a ruined Byzantine public structure a mere 50 meters from the Temple Mount's southern wall. The way the items were found suggests one bundle was carefully hidden underground, whereas the second was apparently abandoned in haste and scattered across the floor. Given dating, Dr. Mazar suggested the items were abandoned following the Christian re-establishment of control of the city. Since there was only a small Jewish presence in Jerusalem during the Byzantine period, Mazar thinks the treasure was brought to the city by Jewish emissaries after the Persian conquest in 614 CE.

== See also ==
- Jewish–Roman wars
- List of conflicts in the Near East
- Monastery of the Virgins
- Siege of Jerusalem (disambiguation), list of sieges for, and battles of, Jerusalem

== Primary sources ==
- Antiochus Strategos, The Capture of Jerusalem by the Persians in 614 AD, F. C. Conybeare, English Historical Review 25 (1910) pp. 502–517.
- Sebeos chapter 24, [Robert Bedrosian]
- Sefer Zerubbabel, [John C. Reeves. University of North Carolina at Charlotte.]
