= Strategius =

Start of an 11th-century copy of the Georgian text, from a manuscript written by Prochorus the Iberian and now in the Bodleian Library

Strategius was a 7th-century monk of Mar Saba. He wrote a sermon on the siege and sack of Jerusalem in 614 and its aftermath, the forcible relocation of some of its inhabitants to Ctesiphon and the efforts of the Patriarch Zacharias to stiffen their faith in the face of persecution. Despite some deficiencies, this "account is of great value to the historian, as long as it is handled judiciously" and is "perhaps the single most important historical source for events in Jerusalem and the Holy Land in the decades immediately prior to the Islamic invasion and conquest".

Although originally written in Greek, the Greek text is lost. The sermon survives in Georgian, Arabic, and Syriac translations, with the Syriac being a translation of the Arabic. The Georgian text is found in three manuscripts. The earliest dates to around 1040 and was copied at the Monastery of the Cross in Jerusalem. In a later 13th-century copy, it covers sixty-six octavo pages. The full Arabic translation is found in three manuscripts and an abridged version in two more. Both the Georgian and Arabic versions have been published along with translations into Latin. Nikolai Marr translated the Georgian text into Russian. He argued that the Georgian translation was made from an Arabic version in the 10th century. There is also a partial English translation from Georgian.

Strategius, sometimes called Antiochos Strategos, has been tentatively identified with the monk Antiochus of Palestine, but this is unproven.

Due to his claim that, during the Jewish revolt against Heraclius, the Jews massacred 25,000 Christian prisoners for refusing to convert to Judaism, Strategius has been accused of exaggerating the events out of antisemitism. However, a mass grave at Mamilla cave was discovered in 1989 by Israeli archeologist Ronny Reich near one of the sites where Strategius recorded that the massacre took place. The human remains were in poor condition, allowing the identification of only 526 individuals out of thousands of suspected victims.

== Translations ==
- Strategius (2024). The Capture of Jerusalem by the Persians in 614 CE by Strategius of Mar Saba. Translated by Anthony, Sean; Shoemaker, Stephen. Institute for the Study of Ancient Cultures.

== Bibliography ==
- Conybeare, Frederick C. (1910). "Antiochus Strategos' Account of the Sack of Jerusalem in A.D. 614". The English Historical Review. 25 (99): 502–517. JSTOR 549886.
- Garitte, Gérard, ed. (1960). La Prise de Jérusalem par les Perses en 614. Louvain: Secrétariat du Corpus Scriptorum Christianorum Orientalium.
- Garitte, Gérard, ed. (1973). Expugnationis Hierosolymae A.D. 614 Recensiones Arabicae. Vol. I: A et B. Louvain: Secrétariat du Corpus Scriptorum Christianorum Orientalium.
- Garitte, Gérard, ed. (1974). Expugnationis Hierosolymae A.D. 614 Recensiones Arabicae. Vol. II: C et V. Louvain: Secrétariat du Corpus Scriptorum Christianorum Orientalium.
- Howard-Johnston, James (2010). Witnesses to a World Crisis: Historians and Histories of the Middle East in the Seventh Century. Oxford: Oxford University Press.
- Hoyland, Robert G. (1997). Seeing Islam As Others Saw It: A Survey and Evaluation of Christian, Jewish and Zoroastrian Writings on Early Islam. Feltham: Darwin Press.
- Kazhdan, Alexander (1991). "Antiochos Strategos". In Kazhdan, Alexander (ed.). The Oxford Dictionary of Byzantium. Oxford and New York: Oxford University Press. ISBN 0-19-504652-8.
