= Palestine, Indiana =

Palestine, Indiana may refer to:

- Palestine, Kosciusko County, Indiana
- Palestine, Franklin County, Indiana
- Palestine, Lawrence County, Indiana
- New Palestine, Indiana
- Poseyville, Indiana (in Posey County), originally named Palestine

== See also ==
- Palestine (disambiguation)
