= Palestina =

Palestina may refer to:

== Hebrew ==
- Palestina (EY), English transliteration of the official Hebrew (פלשתינה (א״י, a name for Palestine in use during Mandatory Palestine (1920–1948), with EY meaning Eretz Yisrael (land of Israel)

== Other places ==
- Palestina de Goiás, Brazil
- Palestina, Alagoas, Brazil
- Palestina, São Paulo, Brazil
- Palestina, Huila, Colombia
- Palestina, Caldas, Colombia
- Palestina, Ecuador
  - Palestina Canton
- Palestina de Los Altos, Guatemala
- Palestina, Peru
- Palestina, United States Virgin Islands
- Nueva Palestina, in the Mexican state of Chiapas

== Other uses ==
- Palestina, a female professional wrestler from the Gorgeous Ladies of Wrestling

== See also ==
- Palaestina (disambiguation)
- Palestine (disambiguation)
- Palestyna (disambiguation)
- Palestrina, Lazio, an Italian city
- Syria Palaestina
