= Hezekiah's Pool =

Reservoir in the Old City of Jerusalem

Coordinates: 31°46′37.83″N 35°13′44.79″E

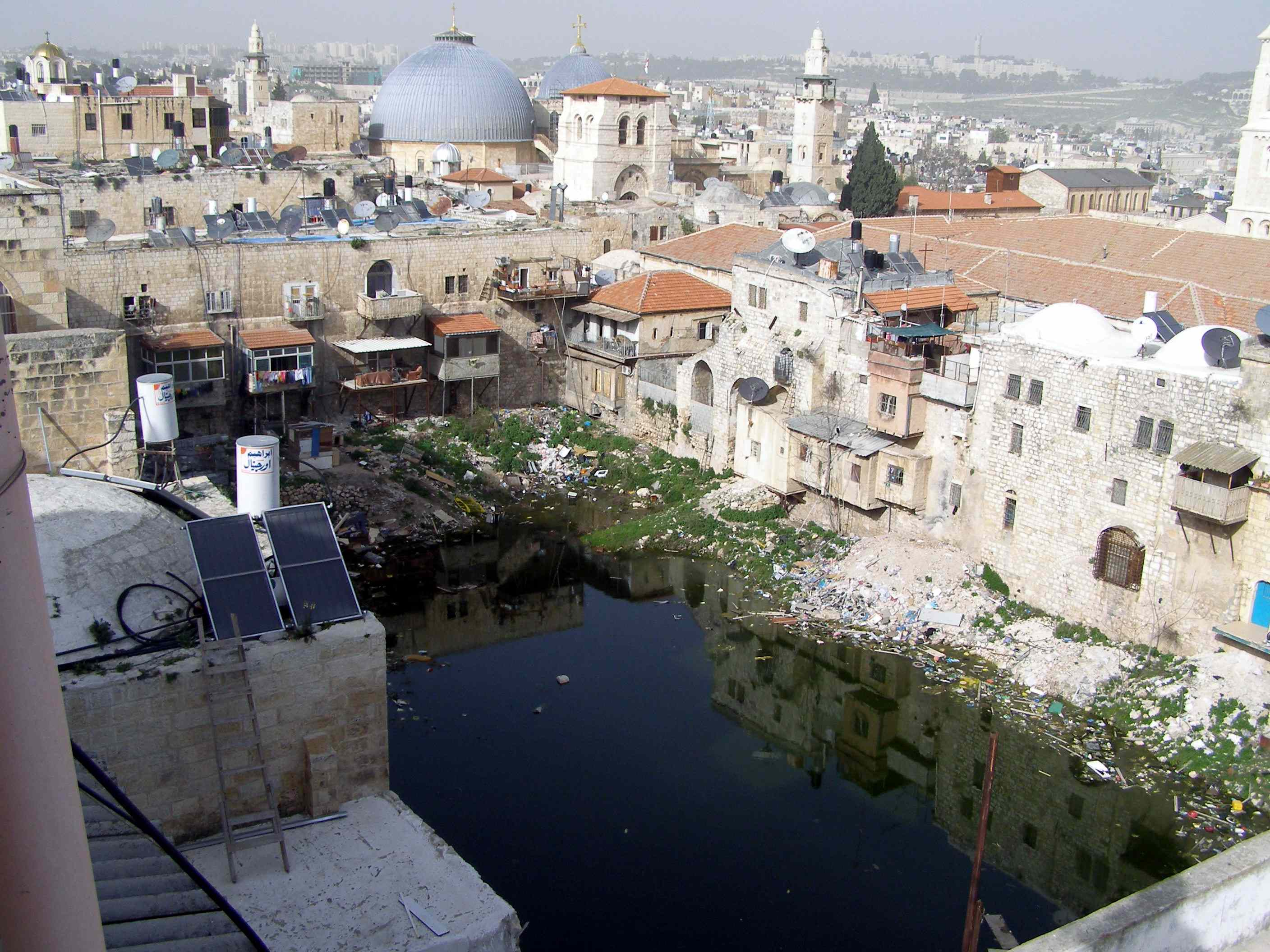
The pool in March 2010, partially filled with water

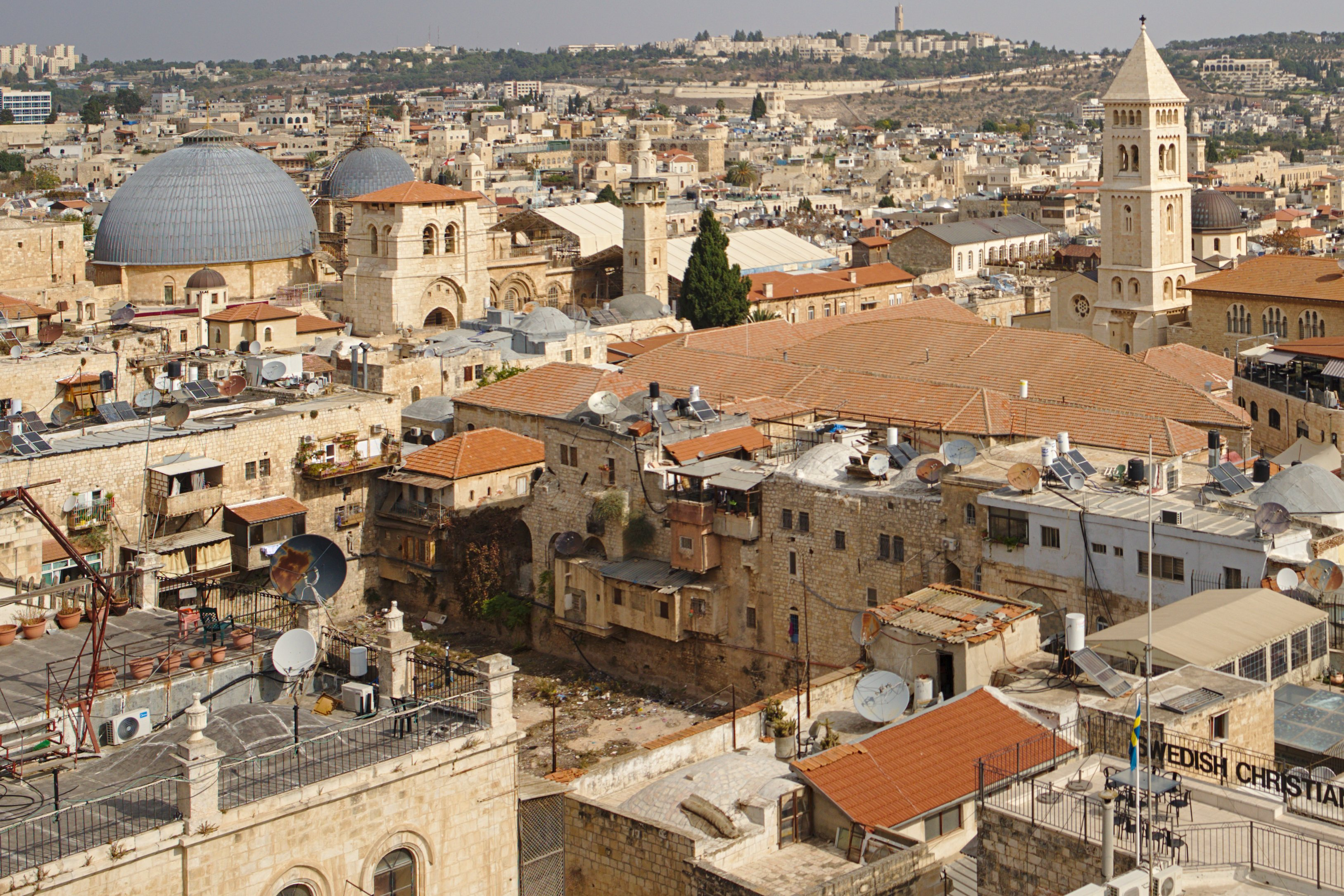
The pool in November 2019, totally dry

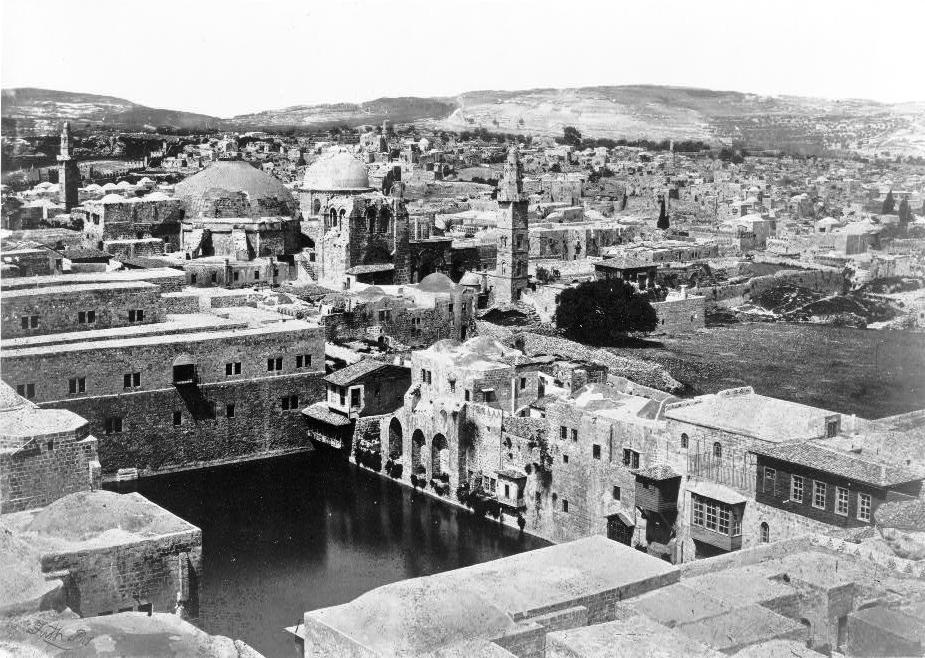
Hezekiah's Pool (1862); in the background is the double-domed Church of the Holy Sepulchre

Hezekiah's Pool (Hebrew: בריכת חזקיהו, Brikhat Hizkiyahu), or the Patriarch's Pool, located in the Christian Quarter of the Old City of Jerusalem, was once a reservoir forming part of the city's ancient water system.

== History ==
Flavius Josephus referred to the pool as Amygdalon, meaning 'almond tree' in Greek, but it is very likely that he derived the name phonetically from the Hebrew word מגדל migdal, meaning 'tower', thus it is believed that the original name was Pool of the Tower or Towers. The pool is also known as the Pool of Pillars, or the Pool of the Patriarch's Bath (Arabic: بركة حمّام البطرك Birkat Hammam el-Batrak).

The pool is believed to be the upper pool referred to in the Books of Kings (2 Kings 18:17), built by King Hezekiah (f. 700 BC), who met messengers from the king of Assyria there. At a later time it was fed from the Mamilla Pool, one of the three reservoirs constructed by Herod the Great during the first century BCE by an underground conduit which still partially exists.

The pool is 240 feet (73 m) by 140 feet (43 m) in size, with an estimated capacity of nearly 3,000,000 US gallons (11,000,000 L; 2,500,000 imp gal). The bottom of the pool is cemented and leveled natural rock. As of 2008, the pool is mostly dry and surrounded by buildings on all sides. It is used as a garbage dump.
