= Palestine (disambiguation) =

Palestine (Arabic: فلسطين, romanized: Filasṭīn), officially the State of Palestine, is a country in West Asia.

Palestine may also refer to:

== Places ==
- Palestine (region), an area in West Asia
- Mandatory Palestine or Palestine, 1920–1948 British administrative territory in the region of Palestine

=== United Kingdom ===
- Palestine, Hampshire, England

=== United States ===
- Palestine, Arkansas, a town
- Palestine, a community of Newtown, Connecticut
- Palestine, Illinois, a village
- Palestine Township, Woodford County, Illinois
- Palestine, Indiana (disambiguation)
- Palestine Township, Story County, Iowa
- Palestine Township, Cooper County, Missouri
- Palestine, Ohio, a village
- Palestine, Texas, a city
- Lake Palestine, Texas, a reservoir
- Palestine, Greenbrier County, West Virginia, an unincorporated community
- Palestine, Wirt County, West Virginia, an unincorporated community

== Arts and entertainment ==
- Palestine (graphic novel), a 2001 non-fiction graphic novel by Joe Sacco
- Palestine (poem), an 1803 poem by Reginald Heber
- Palestine, a 1912 American silent documentary film by Sidney Olcott
- "Palestine", a song by Kneecap on their 2026 album Fenian

== Other uses ==
- Palestine (2011 book), a compilation of statements by Ayatollah Ali Khamenei
- Charlemagne Palestine (born 1947), American composer
- Palestine (horse), a racehorse who won the 2,000 Guineas in 1950
- Palestine Hotel, Baghdad, Iraq
- Palestine Street, Baghdad, Iraq

== See also ==
- All-Palestine Government, a Palestinian Arab state proclaimed by the Arab League in 1948 and seated in Egyptian-occupied Gaza Strip
- Palestine Place, headquarters in London of the Church of England's organization Church's Ministry Among Jewish People
- New Palestine, Illinois, US
- East Palestine, Ohio, US
- New Palestine, Ohio, US
- Occupation of Palestine, set index
- Palaestina (disambiguation)
- Palestina (disambiguation)
- Palestyna (disambiguation)
- Palestrina, Lazio, a city in Italy
