= Palestyna =

Palestyna may refer to the following places:

- Palestyna, Łódź Voivodeship (central Poland)
- Palestyna, Podlaskie Voivodeship (north-east Poland)
- Palestyna, Warmian-Masurian Voivodeship (north Poland)

== See also ==
- Palestina (disambiguation)
