= Mamilla Pool =

Ancient reservoir in Jerusalem

- بركة مأمن الله - بركة ماملا (Arabic)
- Birket Mamilla
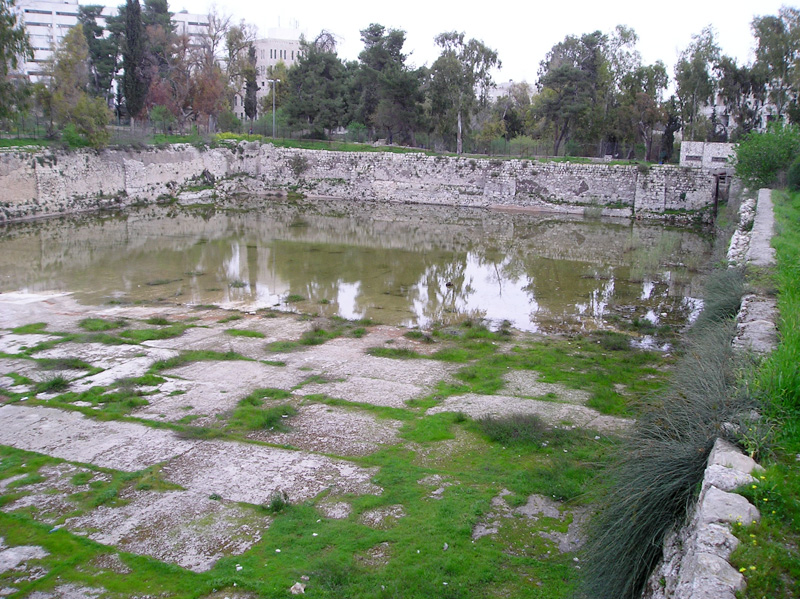
- Mamilla pool in Jerusalem, 2005
- Interactive map of Mamilla Pool
- 31°46′40″N 35°13′14″E
- Type: Ancient reservoir
- Location: Jerusalem

History
- Built: Unknown (possibly Herodian or Byzantine period)

Site notes
- Material: Stone, cement
- Height: 19 ft (5.8 m)
- Length: 316 ft (96 m)
- Width: 218 ft (66 m)
- Public access: Yes

Mamilla Pool (also known as Birket Mamilla) is one of several ancient reservoirs that supplied water to the inhabitants of Jerusalem. It is located outside the walls of the Old City about 650 metres (710 yd) northwest of Jaffa Gate in the centre of the Mamilla Cemetery. With a capacity of 30,000 cubic metres, it was connected by an underground channel to Hezekiah's Pool in the Christian Quarter of the Old City. It was believed to have received water via the Upper or High-Level Aqueduct from Solomon's Pools, but 2010 excavations discovered the aqueduct's final segment at a lower elevation near the Jaffa Gate, so functioning as feeding source for the Mamilla Pool seems unlikely.

== Etymology ==
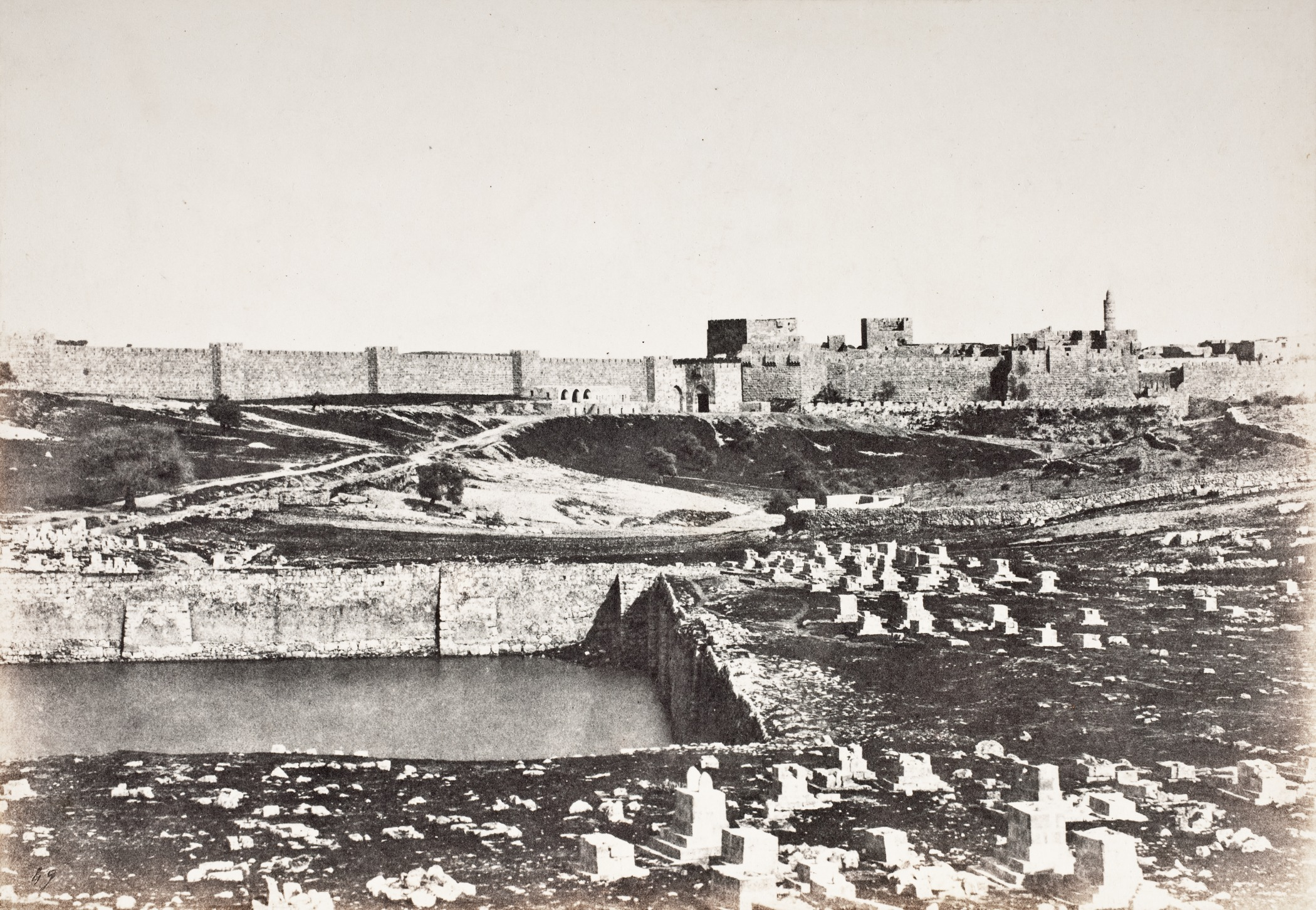
Birket Mamilla, 1854

There are a number of theories on the origin of the name Mamilla. John Gray writes that it may be a corruption of the Hebrew word for 'the filler' (m'malle'), though that is uncertain.According to Vincent and Abel, the name of the pool may be derived from a Byzantine-period woman, Mamilla being a Latin female name, possibly abbreviated from Maximilla. They mention in this context a 9th-century pilgrim who wrote that the pool was named after a pious matron, Mamilla, the wife of Thomas, who survived the 614 fall of the city. This they find to be plausible, conceding that there was no proof for the connection as of 1922. They further speculated that she might have sponsored the construction of the pool in a year of drought, for the benefit of the quarter adjacent to the Church of the Resurrection. Pringle concurs in 1993 with Vincent & Abel that it is more likely that the church was named after the pool, rather than the other way around, a theory proposed for instance by George Williams and Robert Willis in 1849, who saw the pool named for a church that once stood near the pool and dedicated to Saint Mamilla or Babila.

Yet another theory is that the name comes from the Arabic for "water from God" (ma'e min Allah).

== History ==
The original date of construction is unknown. Biblical scholar Edward Robinson speculated that the pool may have been the Upper Pool mentioned in the Book of Isaiah (Isaiah 36:2), seeing that it is the only pool situated on the highest ground outside of Jerusalem, and entraps the runoff waters of the upper watercourse of the Hinnom valley. Others have speculated that it may have been the Serpent's Pool mentioned by Josephus.

=== Roman period ===
A Herodian construction date, proposed by older researchers, has been disputed by more recent studies, which attribute the construction to the Byzantine period.The older theory is based on the fact that during the rule of Herod the Great (37–4 BCE), improvements were made to the water supply system in Jerusalem. It posits that two new pools constructed during his reign, the Pool of the Towers and the Serpent's Pool (Birket es-Sultan or Sultan's Pool), were fed by the Mamilla Pool via aqueducts. Itzik Schwiki of the Jerusalem Center Site Preservation Council attributes the construction of the Mamilla Pool itself to Herod.

=== Byzantine period ===
The theory that the pool was built during the Byzantine period was upheld by researchers for at least a century.Following the Persian capture of Jerusalem from the Byzantines in 614, local Jews aided the Persian forces and carried out a massacre of Christian prisoners near Mamilla pool.While the figures may be exaggerated and impossible to verify, Israeli archaeologist Ronny Reich estimates a death toll of 60,000 before the Persian authorities stopped the killing.According to the eyewitness account of Strategius of St. Sabas, "Jews ransomed the Christians from the hands of the Persian soldiers for good money, and slaughtered them with great joy at Mamilla Pool, and it ran with blood." The Sulha al-Quds, the treaty of Jerusalem's capitulation to Muslim forces in 638, in which the Christian Patriarch Sophronius of Jerusalem required that the Arab ruler Umar protect the people of Jerusalem from the Jews, can only be understood in this context.

=== Crusader period ===
During the period of Crusader rule over Jerusalem in the 12th century, Mamilla pool was known as the Patriarch's Lake, and the Pool of Hezekiah inside the city walls that it fed was known as the Pool of the Patriarch's Bath.

=== 19th century (late Ottoman period) ===
Throughout the late Ottoman period, the area around the pool was a burial ground, as attested to by the numerous Muslim tombstones.

In the 19th century, Horatio Balch Hackett wrote: "At the distance of several hundred yards we come to another pool, Birket el-Mamilla, generally supposed to be the Upper Gihon of Scripture, (Isaiah 36, 2.) This reservoir is still used, and on the ninth of April contained three or more feet of water. It is about three hundred feet long, two hundred wide, and twenty feet deep. It has steps at two of the corners, which enable the people not only to descend and fetch up water, but to lead down animals to drink. It is customary, also, to bathe here."

=== 20th century ===
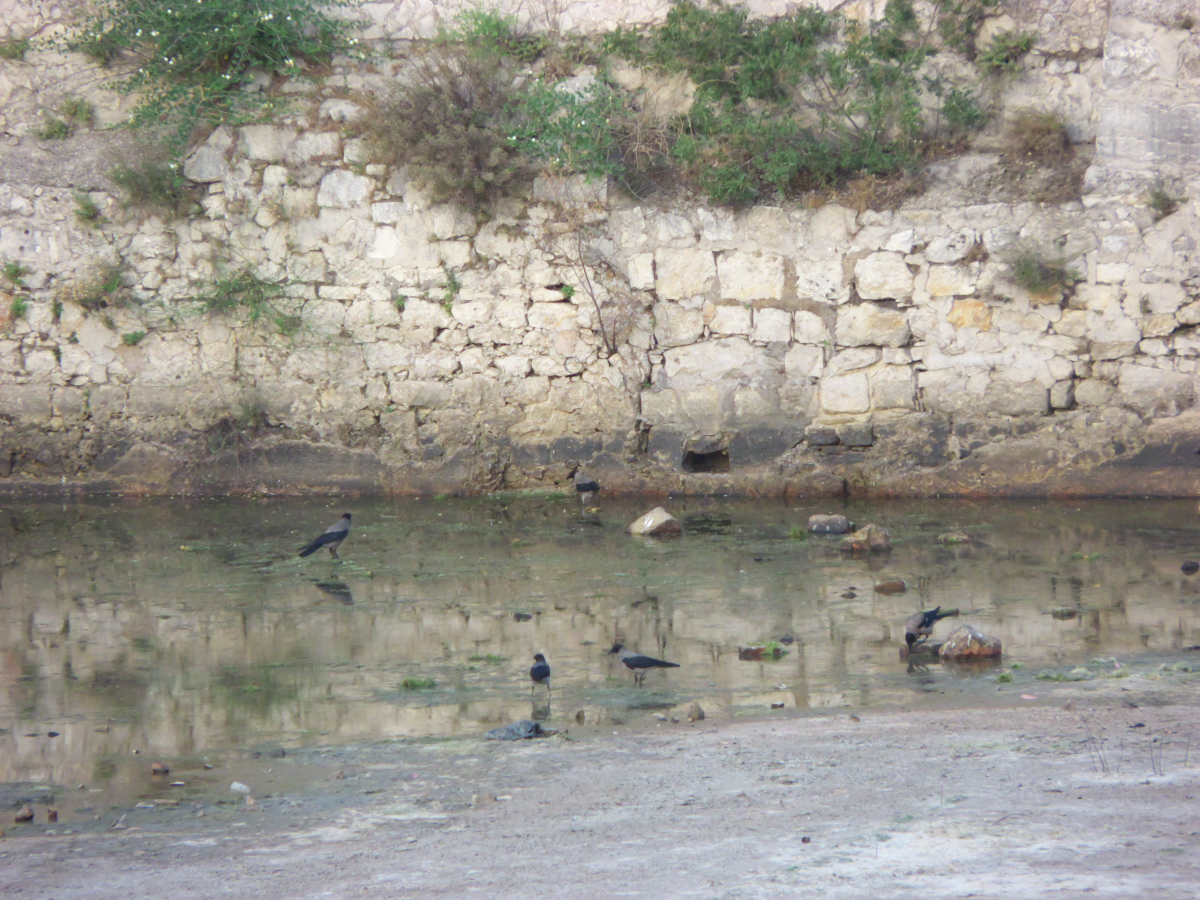
Wildlife at Mamilla pool

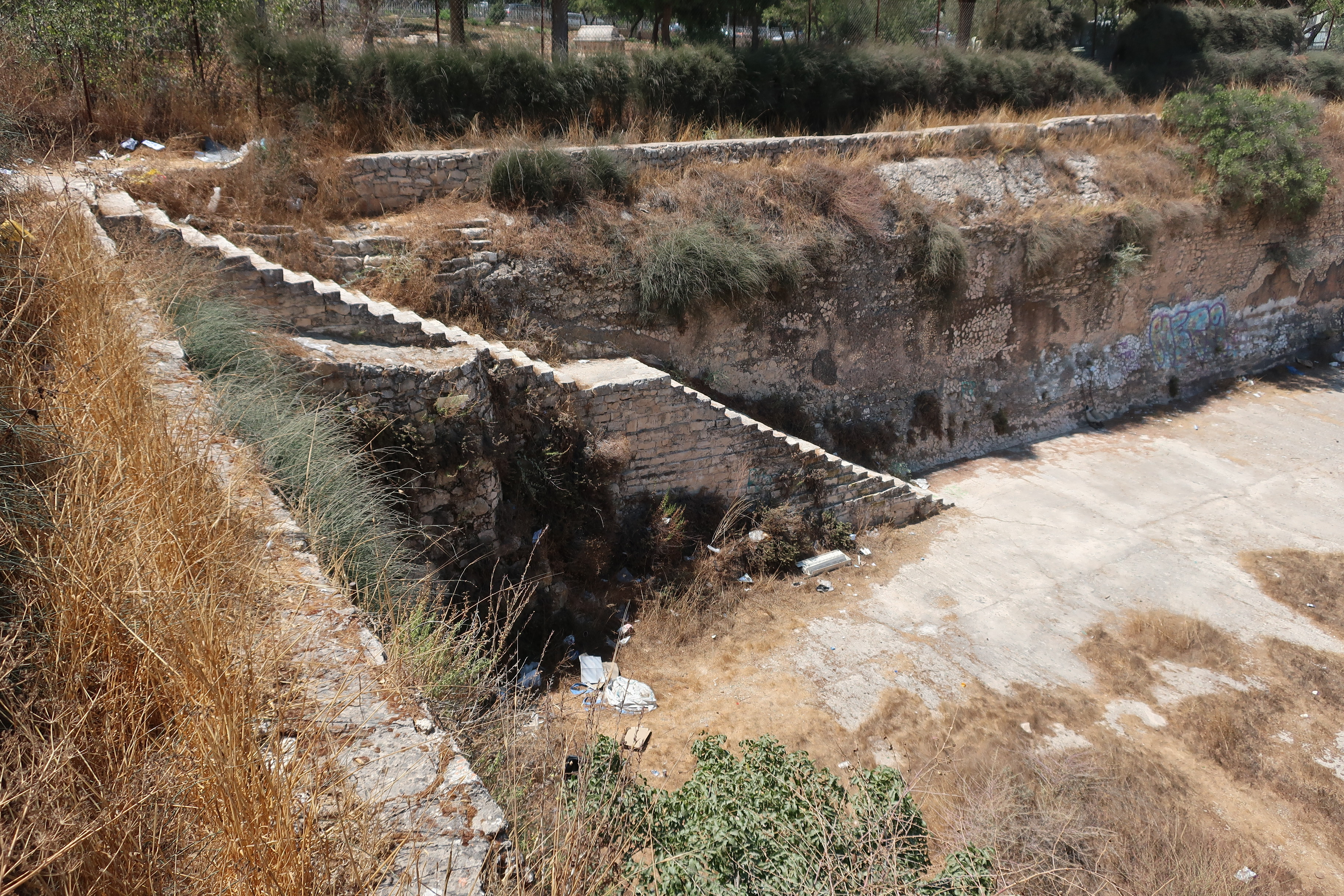
A staircase descending into Mamilla pool

In the 1940s, the British authorities poured concrete into the bottom of the pool to prevent seepage, but water eventually stopped flowing into it, and the pool fell into disuse. During the War of Independence, when Jerusalem was under siege, the collected rainwater was an important water source for local residents.

In 1948, under the Absentee Property Law, management of the site was transferred to the Religious Services Ministry. In 1958, the surrounding area became a public park. Today, the pool is Jerusalem's last remaining "winter pool" (vernal pool) filling with rainwater during the winter months.

== Dimensions ==
The pool's dimensions as recorded by Edward Robinson in the mid-19th century give a depth of 18 feet (5.5 m), a length of 316 feet (96 m), and a width of 200 feet (61 m) at its western end and 218 feet (66 m) at its eastern end. In 2008, the dimensions are given as 291 feet (89 m) x 192 feet (59 m) x 19 feet (5.8 m). Scholars have noted that a cistern at the bottom, below the lower end of a Mamilla pool, leads to a staircase that ends in a small room. There is a drainage pipe, measuring 53 cm in diameter at the exit of the pool and is later reduced to 23 cm, and which once allowed the flow of water into the city to be regulated.

== Ecosystem ==
With the first rains, the pool hosts an ecosystem of frogs, crustaceans and insects. In the spring, it becomes a haven for migrating birds.In 1997, a previously unknown species of tree frog was discovered in the pool. The researchers named their find Hyla heinzsteinitzi, in memory of Israeli marine biologist Heinz Steinitz. Hyla heinzsteinitzi is now associated with H. japonica. As of 2017, the species was assumed to be extinct.However, while renovations of the site were being discussed in 2026, two large toads of this species were found in the pool.
