= Siege of Caesarea Maritima (614) =

Part of the Byzantine–Sasanian War of 602–628

Siege of Caesarea
- Part of the Byzantine–Sasanian War of 602–628
Date	614
Location	Caesarea Maritima, Palaestina Prima, Byzantine Empire
Result	Sasanian victory
Territorial changes	The Sasanians capture Caesarea Maritima, gaining access to the Mediterranean Sea

Belligerents
Byzantine Empire	Sasanian Empire

Commanders and leaders
Unknown	Shahrbaraz

Casualties and losses
- Minimal destruction

The siege of Caesarea relates to the siege and conquest of Caesarea Maritima of the Byzantine Empire's Palaestina Prima province by the Sasanian Empire in 614 CE.

The Shah Khosrow II appointed his general Shahrbaraz to conquer the Byzantine controlled areas of the Near East. Following the victory in Antioch, Shahrbaraz conquered Caesarea Maritima, the administrative capital of the province. By this time the grand inner harbor had silted up and was useless, however the Emperor Anastasius had reconstructed the outer harbor and Caesarea remained an important maritime city, providing the Sasanian Empire with access to the Mediterranean Sea. While the Sasanian siege and occupation of Caesarea resulted in limited physical destruction, the socioeconomic effects were likely more significant. The later Arab conquest also devastated the city and it subsequently entered a period of decline.

== See also ==
- Samaritan Revolts, 484–572 CE
- List of conflicts in the Near East
