= Modestus of Jerusalem =

7th-century patriarch of Jerusalem

Saint Modestus
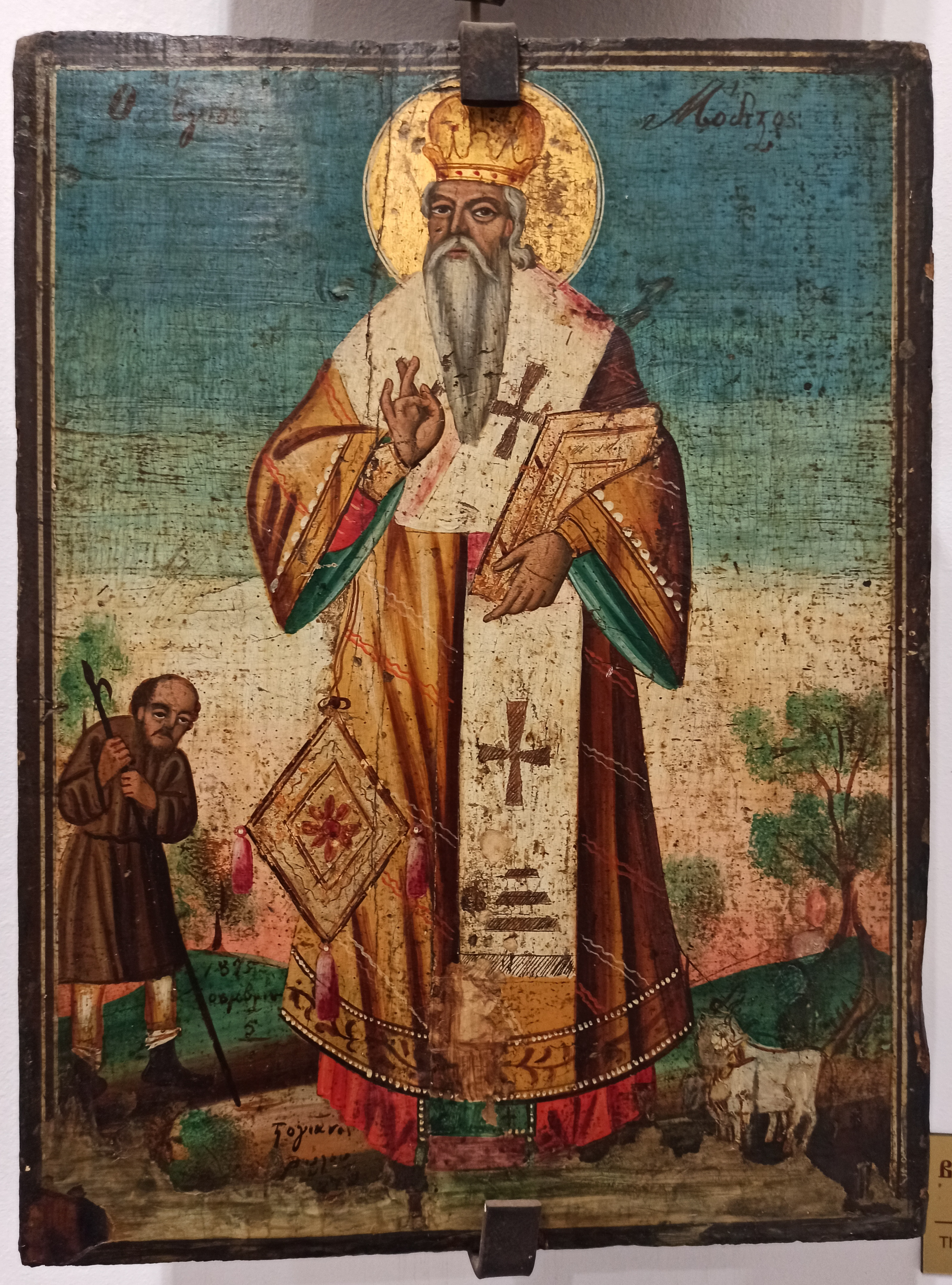

Patriarch of Jerusalem
- Born: Sebasteia, Byzantine Empire
- Died: 11 March 638 (aged 77–78); Jerusalem, Byzantine Empire
- Venerated in: Eastern Orthodox Church, Roman Catholic Church
- Feast: 17 December (Roman Catholic Church); 16 December [O.S. 29 December (where the Julian calendar is used)] 18 December [O.S. 31 December (where the Julian calendar is used)]

Modestus
- Patriarch of Jerusalem
- Installed: 632
- Term ended: 634
- Predecessor: Zacharias of Jerusalem
- Successor: Saint Sophronius

Personal details
- Denomination: Eastern Christianity

Saint Modestus of Jerusalem (Greek: Μόδεστος Ιεροσολύμων) was Patriarch of Jerusalem from 632–634.

He is commemorated as a saint by the Catholic Church on December 17, and by the Eastern Orthodox Church, on May 17, March 29 or December 16. The Palestinian-Georgian calendar venerates him on December 16 and October 19 in the Acta Sanctorum.

== Life ==
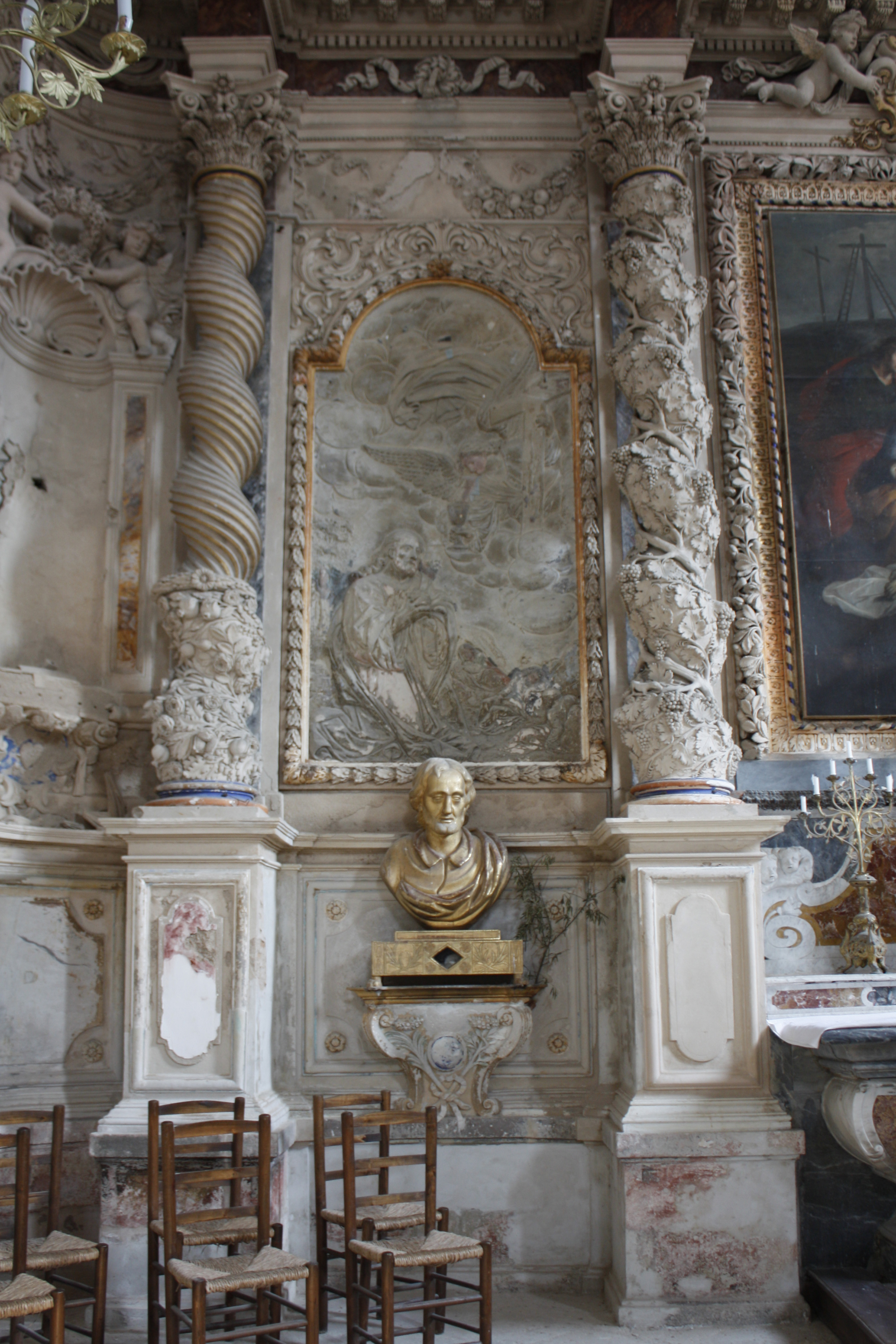
Aigues Mortes-Chapel of the Grey Penitents of Jesus to the Mount of Olives; in front of that is placed a gilded wooden reliquary bust Saint Modestus of Jerusalem

He was born in Cappadocian Sebasteia. Five months old at his Christian parents' death, he was raised as a Christian. As an adult he was sold as a slave in Egypt, but converted his pagan master to Christianity and was freed by him. Withdrawing to Mount Sinai to live as an ascetic, he was later made abbot of the Monastery of St. Theodosius in Palestine.

In 614 Chosroes II destroyed Jerusalem, killed 66,509 Christians and captured the Patriarch of Jerusalem (then Zacharias), other Christians and the True Cross. Modestus had been on his way to raise Greek troops to oppose this and was surrounded by Persian troops, having a narrow escape. Modestus was then chosen to stand in for Zacharias as Patriarch. He buried the monks killed at the monastery of Saint Sabbas the Sanctified and rebuilt the Holy Sepulchre, the city's churches and monasteries with help from John the Merciful, Patriarch of Alexandria. He became patriarch in his own right after Zacharias died in Persia when Heraclius visited the city to restore the True Cross in March 630. On Modestus's death he was buried in the Church of the Eleona on the Mount of Olives.

Preceded by Zacharias	Orthodox Patriarch of Jerusalem; 632–634	Succeeded by Sophronius I
