= Nehemiah ben Hushiel =

Leader of the Jewish revolt against the Byzantine emperor Heraclius

Nehemiah ben Hushiel (נחמיה בן חושיאל) was a leader of the Jewish revolt against Heraclius and the last Jewish leader to control Jerusalem until the state of Israel. Nehemiah ben Hushiel appears in the 7th century book Apocalypse of Zerubbabel, where he represents Messiah ben Joseph.

== Political background ==
In 590-591 CE, according to Karaite sources, the Exilarch Haninai was put to death by Khosrow II, for supporting Bahram VI. The next Exilarch (Haninais' son Bostanai) would not reign until around 640 CE. Bostanai would be the first Babylonian Exilarch under Arab rule. This would leave a fifty-year gap, where no Exilarch reigned. It is thought that after Haninai was put to death, Khosrow II suspended all forms of Jewish self-governance and created many difficulties for the rabbinical academies. By 609 CE, both of the major academies Sura and Pumbedita are known to have been holding classes and led by a Gaon.

== Account ==
Nehemiah ben Hushiel was the leader of the Jewish revolt against Heraclius.

Jacob Neusner guesses that Jews of the west supported Khosrow II against the Byzantines either not knowing or not caring about his persecution of the Exilarchs and suppression of Jews in the east. Frank Meir Loewenberg speculates that in order to gain Jewish support Khosrow II appointed an Exilarch of his choosing. Named Hushiel, this Exilarch had a son named Nehemiah - hence Nehemiah ben Hushiel. According to this guess Nehemiah was placed as the symbolic leader of the Jewish forces.

The Persian Sassanians, commanded by Shahrbaraz, were joined by Nehemiah and the wealthy Jewish leader Benjamin of Tiberias, who had mustered a force of Tiberian Jews. The combined force captured Jerusalem in 614 CE without resistance. Nehemiah was then appointed the ruler of Jerusalem. He began the work of making arrangements for the building of the Third Temple, and sorting out genealogies to establish a new High Priesthood.

After only a few months, a Christian revolt occurred. The Jews fled to Shahrbaraz's encampment at Caesarea. The Christians were able to briefly retake the city for 19 days before the walls were breached by Shahrbaraz's forces.

In 617 CE, the Persians reversed their policy and sided with the Christians, probably because of pressure from Mesopotamian Christians. It has been suggested that Nehemiah ben Hushiel was killed then. Nehemiah ben Hushiel and his "council of the righteous" were killed along with many other Jews, some throwing themselves off the city walls. However, it does not appear that Jews were violently expelled from Jerusalem as Sebeos thought. Instead, Modestos' letter seems to imply that further Jewish settlers were banned from settling in or around Jerusalem. A small synagogue on the Temple Mount was also demolished.

== Historical sources ==
=== Sebeos' account ===
The Armenian bishop and historian Sebeos wrote an account of the fall of Jerusalem. He writes that at first the inhabitants of Jerusalem voluntarily submitted to the Jews and Persians, however after a few months, the ostikan appointed by Khosrau II to rule Jerusalem was killed in a Christian revolt.

Sebeos writes that during the revolt many Jews were killed, some throwing themselves off the city walls to escape. The remaining Jews fled to the Sasanian general Shahrbaraz. Shahrbaraz assembled his troops and went and encamped around Jerusalem and besieged it for 19 days. The Christian death toll was 17,000 in addition 35,000 people including the patriarch Zacharias were deported to Mesopotamia. For three days the Persian forces slaughtered and plundered the inhabitants of the city. The city was burned down. The Jews were then driven from the city and an archpriest named Modestos was appointed over the city.

=== Sefer Zerubbabel ===
The Sefer Zerubbabel is a medieval Hebrew apocalypse written in the style of biblical visions (e.g. Daniel, Ezekiel) placed into the mouth of Zerubbabel. It is thought to have been written at least partially during the beginning of the 7th century.

In the Sefer Zerubbabel Aaron's rod, Elijah and Nehemiah ben Hushiel will be hidden in the city of Tiberias. After Nehemiah ben Hushiel takes possession of Jerusalem, he proceeds to sorts out Israel's genealogical lists according to their families. He is killed in the fifth year which would be 619 during the month of Av (July - August). The Sefer Zerubbabel states that Shiroi King of Persia will stab Nehemiah ben Hushiel and Israel. His thoroughly crushed corpse will be thrown down before the gates of Jerusalem. And sixteen of the righteous shall be killed with him. Armilus enters Jerusalem on the 14th day of the new year during the month of Nisan. Presumably, this would coincide with March 28, 628.

The Sefer Zerubbabel does not claim that Nehemiah ben Hushiel will be the Messiah ben David. Rather it asserts that he is the Messiah ben Joseph and a descendant of Joseph. The exilarchs traced their line back to David.

Kavadh II made peace with Heraclius in 628 after the reign of Khosrow II. Armilus is thought to be a cryptogram for Heraclius.

=== Poems by Eleazar ben Killir ===
Three piyyutim attributed to Eleazar ben Kalir are thought to be based on an early version of the Sefer Zerubbabel.

The first is believed to be dated between 629 and 634. In the text the Jews set up an altar and offer sacrifices, however they are not allowed to erect a sanctuary. The Jewish leader who is called the Messiah ben Joseph arises among them and within three months reaches the top. However, he is killed by the Persian chief commander in a small sanctuary shortly after.

In a second piyyut, which is undatable, the Messiah ben Joseph is named as Nehemiah ben Hushiel.

A third piyyut titled Oto ha-yom is dated later, as the Persians have been defeated by the Byzantines. However a king from Arabia then invades. This poem is thought to date from the early years of the Arab invasion. Nehemiah ben Hushiel is not mentioned. The Messiah ben David of the Sefer Zerubbabel Menahem ben Ammiel is now called the Messiah ben Joseph.

== Other texts mentioning Nehemiah ==
=== Otot ha-Mašiah (Signs of the Messiah) ===
Another medieval Hebrew apocalypse the Otot ha-Mašiah also casts Nehemiah ben Hushiel as a Messianic leader. It gives a less detailed account but is also thought to be dated to this period.

The following texts also mention Nehemiah and they are all similar to 'Otot ha-Mašiah (Signs of the Messiah). For example, Nehemiah will confront Armilos with a Torah scroll in all of them and in some cases the text is almost identical. The texts are Tefillat (Prayer of) R. Shimon b. Yohai, 'Otot of R. Shimon b. Yohai and Ten Signs

=== Pirqe Mašiah ===
The medieval Hebrew apocalypse Pirqe Mašiah also mentions Nehemiah without his surname. It was clearly written later, as it mentions Arabs controlling the Temple Mount. The Arabs say this is our sanctuary it has nothing to do with you. The Arabs agree that both will present offerings and whoever's offering is accepted, the other will follow his ways, stating that “we will become one people ummah.” Satan then denounces the Jews before God, causing the Arabs' offering to be accepted and the Jews' offering to be rejected. The Jews, however, refuse to commit apostasy. A battle erupts between the two and Nehemiah is slain, later to be resurrected

== See also ==
- Apocalypse of Zerubbabel
- Armilus
- Benjamin of Tiberias
- Byzantine–Sasanian War of 602–628
- Exilarch
- Jewish revolt against Heraclius
- Mar-Zutra III
