= Zacharias of Jerusalem =

Patriarch of the Greek Orthodox Church of Jerusalem from 609 to 632 CE

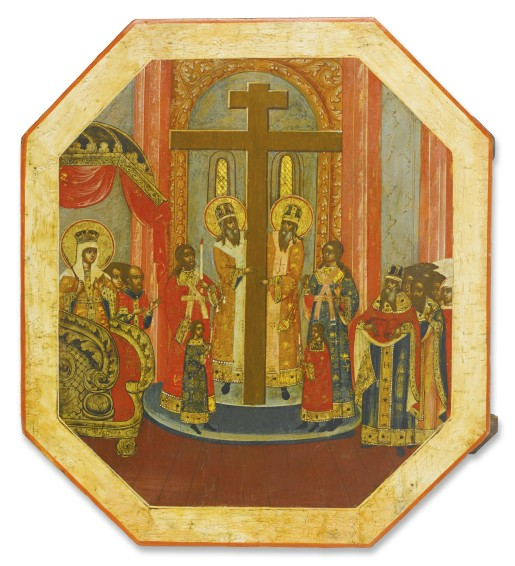
Russian icon of the Elevation of the Cross, 18th century, depicting the recovery of the cross from the Persians in 627 AD and its raising in the Temple of the Resurrection by Emperor Heraclius and Patriarch Zacharios

Zacharias of Jerusalem was the Patriarch of Jerusalem of the Church of Jerusalem from 609 to 632. Zacharias spent most of his patriarchate as a prisoner of the Sasanian Emperor Khosrow II following the Sasanian conquest of Jerusalem. He is commemorated by the Orthodox Church on February 21. He is also venerated in the Catholic Church, where he is known mostly for the sacramental called the "Plague Cross of Saint Zacharias of Jerusalem".

The early life of Zacharias is unknown. He was elected patriarch in 609. During the reign of the Byzantine emperor Heraclius, the Sasanians invaded Byzantine Syria, taking Jerusalem in 614. According to Sebeos, they seized True Cross in addition to taking tens of thousands of Christian prisoners, including Zacharias.

In 627, after rebuilding his army, Heraclius counter-attacked into Persia. Winning a decisive victory at Nineveh, Heraclius compelled the Persians to return the True Cross and the surviving captives, including Patriarch Zacharias.

Zacharias died in 632. Patriarch Modestus, who had acted as locum tenens during Zacharias's captivity succeeded him on the patriarchal throne.

== In Western Christianity ==
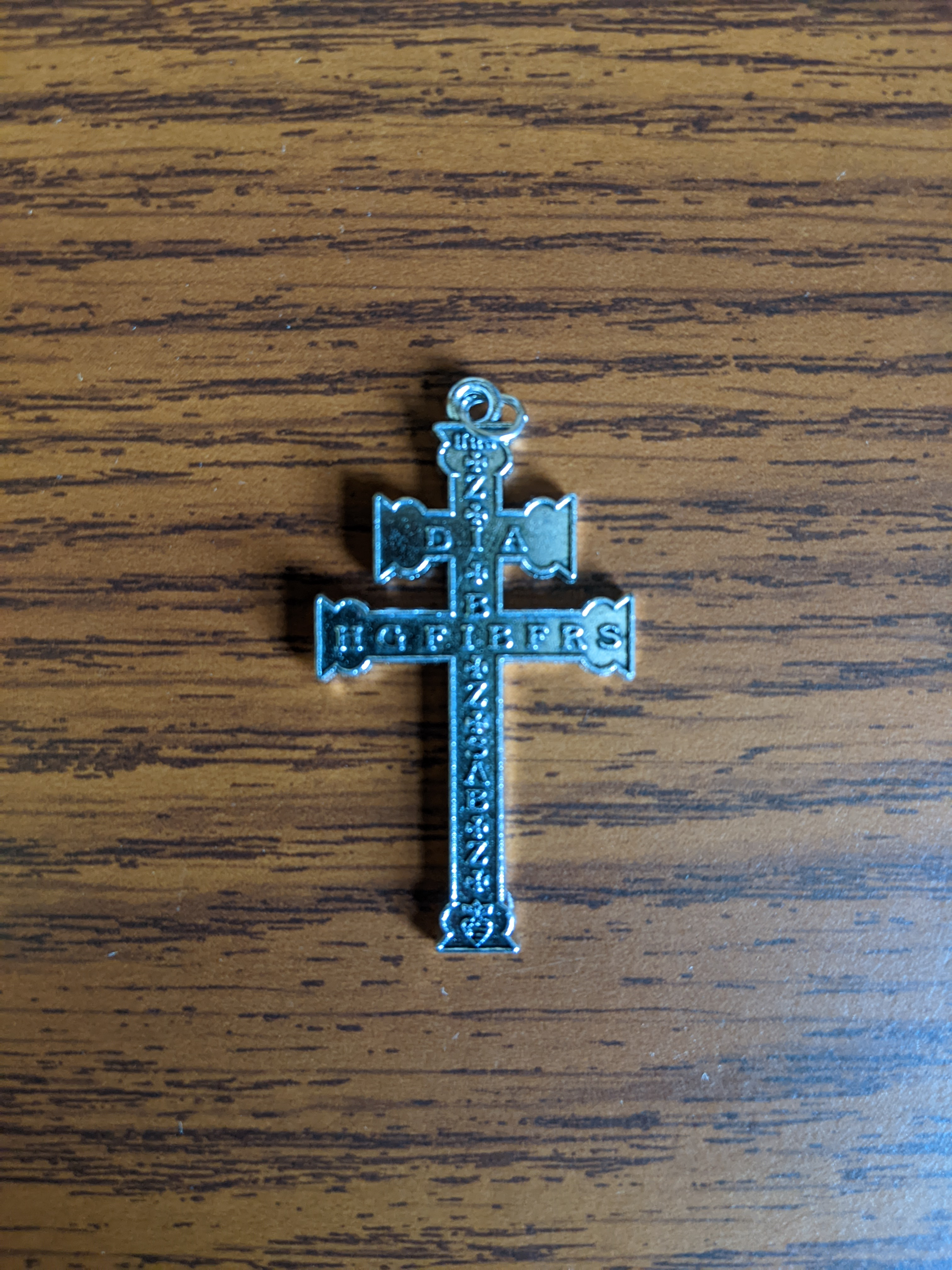
A Plague Cross sacramental, worn as a cross necklace to offer protection during plagues

The Council of Trent (1545–1563) approved a "Plague Cross of Saint Zacharias of Jerusalem" (also referred to as a plague cross), which contains an acrostic for a prayer against plagues. The prayer, attributed to St Zacharias, is said to have been useful against pestilence in the time of the saint, and the inscribed cross is said to have saved from a plague the participants at the Council of Trent. The cross, sometimes made of wood or inscribed on paper, cloth, or drawn with blessed chalk, and its associated blessing, are a sacramental used by Western Christians, and have seen a resurgence of use during times of plagues and pestilence, such as the worldwide COVID-19 pandemic in 2020–22. Plague crosses often take the form of a cross necklace (which is worn by believers) or a wall cross (which is hung on the walls of homes, hospitals, offices and churches).

Religious titles
Preceded by Isaac	Patriarch of Jerusalem; 609-632	Succeeded by Modestus
