= Palestine, Greenbrier County, West Virginia =

- Unincorporated community
- Location within West Virginia Location within the United States
- Coordinates: 37°43′56″N 80°37′45″W
- Country: United States
- State: West Virginia
- County: Greenbrier
- Elevation: 1,617 ft (493 m)
- Time zone: UTC-5 (Eastern (EST))
  - Summer (DST): UTC-4 (EDT)
- Area codes: 304 & 681
- GNIS feature ID: 1544535

Palestine is an unincorporated community in Greenbrier County, West Virginia, United States. Palestine is located along the northeast border of Alderson.
