= Palaestina Prima =

Byzantine province (390-636)

Provincia Palaestina Prima Ἐπαρχία Παλαιστίνη Πρώτη
- Province of the Diocese of the East (Byzantine Empire)
- 395–636
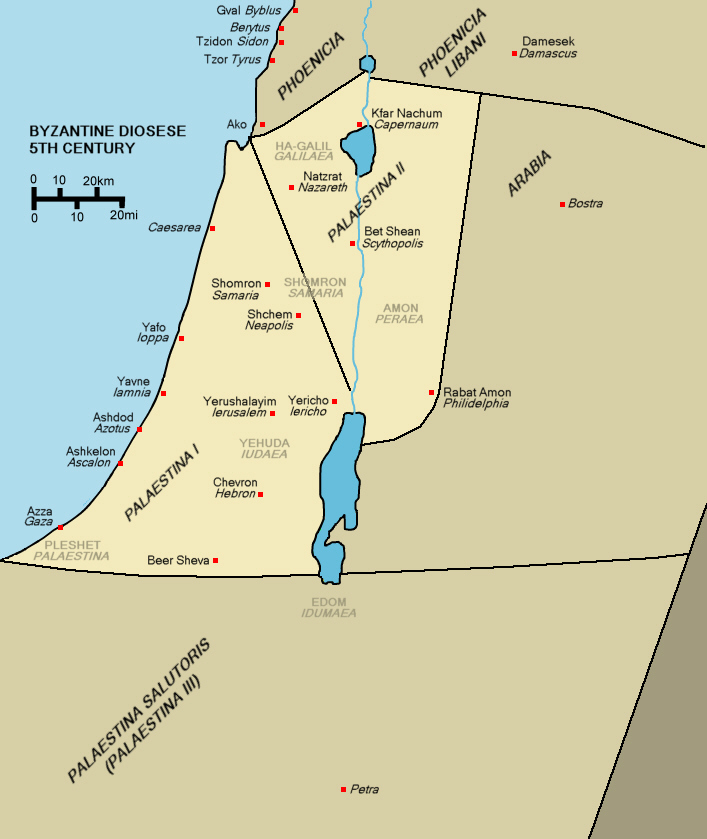
- Byzantine provinces in the 5th century
- Capital: Caesarea Maritima
- Historical era: Byzantine Palestine
  - division of the Roman Empire: 395
  - Samaritan Revolts: 484–572
  - Persian occupation and Jewish revolt: 614–628
  - Muslim conquest of Syria: 636
Preceded by	Succeeded by
Syria Palaestina	Jund Filastin
- Today part of: Israel; Jordan; Palestine

Palaestina Prima or Palaestina I was a Byzantine province that existed from the late 4th century until the Muslim conquest of the Levant in the 630s, in the region of Palestine. It included the historical regions of Judea, Samaria and the coastal plain. The province was temporarily lost to the Sassanid Empire (Persian Empire) in 614, but re-conquered in 628.

== History ==
The province of Palaestina Prima came into existence in the late 4th century through a series of reforms of the Roman provincial administration which subdivided many provinces into smaller administrative units. The intent of these reforms were to circumscribe the ability of provincial governors with strong garrisons to stage revolts and to improve efficiency by reducing the area controlled by each governor. Provinces were clustered into regional groups called dioceses. Thus, the province of Syria Palaestina and neighboring regions were organized into the provinces Palaestina Prima, Palaestina Secunda, and Palaestina Tertia or Palaestina Salutaris (First, Second, and Third Palestine). Palaestina Prima with its capital in Caesarea Maritima encompassed the central parts of Palestine, including the coastal plain, Judea, and Samaria. Palaestina Secunda had its capital in Scythopolis and included northern Transjordan, the lower Jezreel Valley, the Galilee, and the Golan area. Palaestina Tertia with its capital in Petra included the Negev, southern Transjordan, and parts of the Sinai Peninsula. These provinces became part of the Dioceses Orientis, a diocese grouping the near eastern provinces.

Despite Christian domination, until the 4th and 5th centuries Samaritans developed some autonomy in the hill country of Samaria, a move that gradually escalated into a series of open revolts. The four major Samaritan Revolts during that period caused a near extinction of the Samaritan community as well as significant Christian losses. In the late 6th century, Byzantines and their Christian Ghassanid allies took a clear upper hand in the struggle.

=== Last Great War of Antiquity ===
In 602, the final war between the Byzantine Empire and its eastern rival the Sasanid Empire (Persian Empire) broke out. In 613 the Persians invaded the Levant and the Jews revolted against the Byzantines, hoping to secure autonomy for Jerusalem. The following year Persian-Jewish forces captured Caesarea and Jerusalem, destroying its churches, massacring its Christian population, and taking the True Cross and other relics as trophies to the Persian capital Ctesiphon. The event sent shock-waves through the Christian world. Since the days of Constantine the Great, Jerusalem had been the emblematic capital of Christianity and the symbolic center of the world. The Jews gained dominance over Jerusalem, but the Persians found it more expedient to side with the Christians who constituted the overwhelming majority of the population and in 617 the Persians returned the city to them. Meanwhile, the Roman emperor Heraclius began a successful counter-offensive. By 627/8 he was advancing into the Persian heartland. The Persians sued for peace and had to return the Roman provinces they had captured and the stolen relics. In March 629, Heraclius triumphantly returned the True Cross to Jerusalem. Heraclius had promised the Jews pardon for their revolt. However, at the prompting of the Christian leadership, Heraclius went back on his promise. The Jews were expelled from Jerusalem and thousands were massacred.

Byzantine control of the province was again and irreversibly lost in 636, during the Muslim conquest of Syria.

== Demographics ==
The population of Palestine reached an all-time peak during the Byzantine era.

Greek-speaking Byzantine Christians and Samaritans dominated the central regions of Palaestina Prima, while Christian Ghassanid Arabs and Nabataean Arabs dominated Palaestina Secunda and Tertia respectively. The Samaritan revolts in the 5th and 6th centuries, and the subsequent suppression of their communities, took its toll on their numbers. Many also converted to Christianity.

According to the 6th century hagiography Life of Barsauma, about a wandering monophysite monk, the Jews together with the pagans, constituted the majority in Palestine in the 5th century. However, some historians have questioned that claim.

Depending on the time, either a notable Roman or Persian military presence would be noted.

== Religion ==
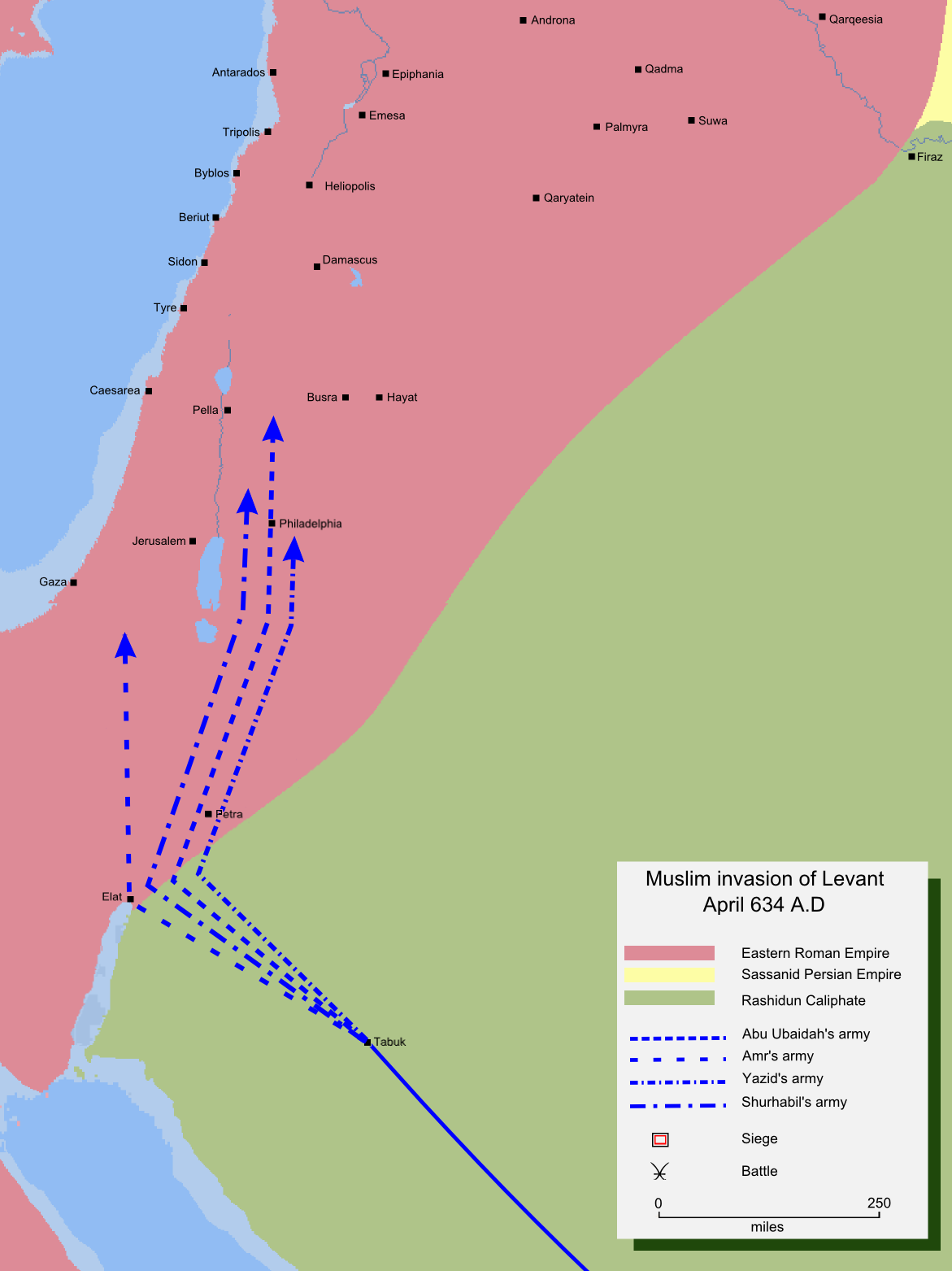
Map detailing Rashidun Caliphates invasion of Levant 634-639.

During the Byzantine period, Palestina Prima gradually became a center of Christianity, attracting numerous monks and religious scholars from the Near East and Southern Europe, and abandoning previous Roman and Hellenistic cults. Arianism and Christianity found themselves in a hostile environment as well.

Variants of the Mosaic religion were still at large from the 4th until the 6th centuries, practiced by ethnoreligious communities of Samaritans and Jews. However, with the decline of the Samaritan and Jewish populations through war, emigration and conversion during the 6th and 7th century, the religion declined as well. By the late Byzantine period, fewer synagogues could be found and many were destroyed in violent events. The city of Hebron is notable in being one of the last Jewish cities remaining (although the Cave of the Patriarchs had been converted into a Church).

== Economy ==
Written sources from the Byzantine period describe Ascalon and Gaza as important commercial hubs that exported wine to many places throughout the empire. Jerome points out that the region was home to numerous monastic settlements at the time and had a landscape dotted with vineyards. The church may have been a significant wine producer, as evidenced by archeological sites like Horvat Hesheq and Horvat Bet Loya.

== See also ==
- Coele-Syria
- Palaestina Secunda
- Palestina Salutaris
- Iudaea Province

== Sources ==
- Balfour, Alan (December 3, 2012). Solomon's Temple: Myth, Conflict, and Faith. John Wiley & Sons. pp. 112–. ISBN 978-0-470-67495-6.
- Bar, Doron (2003). "The Christianisation of Rural Palestine during Late Antiquity". The Journal of Ecclesiastical History. 54 (3): 401–421. doi:10.1017/S0022046903007309. ISSN 0022-0469.
- Drijvers, Jan Willem (2002). "Heraclius and the Restitutio Crucis: Notes on Symbolism and Ideology". In G. J. Reinink; Bernard H. Stolte (eds.). The Reign of Heraclius (610-641): Crisis and Confrontation. Peeters Publishers. pp. 175–190. ISBN 978-90-429-1228-1.
- Foss, Clive (2003). "The Persians in the Roman Near East (602–630 AD)". Journal of the Royal Asiatic Society of Great Britain & Ireland. 13 (2): 149–170. doi:10.1017/S1356186303003055. ISSN 0035-869X. S2CID 162252154.
- Gil, Moshe (1997). A History of Palestine, 634-1099. Cambridge University Press. ISBN 978-0-521-59984-9.
- Haldon, John (2002). "The Reign of Heraclius: a Context for Change?". In G. J. Reinink; Bernard H. Stolte (eds.). The Reign of Heraclius (610-641): Crisis and Confrontation. Peeters Publishers. pp. 1–16. ISBN 978-90-429-1228-1.
- Harries, Jill (2012). Imperial Rome AD 284 to 363: The New Empire. Edinburgh University Press. ISBN 978-0-7486-2052-4.
- Hughes, Ian (October 2020). A Military Life of Constantine the Great. Pen and Sword Military. ISBN 978-1-5267-2426-7.
- Lewis, Bernard (April 15, 2011). Islam in History: Ideas, People, and Events in the Middle East. Open Court. ISBN 978-0-8126-9757-5.
- Magness, Jodi (August 27, 2012). The Archaeology of the Holy Land: From the Destruction of Solomon's Temple to the Muslim Conquest. Cambridge University Press. ISBN 978-0-521-12413-3.
- Masalha, Nur (2018). Palestine: A Four Thousand Year History. Bloomsbury Academic. ISBN 978-1-78699-274-1.
- Mitchell, Stephen (June 11, 2014). A History of the Later Roman Empire, AD 284-641. Wiley. ISBN 978-1-118-34106-3.
- Reinik, Gerrit J. (2002). "Heraclius, the New Alexander: Apocalyptic Prophecies during the Reign of Heraclius". In G. J. Reinink; Bernard H. Stolte (eds.). The Reign of Heraclius (610-641): Crisis and Confrontation. Peeters Publishers. pp. 81–94. ISBN 978-90-429-1228-1.
- Schäfer, Peter (2003). The History of the Jews in the Greco-Roman World. Psychology Press. ISBN 978-0-415-30585-3.
- Shahîd, Irfan (1995). Byzantium and the Arabs in the Sixth Century, Volume 1. Washington, DC: Dumbarton Oaks. ISBN 978-0-88-402214-5.
- Shahin, Mariam (2005). Palestine: A Guide. Interlink Books. ISBN 1-56656-557-X.
- "Palestine - Roman Palestine". Encyclopedia Britannica.
