= Niketas the Persian =

Byzantine officer

- Born: Sasanian Empire
- Cause of death: Execution
- Occupations: officer, heir-apparent
- Title: patrikios
- Father: Shahrbaraz
- Relatives: Nike (sister)

Niketas was a 7th-century Sasanian Persian officer. He was the son and heir of the Sasanian Persian general and briefly shahanshah, Shahrbaraz.

== Biography ==
Niketas was the son of Shahrbaraz, a famous Persian general who had led Sasanian armies in Syria, Anatolia, and Egypt during the Byzantine–Sassanid War of 602–628. After the war ended, Shahrbaraz remained in control of Egypt and the Levant lands, until in end 628 he handed them back to the Byzantine emperor Heraclius in exchange for Byzantine support in his own bid for the Persian throne. To conclude the pact, Niketas, who was recognized as Shahrbaraz' heir by Heraclius, was given the Byzantine rank of patrikios, while his sister Nike was married to Theodosios, one of Heraclius' sons. Niketas and another of his brothers came to live in the Byzantine court, practically as hostages. As a token of their alliance, in summer/early autumn 629, Niketas returned the Christian relics of the Holy Sponge and the Holy Lance to Heraclius from Jerusalem, then still under control of Shahrbaraz's Persian troops. It is probable that at this time, Niketas converted to Christianity; as he was his father's heir-apparent, this opened the prospect of the Christianization of Persia should Shahrbaraz be able to maintain his power there.

Following his father's murder, Niketas remained in Byzantine service, and re-appears in 636 as one of the many Byzantine commanders during the Battle of Yarmouk against the Muslim Arabs, although which army he led is unknown. He survived the Byzantine defeat at Yarmouk and fled to Emesa, from where he contacted the Caliph Umar. Niketas allegedly offered to help the Arabs conquer Persia, but Umar distrusted him and had him executed.

== Sources ==
- Kaegi, Walter Emil (2003). Heraclius: emperor of Byzantium. Cambridge University Press. ISBN 0-521-81459-6.
- Martindale, John R., ed. (1992). The Prosopography of the Later Roman Empire: Volume III, AD 527–641. Cambridge: Cambridge University Press. ISBN 0-521-20160-8.
