= Timeline of Hebron =

The following is a timeline of the history of the city of Hebron, West Bank, Palestine.

== Prior to 20th century ==
- 990 BCE - Capital of David of Israel relocated from Hebron to Jerusalem (approximate date).
- 164 BCE - Hebron sacked by forces of Judas Maccabeus.
- 638 - Hebron taken by Muslim forces.
- 1168 - Hebron taken by crusaders.
- 1170 - Traveler Benjamin of Tudela visits city.
- 1187 - Saladin in power.
- 1270 - Sheikh Ali al-Bakka Mosque construction begins.
- 1320 - Al-Jawali Mosque built.
- 1326 - Traveler Ibn Battuta visits city.
- 1517
  - 1517 Hebron pogrom.
  - Ottomans in power.
- 1540 - Abraham Avinu Synagogue built.
- 1834 - Hebron sacked by Egyptian forces.
- 1900 - Population: About 10,000.

== 20th century ==
- 1922
  - Hebron becomes part of the British Mandate of Palestine.
  - Population: 16,500.
- 1925 - Abraham's Oak Holy Trinity Monastery consecrated.
- 1929 - 24 August: 1929 Hebron massacre.
- 1943 - Shabab Al-Khalil SC (football team) formed.
- 1948
  - British Mandate of Palestine ends.
  - Transjordan forces in power.

=== 1960s – 1990s ===
- 1965 - Palestine Red Crescent Society branch established.
- 1966 - Hebron the lamb is found in Tel Rumeida.
- 1967 - June: Israeli occupation begins; Israeli Military Governorate established.
- 1968 - Kiryat Arba Israeli settlement founded near city.
- 1971 - Hebron University established.
- 1976
  - 12 April: 1976 West Bank local elections held.
  - Fahd Qawasmeh becomes mayor.
- 1978 - Palestine Polytechnic University established.
- July 1983
  - City council and mayor Mustafa Natshe ousted.
  - 1983 Hebron University attack by the Jewish Underground
- 1994
  - 25 February: Ibrahimi Mosque massacre.
  - 8 May: Temporary International Presence in Hebron begins.
  - Al-Shuhada Street closed to Palestinians.
  - Palestinian Child Arts Center founded.
- 1996 - 20 January: 1996 Palestinian general election.
- 1997
  - 16 January: Protocol Concerning the Redeployment in Hebron effected.
  - Population: 119,801 (119,401 Palestinians + 400 Jewish settlers).

== 21st century ==
- 2003 - Population: 154,714.
- 2007
  - Khaled Osaily becomes mayor.
  - Abraham Path established.
  - Jewish settlers occupy Rajabi House in H2.
- 2012
  - October: Municipal election held.
  - Youth Against Settlements active (approximate date).
- 2017 - Old Town of Hebron designated an UNESCO World Heritage Site.
- 2018 - Population: 199,319 (estimate).

== See also ==
- Hebron history (ar)
- Timeline of the history of the region of Palestine
- Timeline of Jerusalem

== Bibliography ==
- Josiah Conder (1830), "(Hebron)", Palestine, The Modern Traveller, London: J.Duncan
- "Hebron", Handbook for Travellers in Syria and Palestine, London: J. Murray, 1868, hdl:2027/uc1.b000916684
- Èmile Isambert (1881). "Hebron". Itinéraire descriptif, historique et archéologique de l'Orient. Guides Joanne (in French). Vol. 3: Syrie, Palestine. Hachette. hdl:2027/nyp.33433002689614.
- M. Franco (1907), "Hebron", Jewish Encyclopedia, vol. 6, New York
- Sévérien Salaville (1910). "Hebron". Catholic Encyclopedia. New York.
- Macalister, Robert Alexander Stewart (1910). "Hebron" . Encyclopædia Britannica. Vol. 13 (11th ed.). pp. 192–193.
- "Hebron", Palestine and Syria (5th ed.), Leipsig: Karl Baedeker, 1912, hdl:2027/njp.32101064638636
- Noelle Watson, ed. (1996), "Hebron (West Bank)", International Dictionary of Historic Places, Fitzroy Dearborn, p. 336+, ISBN 9781884964039
- Philip Mattar, ed. (2005). "Hebron". Encyclopedia of the Palestinians. Facts on File. p. 201+. ISBN 978-0-8160-6986-6.
- Josef W. Meri, ed. (2006). "Hebron". Medieval Islamic Civilization. Routledge. p. 318. ISBN 978-0-415-96691-7.
- Bruce E. Stanley; Michael R.T. Dumper, eds. (2008), "Hebron", Cities of the Middle East and North Africa, Santa Barbara, USA: ABC-CLIO, p. 164+, ISBN 9781576079201
- Spencer C. Tucker, ed. (2008). "Hebron". Encyclopedia of the Arab-Israeli Conflict. USA: ABC-CLIO. p. 436. ISBN 9781851098422.
- Edward Platt (2012). "Timeline". City of Abraham: History, Myth and Memory: A Journey through Hebron. Picador. ISBN 978-1-4472-1330-7.
- Menachem Klein (2014). Lives in Common: Arabs and Jews in Jerusalem, Jaffa and Hebron. Oxford University Press. ISBN 978-0-19-025746-0.
