= Benjamin Rivlin =

19th-century Lithuanian rabbi, student of the Vilna Gaon

- Born: 1728; Shklow
- Died: 1812 (aged 83–84); Mogilov
- Notable work: Gevi'ei Gevia Hakesef

Rabbi Binyamin Rivlin (Riveles) of Shklow (5488 - 5573, 1727/8 - 1812) was a student of the Vilna Gaon. His father's name was Shlomo Zalman. According to family tradition, he was the central figure in the Aliyah to Israel of the Vilna Gaon's students. According to that same tradition, after his death, his son, Rabbi Hillel Rivlin of Shklow, the purported author of "Kol HaTor" succeeded him.

== Biography ==
Rivlin's father was Rabbi Shlomo Zalman Rivlin. He was known from a young age as a talented Torah scholar and an excellent student. He also studied languages, mineralogy, zoology and botany. Later, with his relative Rabbi Yehoshua Zeitlin, he established a pharmacy in Shklow. His business flourished, and he later opened branches in Mogilev, Minsk, Vitebsk and Turkey. He was accustomed to not eat meat or drink wine even on Jewish holidays, and would eat only fruit, seeds and occasionally fish and potatoes dipped in olive oil, and he would drink coffee without milk or honey.

In 1772, along with Rabbi Yehoshua Zeitlin, he established the Yeshiva of Elites in Shklow. The Vilna Gaon attended the opening of the yeshiva. The yeshiva was funded by the Rivlin-Zeitlin pharmacies, and was later supported by wealthy people of Shklow. In addition to learning Talmud and Poskim, students in this yeshiva also learned Tanach according to the tradition of the Vilna Gaon, Hebrew language and grammar, and Rivlin taught them medicine. Rivlin also gave a lesson once a month to workers. Rivlin's activism led to the wider development of Shklow, and many printing presses were opened there (until they were closed down by the government). It was written about Rivlin that "The city of Shklow and its sages were built by him."

In their introduction to their father's commentary on Shulchan Aruch, the children of the Vilna Gaon wrote about Rivlin:

He merited to hear teachings from the holy, pure mouth, and the light of the Torah and its fear shone upon him. He held firm to his ways and his customs.

== Aliya of the Vilna Gaon's students ==
According to a family tradition, influenced by the Vilna Gaon, from the year 1780 and onwards, there was a great sense of imminent redemption and return to the land of Israel. This movement received financial support from Rivlin, who (according to family tradition), along with his partner, Zeitlin, earned a large sum of money at that time through the sale of a forest to the Russian government. On the second day of Rosh Hashanah, 1781, after reading the haftara from Jeremiah (chapter 31), Rivlin gave a sermon entitled, "I awakened in the north and came from the south." In this sermon, he outlined several strategic goals to advance the redemption, including purchasing land in Israel and settling the Old City of Jerusalem.

Similar sermons were given in Jewish towns through Russia, Poland and Lithuania, and in that year, the "Chazon Zion" organization was founded (after the Vilna Gaon rejected the name "Shivat Zion") to facilitate aliyah. They established a charitable fund that would support those emigrating to Israel and for purchasing land in Jerusalem. The money was referred to colloquially as "Rivles's coins."

Of the Vilna Gaon's students, Rabbi Azriel of Shklow was sent to learn the laws of emigrating and settling the land. Rivlin also planned to emigrate to Israel, but news of plagues sweeping the Holy Land and difficulty in transferring money caused him to remain in Shklow.

In 1812, Towards the end of his life, as Napoleon marched on Russia, Rivlin moved to a nearby town. After Napoleon's defeat, he proclaimed his relief and support for the Tsar. He then set off with a group of students of the Vilna Gaon heading for Israel, but he died in the city of Mogilev that same year. Others say he died in 1813.

Due to his efforts in promoting emigration of the Vilna Gaon's students to Israel, he was known as "The chief agent of the Vilna Gaon."
