= Jericho bus firebombing =

1988 Palestinian terrorist attack in Jericho, West Bank

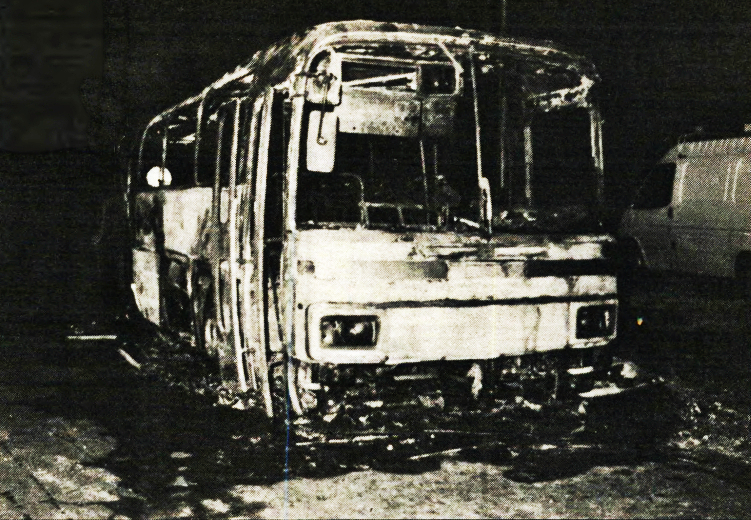
- Charred bus remains
- Native name: הפיגוע בקו 961
- Location: Near Jericho, on Highway 90, West Bank
- Date: October 30, 1988; 38 years ago c. 19:45 pm (UTC+2)
- Attack type: Ambush, firebombing
- Weapon: 3 molotov cocktails
- Deaths: 5 Israelis (including 3 children)
- Injuries: 5 Israelis
- Perpetrator: Palestinian youths
- No. of participants: 3

The Jericho bus firebombing was a Palestinian terrorist attack that occurred during the First Intifada outside the West Bank town of Jericho. In the attack, a bus was targeted by militants wielding molotov cocktails, and destroyed. It resulted in the deaths of 5 Israelis, and the wounding of 5 others.

Two assailants were arrested immediately, and imprisoned by Israel. They were released after 25 years as part of the renewal of peace negotiations with the Palestinian National Authority.

== Incident ==
On October 30, 1988, two Palestinian youths from the same extended family, Mahmud Salim Suliman Abu Khraesh of Jericho and Jum'a Ibrahim Juma Adam of Ramallah, were playing a game of cards at a café in Jericho, when one suggested to the other, "Let's throw another molotov cocktail." The youths had been jailed previously for attempted firebombing.

Later that evening, an Egged bus No. 961, connecting Tiberias and Jerusalem via the Jordan Valley, was making its way along Highway 90 with 22 passengers aboard. Among the passengers on the bus were Rabbi Eliezer Mordechai Weiss, his 26-year-old wife Rachel, a second-grade teacher in Tiberias, and their sons Netanel, 3, Rephael, 2, and Ephraim, 9 1/2 months, who were on their way to a family affair in Jerusalem. Rachel was a 10th-generation Jerusalemite, and one of 18 children born to Yitzchak Shlomo Zilberman, founder of Yeshivat Aderet Eliyahu. They originally had been sitting together in the front of the bus, but Rachel and the children moved to the back in order not to disturb her husband's Torah study.

An Israeli military jeep passed by first, but it was not targeted. As the bus approached Jericho, the attackers appeared out of a banana grove, and forced the bus to slow down. They hurled 3 molotov cocktails at it, setting the bus alight. Most of the passengers reacted quickly, and were able to escape the burning bus unharmed. But as the flames began to spread inside the bus, Rachel Weiss went into shock, then threw herself on her children in a vain attempt to keep them alive. Israel Defence Forces (IDF) corporal David Delarosa, a passenger who had exited the bus, noticed Weiss sitting near the back door, and begged her to come out, but she refused. When he tried to pull her out, he heard her say Shema Yisrael, and he understood that she wished to remain with her children. Weiss perished along with her 3 children. Delarosa died a month and a half later from burns and smoke inhalation.

Among the wounded were Dov Bloom, 35, and Sandy, 33, a couple from kibbutz Ma'ale Gilboa, who had made aliyah from Pittsburgh 9 years earlier.

Weiss and her sons were buried the following day in the Mount of Olives Jewish Cemetery. The Israeli settlement of Rehelim was subsequently named after Weiss.

== Response ==
Israel reacted swiftly to the attack, clamping a curfew on Jericho, and rounded up dozens of suspects for questioning. By the end of the day, the two Palestinians had confessed to engineering the attack. Adam was immediately arrested, and Abu Khraesh was taken into custody on November 3. Their homes were demolished by security forces. Before dawn the next day, a bulldozer began ripping out the groves of banana, orange, and date trees the attackers had used as cover. A few hours later, hundreds of trees had been uprooted.

== Aftermath ==
The attack, which occurred one day before the November 1 elections to the 12th Israeli Knesset, galvanized Israelis, and influenced their voting. The result was the re-election of a right-leaning Likud party coalition.

== Prisoner release ==
On December 30, 2013, Israel released Abu Khraesh from prison, along with some 77 others, who were part of a group of 104 prisoners in Israeli prisons whose crimes were committed prior to the Oslo Accords. The release was part of a deal in the resumption of long-stalled peace negotiations between Israel and the Palestinian National Authority.

Adam was in the last batch of Palestinian prisoners to be released. However, Israel reneged, saying that the Palestinians also did not live up to their commitments under the framework. Adam and 28 others remain in Israeli prisons.
