= Zilberman Method =

System to teach the Torah

The Zilberman Method is a system of teaching the Torah to young students, pioneered by Jerusalem rabbi Yitzchak Shlomo Zilberman, that emphasizes rote learning of the text, while leaving the more advanced study of Talmud to older students. Schools employing the method are colloquially referred to as Zilberman Schools.

== Theory ==
The Zilberman Method draws upon traditional teaching methods as outlined by Chazal and championed by The Maharal and the Vilna Gaon. The Mishnah and the Talmud set forth halakhic guidelines for the ages at which texts should be studied: "Five years old [is the age to begin studying] Scripture; a ten year-old [learns] the Mishnah; a thirteen year-old for the mitzvot ([obligation of the] commandments); a fifteen year-old [for the study] of Talmud..." and the manner of teaching (safi lei k'tura –stuffing the children like oxen; ligmar inish v'hadar lisbor – read the text and then explain it.

The Zilberman method has children focus exclusively on Tanakh and Mishnah in their younger years, ensuring that they know large portions of both areas by heart before they begin studying Talmud. Two key elements in Zilberman's methodology are review and student participation.

In the Zilberman-styled school, a new text of Chumash (Scripture) is introduced in the following manner. On Monday and Tuesday, the teacher chants the text with the tropp (ta'amei ha'mikra) and the students immediately imitate him. This is repeated several times until the students are able to read the text independently. Then the teacher introduces the translation/explanation of the text and invites students to participate in the process. New words typically need to be translated only once; subsequently, students are encouraged to call out the translation on their own. All translations are strictly literal. If the translation does not automatically yield a comprehensible meaning, the students are invited to try to find one. The class spends the rest of the week reviewing the material. Each pasuk is repeated with cantillation at least twenty-four times. Adjustments are made for each grade level.

== Examples ==
In Shabbat 63a it states, "A man should recite, and only later expound." This is in contrast to standard procedure in the Torah world, where intense scrutiny of the text at a relatively young age is favoured over the covering and committing to memory of vast amounts of material. Zilberman also instituted that school sessions be continued on Shabbat and Jewish holidays, albeit at a reduced schedule.

=== Other practices ===
Rabbi Zilberman kept the practice of donning his tefillin all day, and so encouraged his students. In normative practice, the tefillin are removed after Shacharit. Zilberman promotes the use of tekhelet in tzitzit. He encouraged his students to get married young, because it states in Pirkei Avot "An 18 year-old [enters] the chuppah (wedding canopy)".

== History ==
Proponents of the Zilberman Method argue that it is not a new innovation, but rather a return to an ancient form of Torah study elucidated in the Mishna and Talmud, and favoured by both the Maharal and the Vilna Gaon.

Zilberman found the existing Jerusalem heders' curriculum not suitable for his own children, so he began to teach them at home according to his method. In the beginning of the 1980s, after years of limited success with incorporating his teaching style in existing institutions, Zilberman founded, with the help of his sons, a school in the northern part of the Jewish Quarter of Jerusalem. The school, Yeshivat Aderet Eliyahu – also known as "Zilberman's Cheder" – adopted its founder's method, and became an inspiration for many of his students, who later branched out all over Israel founding schools with the same teaching approach.

Zilberman's life work was favored by rabbi Shlomo Zalman Auerbach and the Tchebiner Rav.

=== Schools using the Zilberman Method ===
In addition to Yeshivat Aderet Eliyahu, numerous other schools throughout Israel adhere to Zilberman Method principles, including Talmud Torah Yishrei Lev and the Zichru schools.
