= Galicia Courtyard =

Building compllex in Jerusalem

- חצר גליציה
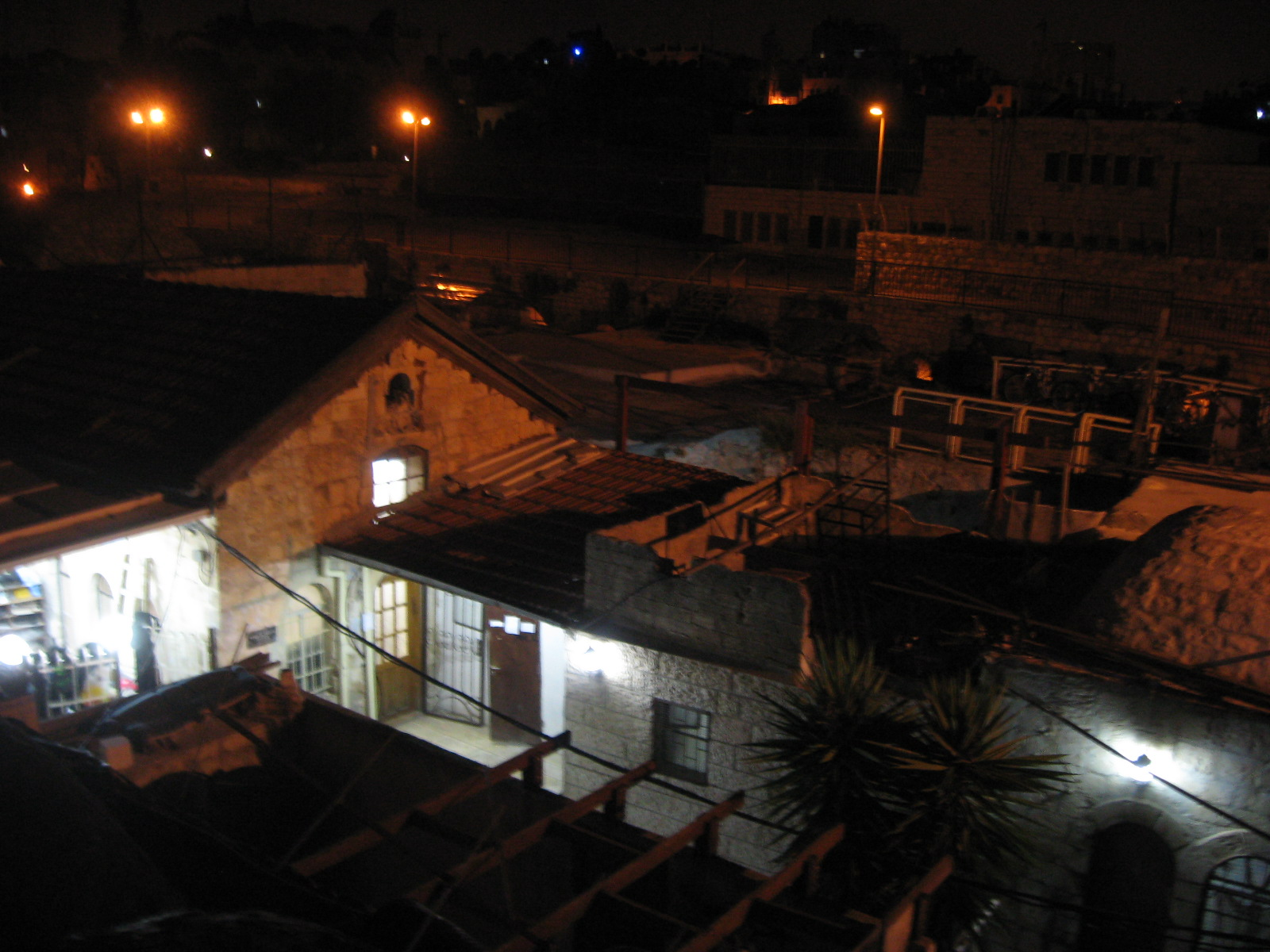
- Galicia Courtyard at night

General information
- Town or city: Muslim Quarter, Jerusalem
- Owner: Yitzchak Shlomo Zilberman

The Galicia Courtyard is a complex of several houses and yeshivas located on the rooftop level of the market in the Muslim Quarter of Jerusalem. It is adjacent to the Jewish Quarter above Chabad Street and west of the Reisin Courtyard. It is part of a larger complex that included dozens of apartments and two synagogues inhabited by Jews until 1936. It belonged partly to Yaakov Hirschensohn, father of Chaim Hirschensohn, and partly to Kollel Galicia. Today, four Jewish families live on the outskirts of the compound and their Yeshivat Aderet Eliyahu is located in the court's Excellent Zion Synagogue

== History ==
The court was originally purchased in partnership by Mordechai Yaffe and Yaakov Hirschensohn. Following Yaffe's death in 1841, Hirschensohn sold his shares to the heirs of Yaffe, who agreed to allow him to operate in the court. The land was eventually sold to Shmuel Moshe of Belzov, along with disagreements over who in the community had rights to the land. Belzov and his wife Tzipora were Galician immigrants to Israel, who dedicated their courtyard to Hasidim of the Austro-Hungarian Empire.

Around the year 1886, the Excellent Zion synagogue was established by Galician immigrants. The construction was carried out with funds provided by the Belzov family, and was burned to the ground by rioters in 1936. In 1869, the wife of Yaakov Hirschensohn, Sara Beila, established one of the city's first playgrounds behind the court, becoming a popular playspot for the local children.

=== Post-1967 ===
In 1979, more than a decade after the Six-Day War and the reunification of Jerusalem, the Atarah L'Yoshnah non-profit organisation was established. In 1981, the organisation received permission from the state to restore the courtyard. In 1988, Yitzchak Shlomo Zilberman and his sons gained possession of the courtyard from the organisation, and their family began to restore the courtyard. After its restoration, they moved their Yeshivat Aderet Eliyahu to the location. They are one of the Jewish families that currently occupy the courtyard. As of 2007, the Company for the Reconstruction and Development of the Jewish Quarter sought to build a "rooftop promenade" that includes the Galicia Courtyard to connect the Jewish and Muslim Quarters.

== Gallery ==
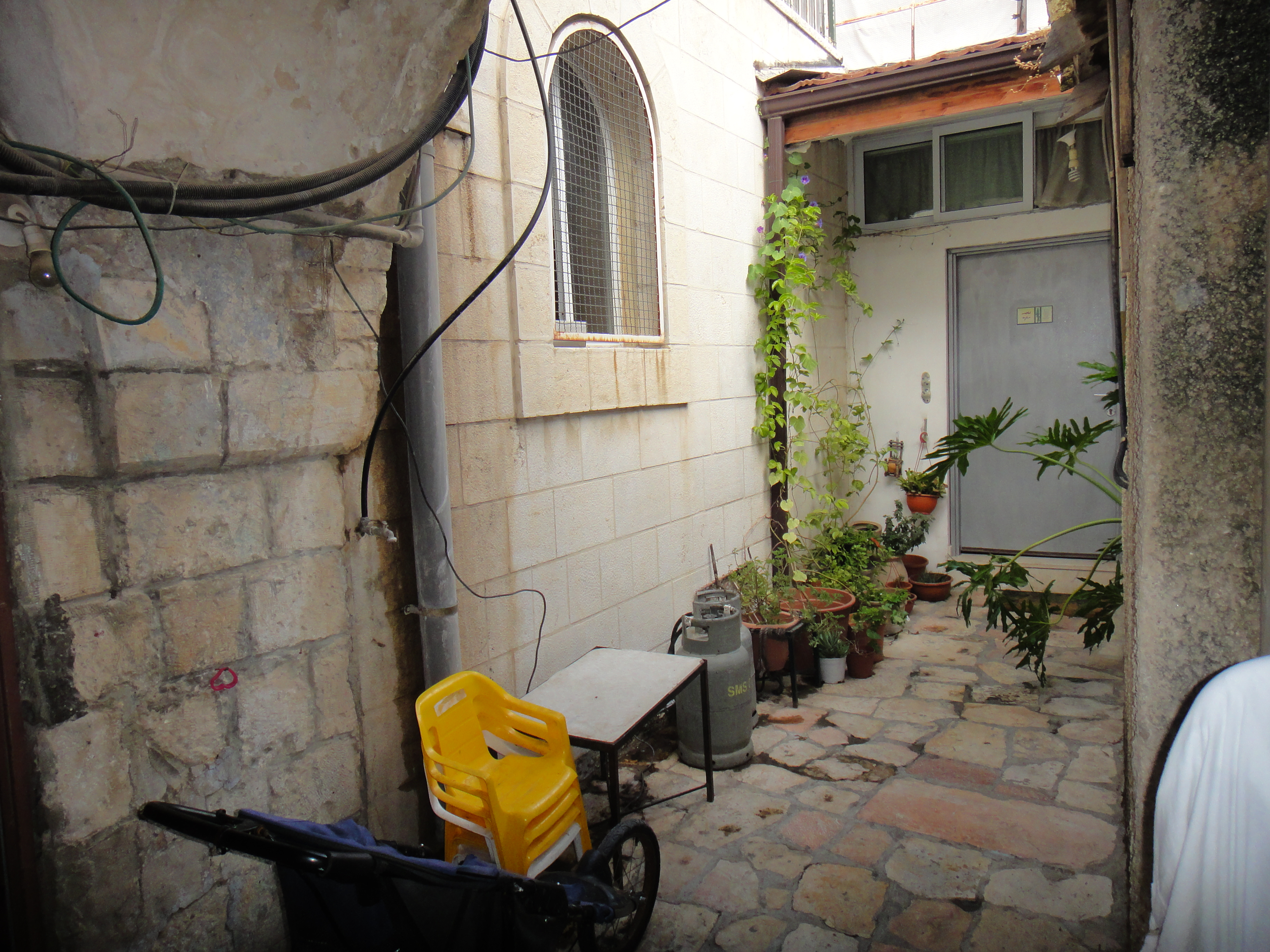
View of alley in the courtyard

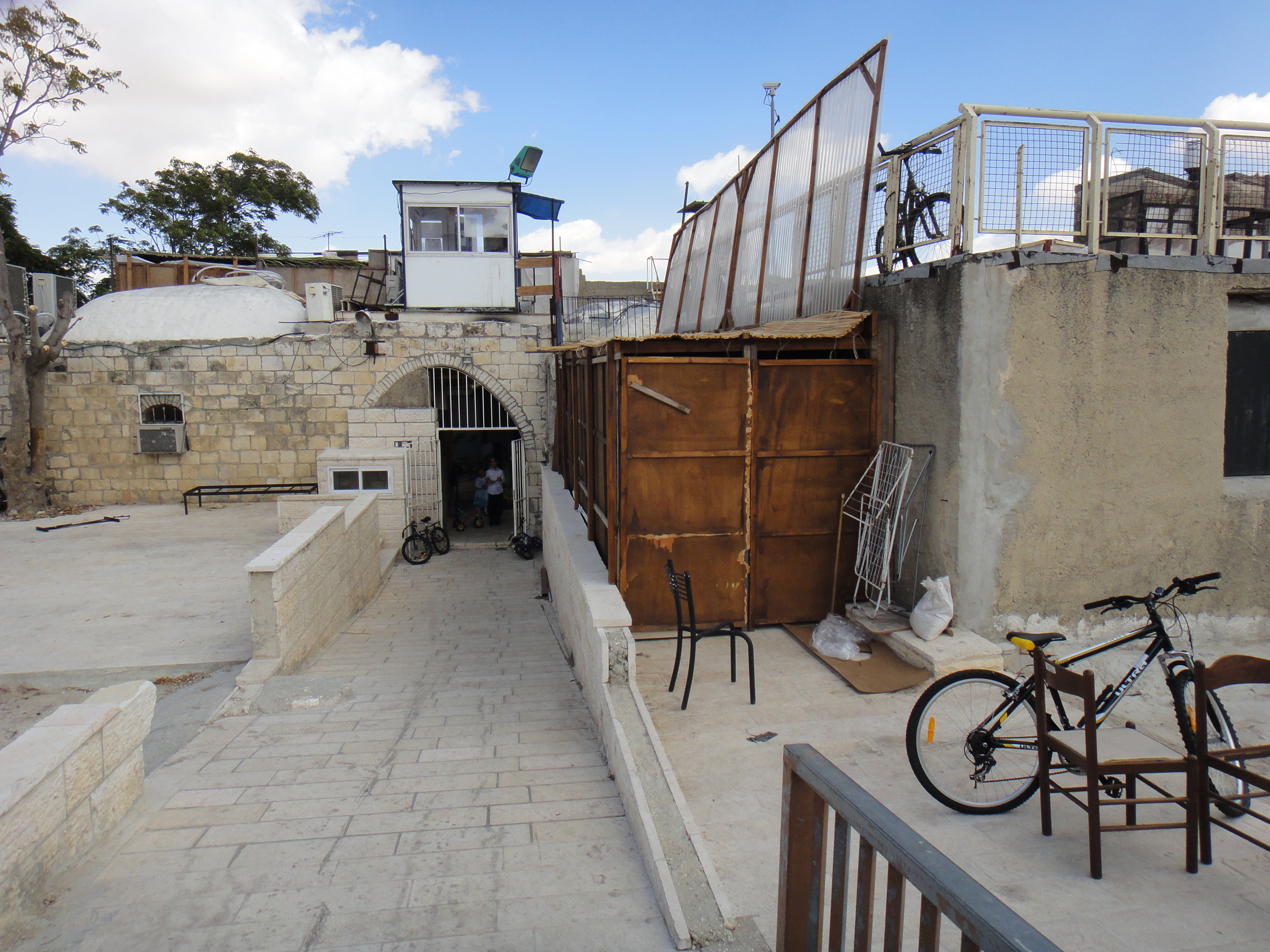
Rooftop view

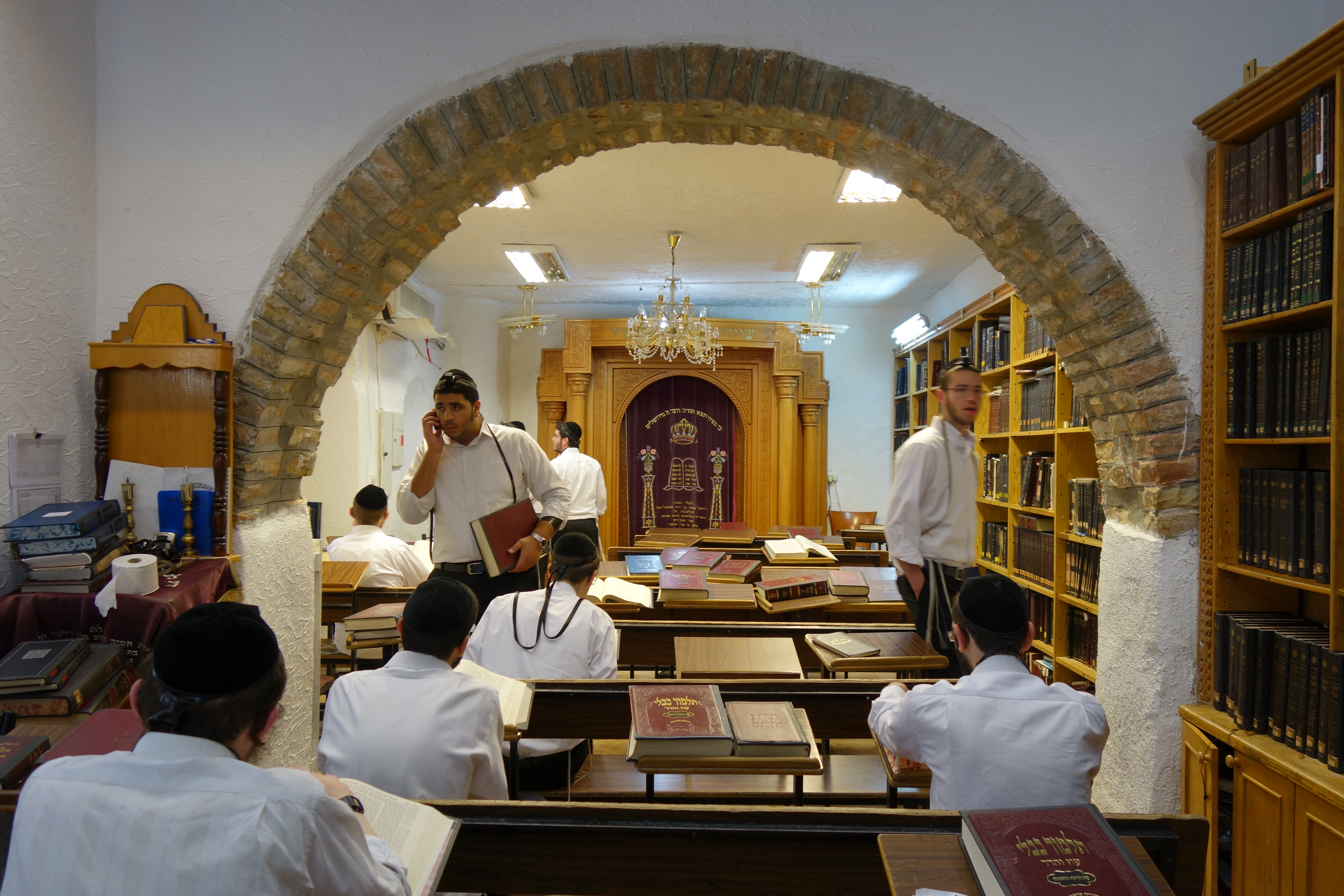
Interior of the Kollel (Attribution: Michael Jacobson)
