= Kerem Navot =

Kerem Navot's logo

Kerem Navot (Hebrew: כרם נבות, "Naboth's Vineyard") is a small Israeli NGO that monitors settlement construction in the West Bank. It was established in 2012 by Dror Etkes, who previously did similar work at Peace Now. The group's primary activity is to publish reports on Israel's land practices in the area.

== Activities ==
The group has collaborated on reports with Peace Now, B'Tselem, and Human Rights Watch. A Kerem Navot/Human Rights Watch report played a role in Airbnb's 2018 decision (reversed six months later) to bar listings located in settlements.

The group was sued for defamation by Zvi Bar Yosef, a settler whom it accused of violence in a 2020 Facebook post. Bar Yosef won the suit, but lost on appeal in 2025 after he failed to appear in court.

== Staff and funding ==
According to Guidestar, Kerem Navot had five employees and a budget of NIS 368,872 in 2024.
