= Dror Etkes =

Israeli activist

Dror Etkes (Hebrew: דרור אטקס) is an Israeli left-wing activist who monitors settlement policies and activities. He worked at Peace Now and Yesh Din, and founded Kerem Navot in 2012.

== Life and career ==
Etkes was born into a religious household in Jerusalem. He grew up in the East Jerusalem neighborhood of Givat HaMivtar, where his parents moved shortly after the Six Day War: “I grew up in East Jerusalem, 1,000 feet from Palestinian homes. My childhood is a perfect example of the inability to look reality in the eye. One thousand feet from what we called ‘Arab homes.’ There was nothing in my childhood, including my parents or education, that pushed me to ask who or what existed there before.” He describes his parents as liberals. His father, Immanuel Etkes, is a history professor at Hebrew University. He attended a conservative religious school and was a member of the Bnei Akiva youth movement until the age of 15.

Etkes served in the Israeli army during the First Intifada, completing his service in 1989. After leaving the IDF he moved away from religious life and spent several years traveling in Europe, Central America, and the United States. His travels in Central America led him to see American foreign policy from a critical perspective. He returned to Israel in 1996 and began traveling through the West Bank, an easy and safe activity in the days before the Second Intifada. Etkes became involved with Peace Now, which asked him to lead its Settlement Watch project in 2002. In 2007 he moved on to Yesh Din, where he led the Settlement Policy Judicial Advocacy Project. In 2010 he left Yesh Din to found Kerem Navot, which also tracks settlement activities.

== Personal life ==
Etkes lives on a moshav with his partner and two daughters.
