= Naboth =

Biblical character in the Book of Kings

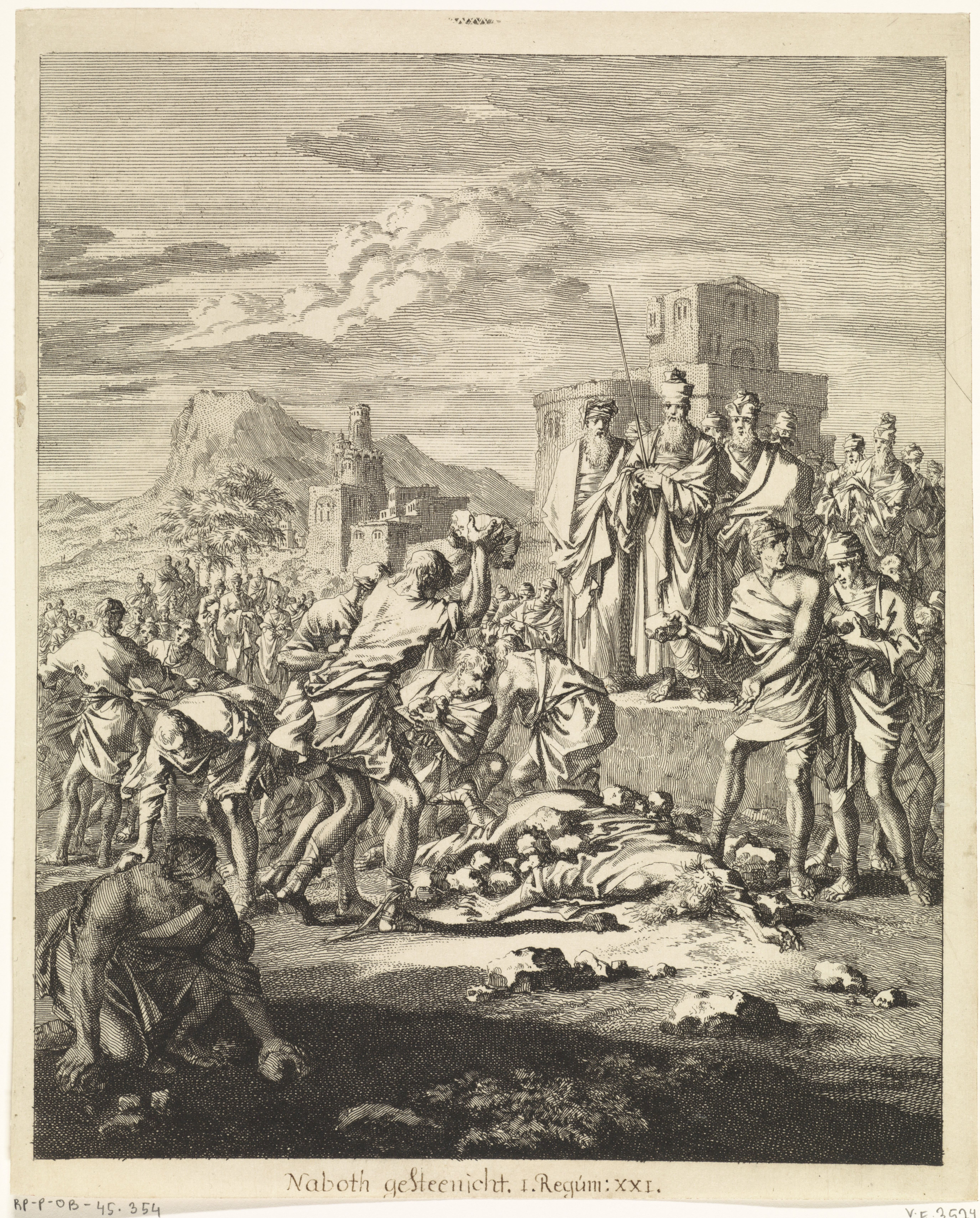
Copper engraving of the death of Naboth by Jan Luiken, 1708

Naboth (/ˈneɪbɒθ, -boʊθ/; Hebrew: נבות) was a citizen of Jezreel. According to the Book of Kings in the Hebrew Bible, he was executed by Jezebel, the queen of Israel, so that her husband Ahab could possess his vineyard.

== Narrative ==
According to 1 Kings 21:1–16, Naboth owned a vineyard that was close to Ahab's palace in Jezreel. Ahab asked Naboth if he could buy the vineyard so that he could use it as a vegetable (or herb) garden. Naboth refused because the land was ancestral inheritance. Some theorize that Naboth was also fearful of disobeying the Mosaic law which forbade the permanent selling of land.

Jezebel resolved the issue by writing a letter, under Ahab's name, to the elders and nobles of Jezreel. In the letter, the elders and nobles were instructed to organize a religious fast and exalt Naboth and bring forth two witnesses to (falsely) accuse Naboth of cursing God and the king. Afterwards, they were to stone Naboth to death outside the city. Commentators observe that these instructions deliberately adhered to the Biblical guidelines of criminal justice so that the public would not suspect foul play. That said, Jezebel explicitly calls the two witnesses "sons of Belial", which may be descriptive of their willingness to do anything to get paid.

The conspiracy succeeded, with Naboth's corpse being licked by stray dogs.

Emil G. Hirsch points out that "It seems from II Kings ix. 26 that Naboth's sons perished with their father, probably being killed soon afterward by order of Jezebel in order that they might not claim the vineyard as their inheritance." The executions also had precedent in the execution of Achan's family, as recorded in the Book of Joshua, which Jezebel was most likely inspired by. After Naboth and his sons were executed, Jezebel told Ahab that he could possess the vineyard.

Johannes Pedersen said that "The story teaches us that the king is bound to respect the proprietary rights of families..." According to rabbinic literature, Naboth's soul was the lying spirit that was permitted to deceive Ahab to his death. Naboth's death was further avenged after Jehu fatally shot Ahab's son Jehoram in the back with an arrow and threw his body in Naboth's former vineyard. Jezebel met a similar fate after she was thrown off a building, with her corpse devoured by dogs. According to the Bible, all of this was prophesized by prophet Elijah, who fiercely condemned Naboth's execution.

== Interpretations ==
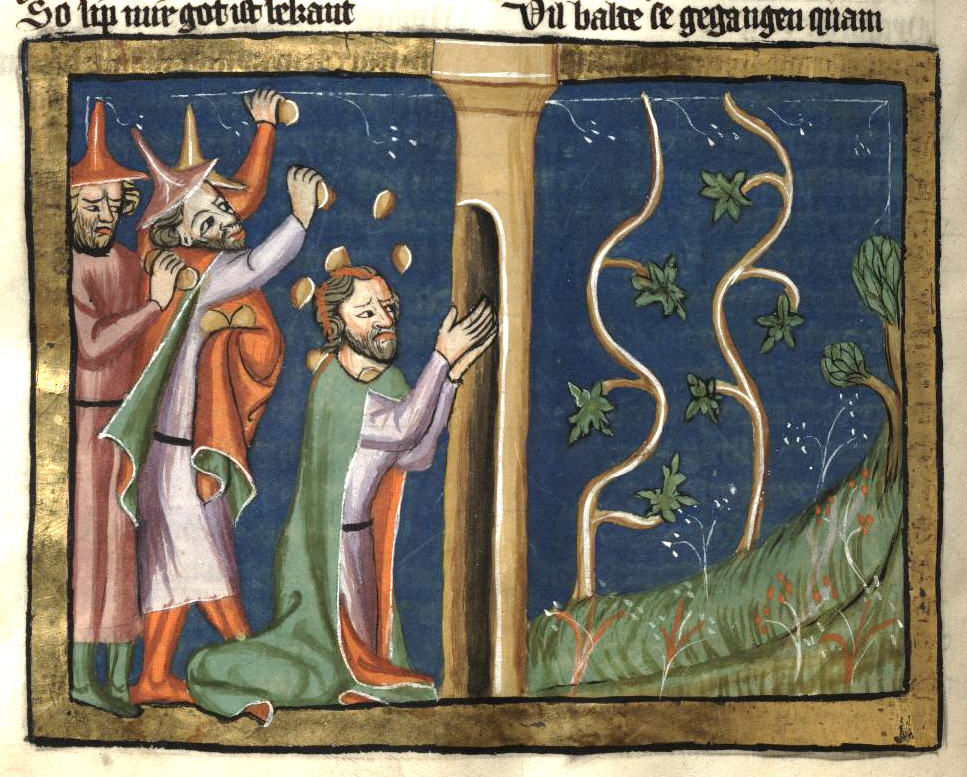
Naboth's stoning in front of the vineyard, Prague, 14th century

Archaeological exploration conducted by the University of Haifa and the University of Evansville discovered an ancient winery in the vicinity of an Iron Age IIB (900–700 BC) military enclosure at the foot of Tel Jezreel. While not definitely identifying the site as the location for the story of Naboth, archaeologist Dr. Norma Franklin, of the University of Haifa said that the vineyard appears to have been established sometime prior to 300 BCE, which would not be inconsistent with the time frame for Naboth. Franklin further noted, "Owning a vineyard would make him wealthy since wine was an important commodity. I reckon that since he was from the aristocracy he probably lived in Samaria and had more than one vineyard. This would give a slightly different picture than the Bible, which implies, though does not state explicitly, that he was a poor man being abused by the wealthy king."

Based on the dates of Ahab's death, which occurred three years after Naboth's death, it is presumed that Naboth died on 856–855 BC.

Francis Andersen observed that "Commentators have seen in the episode a clash of Israelite and Canaanite ideas of kingship, of citizenship, and of property."

Jewish medieval scholars sometimes used Elijah's words to Ahab "You have killed and also taken possession" ("הֲרָצַחְתָּ וְגַם יָרָשְׁתָּ") or the expression "Naboth's vineyard" to hint at double injustice (or crime committed with indecency, as opposed to "simply committed" crime). The Talmud also sees here a link to the prohibition of mixtures of milk and meat in Jewish law.

Roger Williams, the founder of the American colony of Rhode Island and the co-founder of the First Baptist Church in America, wrote about Naboth's story in The Bloudy Tenent of Persecution for Cause of Conscience as an example of how God disfavored Christians from using government force in religious matters, such as the religious decrees by Jezebel and Ahab. Williams believed using force in the name of religion would lead to political persecution contrary to the Bible.

== In popular culture ==
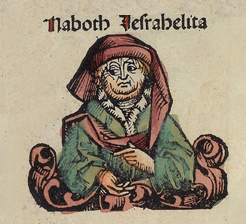
Naboth as illustrated in the 1493 Nuremberg Chronicle

There are a number of artistic, dramatic, musical and literary works that are based on, or inspired by, the story of Naboth and his vineyard. These are less common now than was once the case, as the use of the expression as a cultural reference appears to have declined.

=== Art ===
The 17th century Baroque pulpit in the late Gothic church of Sint Michiel, Roeselare in Belgium depicts the story of Naboth's Vineyard.

Naboth in his Vineyard, (1856) an oil painting by James Smetham held by Tate Britain.

Elijah confronting Ahab and Jezebel in Naboth's Vineyard, (1875) by Sir Frank Dicksee, a gold medal winner from the Royal Academy. The original is untraced since having been sold at auction in 1919 from the collection of Sir Merton Russell-Cotes; the British Museum holds a black & white print.

King Ahab's Coveting – Naboth Refuses Ahab his Vineyard, (1879) and Jezebel Promises Ahab to Obtain it by False Witness, (1879) both by Thomas Matthews Rooke (Sir Edward Burne-Jones's studio assistant), and held by the Russell-Cotes Art Gallery & Museum, Bournemouth.

=== Novels and short stories ===
Naboth (1886, in book form 1891), by Rudyard Kipling; Kipling sympathises with Ahab, and treats Naboth as being unreasonable in refusing his demands.

Naboth's Vineyard. A novel (1891), by E Œ Somerville and Martin Ross (Somerville and Ross).

Naboth's Vineyard (1928), a short horror story by the English novelist EF Benson.

Naboth's Vineyard (1928), a detective short story by Melville Davisson Post.

=== Poetry ===
Naboth's Vineyard: Or, The Innocent Traytor, (1679) a mock-Biblical verse satire by the Jacobite peer John Caryll whilst imprisoned in the Tower of London.

The Garden Plot, (1709) a sonnet by the Anglo-Irish satirist Jonathan Swift.

Naboth, the Jezreelite, (1844) a dramatic poem by Anne Flinders (the daughter of the explorer Matthew Flinders and the mother of the Egyptologist Flinders Petrie).

=== Music ===
Naboth, (1702) an oratorio by Domenico Filippo Bottari.

Sinfonia a quattro No 11 in D minor ("Naboth"), (1729) a symphony by the Italian Baroque composer Antonio Caldara.

Naboth's Weinbert, (1781) an oratorio by Romano Reutter.

Naboth's Vineyard, (1968) a madrigal for three voices, forming the first part of a trilogy by the English composer Alexander Goehr.

La vigne de Naboth: pièce en cinq actes et un épilogue, (1981) by the Belgian composer André Laporte.

Naboth's Vineyard, (1983) a work for recorders, cello and harpsichord by the English composer Malcolm Lipkin.

Custodian – An Ex Parte Oratorio, (2018) a protest oratorio for an a cappella choir by the Israeli composer Uri Agnon combining the stories of Naboth's Vineyard and the eviction of the Palestinian Sumreen family from their home in Silwan.

=== Theatre ===
‘’Faust: Part Two, Act One’’ Faust re-enacts the story and Mephisto cites it

Naboth's Vineyard; a stage piece, (1925) a play in three acts by the English novelist and playwright Clemence Dane.

La Vigne de Nabot, (lost date) a piece of black theatre (a form of puppetry making use of shadows) by the French puppeteer Georges Lafaye (puppeteer).

Eating, (1979) a retelling of the story of Naboth, focusing on the gluttony of Ahab, by the Israeli playwright Yaakov Shabtai.

=== Ballet ===
Naboth's Vineyard (1953), a ballet by the Austrian-born American composer Eric Zeisl, although it has not been produced or choreographed in full.

=== Film ===
Sins of Jezebel, (1953) a drama film directed by the Austrian-born American director Reginald LeBorg; Ludwig Donath played Naboth.

Leviathan, (2014) a drama film directed by the Russian filmmaker Andrey Zvyagintsev, partly based on the story of Marvin Heemeyer, and partly on the Biblical stories of Job and Naboth's Vineyard.

=== Politics ===
The Confederation of Canada, celebrated July 1, 1867, was largely motivated by Canadians' fear that the United States would annex and absorb these northern British colonies. "An indication of just how seriously John A. Macdonald (Canada's First Prime Minister) took this mood is contained in a letter he wrote shortly before leaving England.... 'I sail in four days for Canada with the act uniting all British America in my pocket. A brilliant future would certainly await us were it not for those wretched Yankees who hunger & thirst for Naboth's field - War will come some day between England & the United States.'"

Naboth's Vineyard, (1870) a speech by the Congressman Charles Sumner strongly opposing President Ulysses S. Grant's proposed annexation of the Dominican Republic (then called San Domingo).

Lt Gen Sir William Butler undertook a visit of South Africa in 1907 and reported his findings as From Naboth's Vineyard.

The Israeli anti-settlement NGO Kerem Navot ("Naboth's Vineyard"), founded in 2012, takes its name from the story.

== See also ==
- Legal plunder
