= Hillel Rivlin =

Lithuanian rabbi (1757–1838)

Hillel Rivlin of Shklov (Hebrew: הלל ריבלין; 16 September 1757 – 2 June 1838; 2 Tishrei 5518 – 9 Sivan 5598) was a close disciple of the Vilna Gaon. Along with some other pupils of the Vilna Gaon, he is credited with having revitalized the Ashkenazi community in what is now Israel (then the Ottoman province of Damascus Eyalet), by immigrating to Jerusalem in 1809.

== Early life ==
Hillel Rivlin's father was Rabbi Binyamin Rivlin of Shklov, the cousin and student of the Vilna Gaon.

== Personal life ==
Rivlin married Zipora, the daughter of Moshe Yozal in Hever. Their son, Rabbi Moshe Rivlin, was the rabbi of the Ashkenazi community in Jerusalem from 1840 to 1846. Rivlin's son-in-law was the philanthropist and businessman Shmarihu Luria of Mohilev, the father-in-law of Rabbi David Friedman of Karlin and Yehiel Michal Pines. Rivlin's descendants, starting with his great-grandson Rabbi Yosef Rivlin, were among the first settlers to live outside the walls of the Old City of Jerusalem. He is considered one of the patriarchs of the Rivlin family, and is an ancestor of Israeli President Reuven Rivlin.

== Career ==
In 1782, when the Gaon of Vilna realized he would not be able to immigrate to the Land of Israel, he appointed Hillel Rivlin to head the "Chazon Zion" movement which helped organize Jews from Belarus to immigrate to Israel. In 1809, Rivlin, as the head of a group of the students of the Gra, immigrated to the Land of Israel.

== Author ==
He was also the author of the esoteric text known as Kol HaTor, that describes the 999 footsteps of the Messiah's arrival. Until approximately the 1980s the book was preserved only in manuscript form, when it began to be published in stages.
