= Immanuel Etkes =

Israeli historian

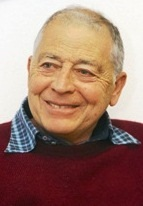
Immanuel Etkes

Immanuel Etkes (born 1939) is emeritus professor of history of the Jewish people at the Hebrew University of Jerusalem. His research focuses on religious and cultural movements among Eastern European Jews in the eighteenth and nineteenth centuries. Allan Nadler describes his biographies of the Vilna Gaon, the Baal Shem Tov, Rabbi Schneur Zalman of Liadi, and Rabbi Israel Salanter, as "definitive." He was awarded the Bialik Prize in 2010.

Etkes was born in Tel Aviv. He grew up in a Religious Zionist environment and was a member of the Bnei Akiva youth movement. In 2010 he participated in the protest movement against the displacement of Palestinian residents from Sheikh Jarrah. The anti-settlement activist Dror Etkes is one of his four children.

== Books in English translation ==
- Rabbi Israel Salanter and the Mussar Movement: Seeking the Torah of Truth. Jewish Publication Society, 1993.
- The Gaon of Vilna: The Man and His Image. University of California Press, 2002.
- The Besht: Magician, Mystic, and Leader. UPNE, 2012.
- Rabbi Shneur Zalman of Liady: The Origins of Chabad Hasidism. Brandeis University Press, 2014.
