= Vilna Gaon =

Polish-Lithuanian rabbi and Talmudist (1720–1797)

HaGaon Elijah ben Solomon Zalman
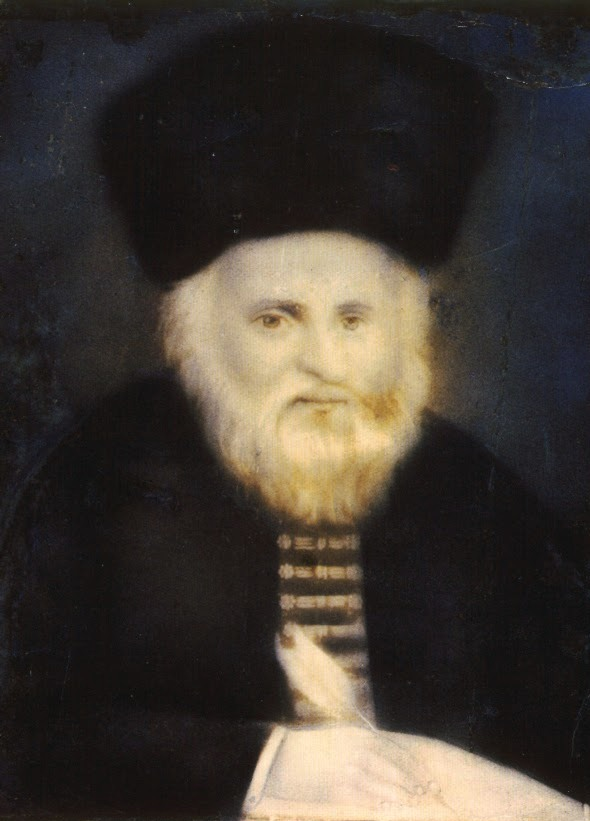
- Title: Vilna Gaon; Elijah of Vilna; Gr"a

Personal life
- Born: Elijah ben Solomon Zalman; April 23, 1720 Sialiec, Polish–Lithuanian Commonwealth
- Died: October 9, 1797 (aged 77) Vilnius, Vilna Governorate, Russian Empire
- Buried: Vilnius, Lithuania

Religious life
- Religion: Judaism
- Denomination: Orthodox Judaism

Jewish leader
- Yahrtzeit: 19 Tishrei

Elijah ben Solomon Zalman, (Note: Within recent decades he has been given the surname Kremer. However neither the Vilna Gaon nor his descendants apparently used this surname, which means shopkeeper. It was possibly mistakenly derived from a nickname of his ancestor Rabbi Moshe Kremer. "The Vilna Gaon, part 3 (Review of Eliyahu Stern, The Genius)". Marc B. Shapiro. The Polish-Lithuanian Commonwealth census of 1765 (see image) refers to the Vilna Gaon as "Eliasz Zelmanowiz", probably because his father's name was "Zalman" (see here for an explanation of the suffix "-witz"). Ben-Ghedalia, Dr. Yochai (January 30, 2020). "The Vilna Gaon Makes a Surprise Appearance". The Librarians.) (Hebrew: ר' אליהו בן שלמה זלמן Rabbi Eliyahu ben Shlomo Zalman), also known as the Vilna Gaon (Yiddish: דער װילנער גאון Der Vilner Goen; Polish: Gaon z Wilna, Gaon Wileński; or Elijah of Vilna; Sialiec, Polish–Lithuanian Commonwealth, April 23, 1720 – Vilnius, Russian Empire, October 9, 1797), was a Lithuanian Jewish talmudist, halakhist, kabbalist, and the foremost leader of misnagdic (non-hasidic) Jewry of the past few centuries.

He is commonly referred to or by his Hebrew acronym גר״א Gr״a Gaon Rabbenu Eliyahu "Our teacher Elijah the Genius", or in Modern Hebrew as ha-Gaon mi-Vilna "the genius from Vilnius".

Through his annotations and emendations of Talmudic and other texts, he became one of the most familiar and influential figures in rabbinic study since the Middle Ages. Although he is chronologically one of the Acharonim, some have considered him one of the Rishonim.

Large groups of people, including many yeshivas, uphold the minhag (set customs and rites) named after him, and which is also considered by many to be the prevailing minhag among Ashkenazi Jews in Jerusalem today.

Born in Sielec in the Brest Litovsk Voivodeship (now Syalyets, Belarus), the Gaon displayed extraordinary talent while still a child. By the time he was twenty years old, rabbis were submitting their most difficult halakhic problems to him for legal rulings. He was a prolific author, writing such works as glosses on the Babylonian Talmud and Shulchan Aruch known as Bi'urei ha-Gra "Elaborations by the Gra", a running commentary on the Mishnah, Shenoth Eliyahu "The Years of Elijah", and insights on the Torah entitled Adereth Eliyahu ("The Cloak of Elijah"), published by his son. Various Kabbalistic commentaries bear his name, and he wrote commentaries on the Book of Proverbs and other books of the Hebrew Bible later in life. None of his manuscripts was published in his lifetime.

When Hasidic Judaism became influential in his native town, the Vilna Gaon joined the Misnagdim, the rabbis and heads of Polish communities trying to curb Hasidic influence.

While he advocated studying branches of secular education such as mathematics to better understand rabbinic texts, he harshly condemned the study of philosophy and metaphysics.

== Biography ==
Elijah was born to Treina and Shlomo Zalman, a rabbi, in the village of Slać near Brisk, now Brest, Belarus, then in Lithuania, part of the Polish–Lithuanian Commonwealth, on 15 Nisan 5480 AM (April 23, 1720 CE).

His grandfather was Yissachar Dov, the son of Rabbi Eliyahu Chassid, after whom he was named. Eliyahu was the son of Moshe Kramer, rabbi of Vilne (now Vilnius), and his wife was the granddaughter of Moshe Rivkes, also a rabbi.

Until the age of six, he studied under a rabbi. At that age, he delivered a derasha in the Great Synagogue of Vilna that his father had taught him. At the request of Heschel, the Av Beit Din of Vilne, he added his own scholarly discourse to demonstrate his ability to innovate independently. His book Shnot Eliyahu contains an insight he expressed at age 7. At this age, he lived for about three months in Kaidan with the town's rabbi, David Katzenellenbogen, studying under him and Moses Margolies, author of Pnei Moshe on the Jerusalem Talmud and who later served as rabbi of Kaidan. At age nine, he began studying Kabbalah, devoting several hours daily to studying the Zohar and the writings of the Isaac Luria. By age ten, he studied independently and no longer required teachers. During this period, he befriended Aryeh Leib, who later served as the Av Beit Din of Tsechanovitz. From the age of eight, he engaged in astronomy.

As a young man, he married Chana, daughter of Yehuda Leib of Kaidan (1724–1782). His wife took responsibility for managing the household so he could devote himself entirely to study. After she died in 5543 AM (1783 CE), he requested that the following be inscribed on her tombstone: "Chana passed away in 5543, 5 Kislev. She left no equal or comparison / There is no path or way to recount her praise." Later, he married Gitl, daughter of Meir Luntz from Chełm, who was also a widow.

At around age 20, he traveled to Poland and Germany, passing through Leszno and Berlin, and possibly also Amsterdam. He returned to Vilna in 1745. Over the years, he lived in Vilna but consistently refused to hold an official rabbinic position that would interfere with his studies. Nevertheless, the Vilna community, considering it an honor to have him in their city, granted him a small monthly stipend for his livelihood.

The Vilna Gaon became famous for his extraordinary diligence. His sons recount that throughout his life, he slept only two hours a day, divided into four half-hour segments, ensuring he never slept more than "Sixty Breaths". He dedicated all his time exclusively to Torah study. His student, Chaim of Volozhin, described how, when he was preoccupied with a Talmudic difficulty, he would refrain from eating for days until he found a resolution, appearing emaciated and afflicted.

== Status ==
The Vilna Gaon attained an extraordinary and undisputed status during his lifetime. Among the general non-Hasidic public, his standing was considered exceptional. He was perceived as belonging to the ranks of the Tannaim and Amoraim, the sages of the Talmud, or as akin to the Geonim of Lower Mesopotamia.

Avrohom Yeshaya Karelitz wrote:

We regard the Gaon of Vilna as belonging to the ranks of Moses, Ezra, Rabbeinu HaKadosh, Rav Ashi, and the Rambam. The Gaon, through whom Torah was revealed as a sanctified figure destined to illuminate that which had remained in darkness until his time, is considered one of the Rishonim. His level of Ruach HaKodesh (Divine inspiration), his toil, and his profound analytical knowledge of the entirety of Torah as we possess it today—these are beyond comprehension. (Note: Similarly, in Ketav VeHaKabbalah, in his letter at the beginning of the book Aliyot Eliyahu, he writes: "The awe-inspiring Gaon, like one of the Rishonim, our master Eliyahu of Vilna." Likewise, in Responsa Mahari’az Enzil, Siman 37 (by a student of the Ketzot HaChoshen and Av Beit Din of Stryi in Galicia), he lists a series of early halachic authorities and notes: "And Rabbi Eliyahu of Vilna, whose strength was like one of the Rishonim." Rabbi Avraham Danzig wrote in his introduction to the book Zichru Torat Moshe: We were privileged to see with our own eyes our master, the great and holy Gaon of Israel, Rabbi Eliyahu Chassid. He was an irreplaceable saint, like one of the Rishonim, and all the qualities that the Sages attributed to a Torah scholar were manifest in him—whether in Torah, in piety, or in his conduct, his vast knowledge...)

Due to this reverence, he was referred to by Litvaks simply as "the Gaon."

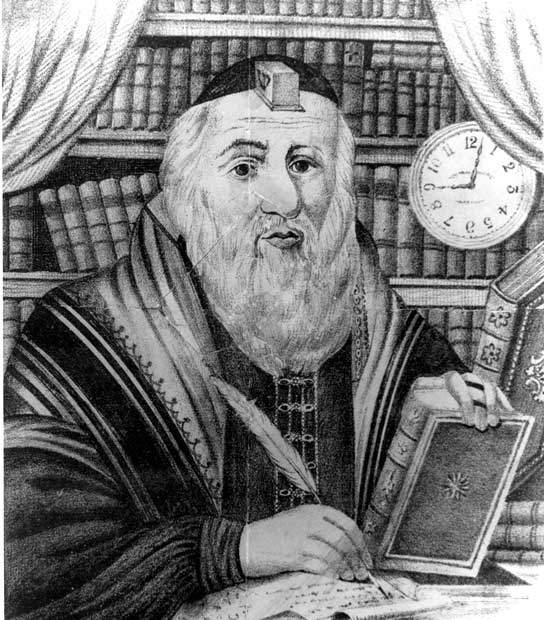
A portrait attributed to the Vilna Gaon

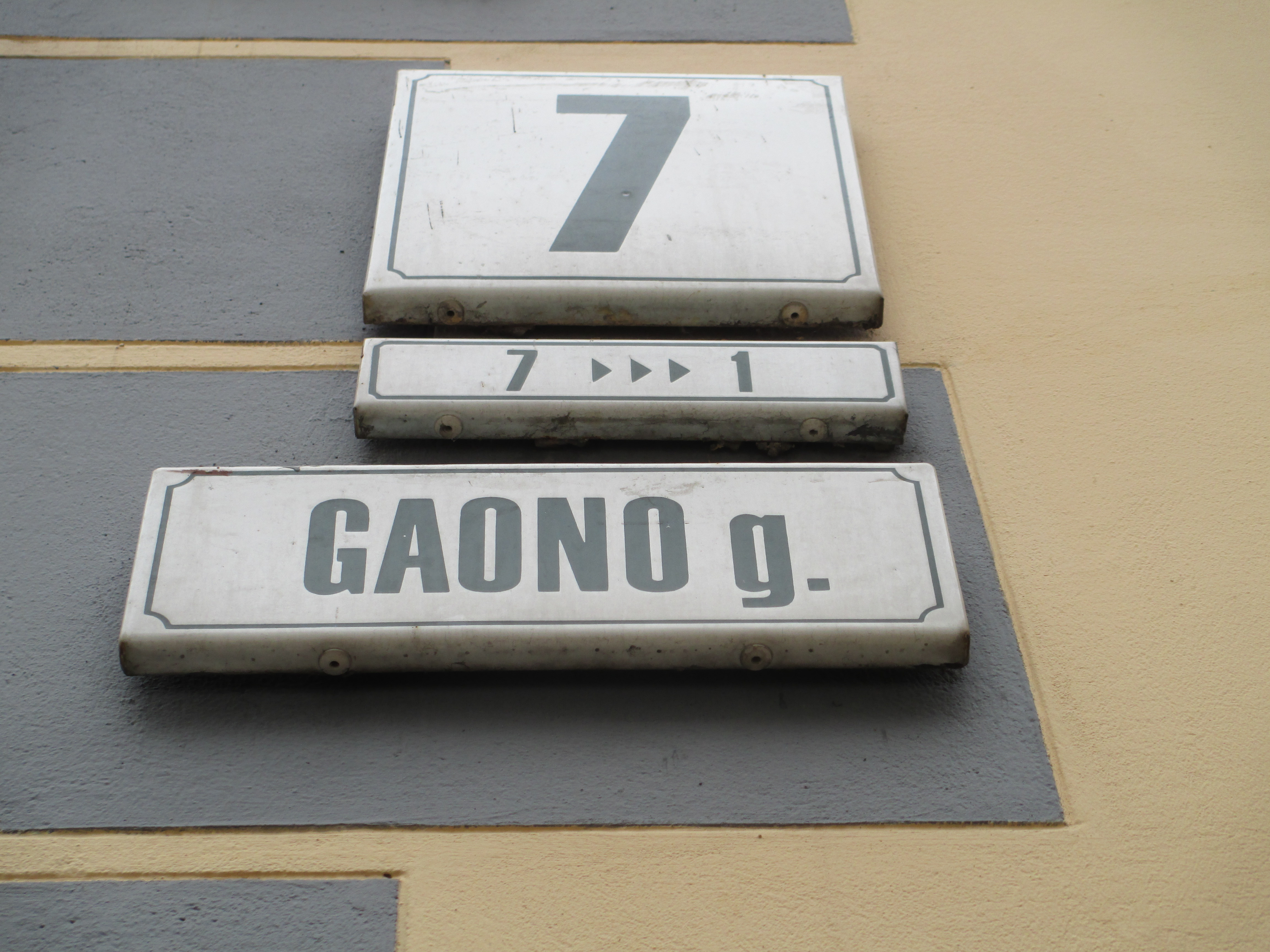
A street sign named after the Vilna Gaon in Vilnius

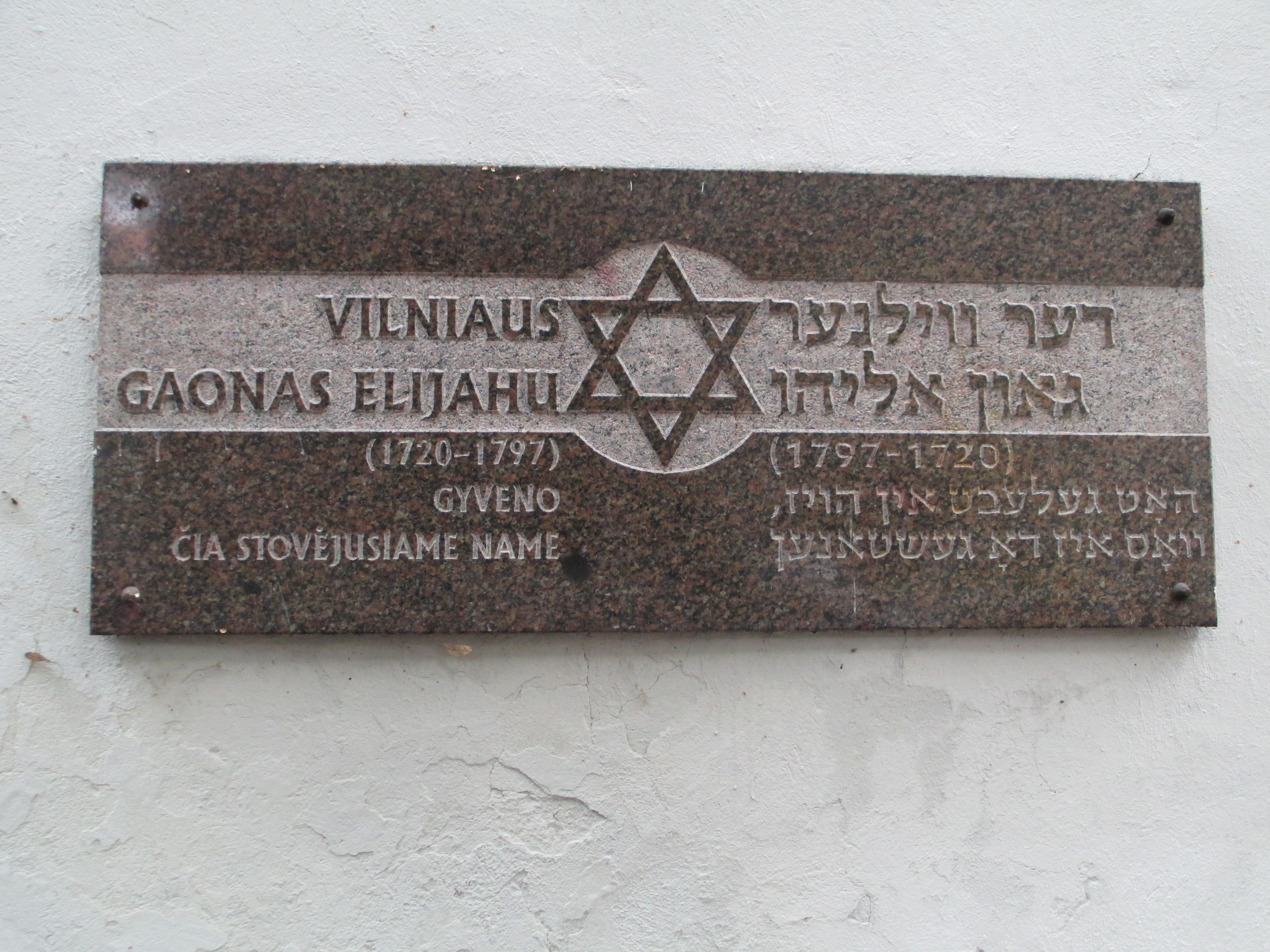
A commemorative plaque in Vilnius at the site where the Vilna Gaon's house once stood, inscribed: "The Gaon Eliyahu of Vilna lived in the house that stood here."

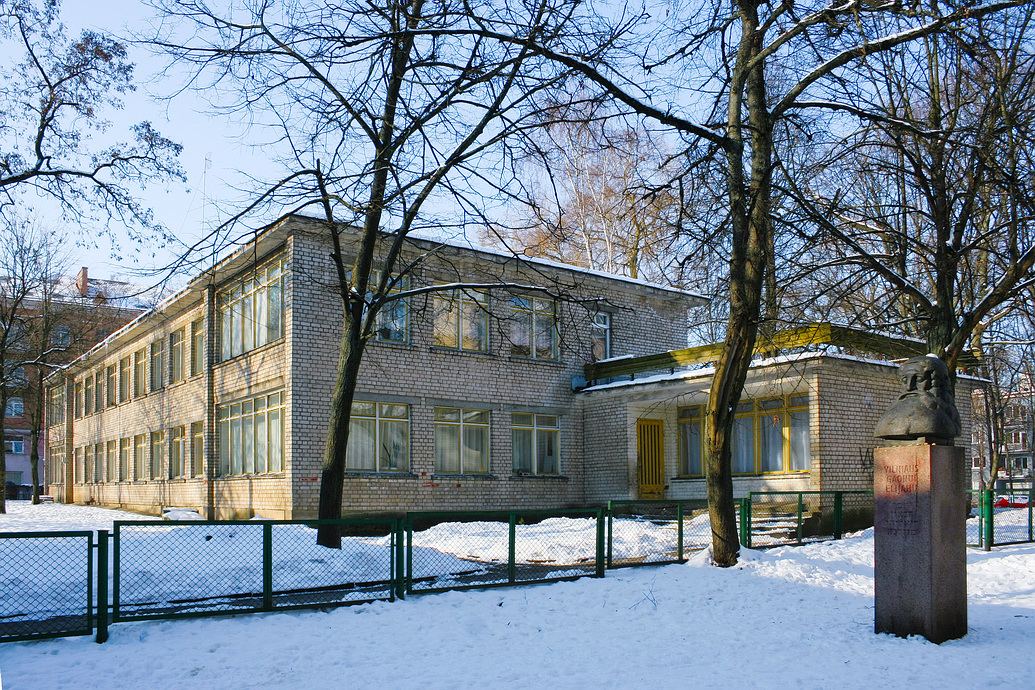
The place of the Great Synagogue and the Monument of Vilna Gaon, Vilnius

The Vilna Gaon advocated for a study approach focused on the peshat (literal meaning) and was himself widely knowledgeable and erudite. His in-law, the author of Chayei Adam, wrote, "The entire Torah was laid out before him like a set table, so that if he was asked about any matter, he would answer instantaneously." (Note: See also Chut HaMeshulash responsa by Chaim of Volozhin, end of Siman 17.)

He opposed pilpul (sharp dialectical analysis) in learning like Maimonides, Judah Loew ben Bezalel, Abraham Isaac Kook, and other sages. In his small study hall, students learned Talmud with the commentaries of Rashi, Asher ben Jehiel, and Isaac Alfasi, in a straightforward manner aimed at reaching halachic conclusions.

The Vilna Gaon was highly original in his halachic rulings. He often ruled according to his own understanding of the Talmud, even against the Rishonim and the Shulchan Aruch, or in opposition to established minhag.

His learning was grounded in a deep pursuit of the literal meaning of the sources, as well as in textual emendations, particularly in less commonly studied works such as the Jerusalem Talmud, the Tosefta, and the Zohar. Despite his historical significance to the Misnagdim, the method of study practiced in contemporary litvak yeshivas differs significantly from his approach. Most of his textual emendations were not based on manuscript evidence available to him but rather on his exceptional mastery of rabbinic and Talmudic literature. In retrospect, many of his emendations have been found to align with accurate textual witnesses.

On the evening following Yom Kippur, the Vilna Gaon would continue fasting for several more hours while studying Torah, citing this passage:

What is the meaning of the verse: 'And it was evening, and it was morning, the sixth day' (Genesis 1:31)? Why is the extra 'the' needed? This teaches that God made a condition with the works of creation, saying: If Israel accepts the Torah, you will continue to exist; but if not, I will return you to chaos and void.

— Babylonian Talmud, Shabbat 88a

In other words, the world's existence depends on uninterrupted Torah study. Since, on the night after Yom Kippur, everyone went home to eat, the Vilna Gaon would continue learning until people finished their meals and returned to study. This idea also served as the foundation of Volozhin Yeshiva, established by his disciple, Chaim of Volozhin.

=== Kabbalah in his teachings ===
By the age of nine, the Vilna Gaon knew all of Tanach and Shas with commentaries, and had already begun studying Kabbalah.

The Gaon wrote commentaries on the Sifra de-Tzeniuta, which he regarded as the foundational work of Kabbalah, as well as on Tikkunei Zohar, Tikkunei Zohar Chadash, and other sections of the Zohar and the Sefer Yetzirah.

However, unlike other Kabbalists, the Gaon opposed the reception of maggidic revelations, preferring to engage in Torah study and receive divine wisdom directly from God rather than through intermediaries. He also sent his disciple, Chaim of Volozhin, to warn his brother, Shlomo Zalman of Volozhin, not to accept a maggid that was destined to appear to him, explaining that the maggidim of that generation, particularly outside the Land of Israel, "could not possibly be entirely sacred and free of any impurity."

The teachings of the Vilna Gaon in Kabbalah are considered a distinct stream (although they are sometimes integrated with the teachings of Ramchal). Many Kabbalists have studied and interpreted them, such as his disciples Chaim of Volozhin in his book Nefesh HaChaim, Moshe of Tolchin, Menachem Mendel of Shklov, and the disciples of his disciples, Yitzhak Isaac Chever, David Luria, Avraham Simcha of Amchislav, Elijah of Kalish, as well as Shlomo Elyashiv in the Leshem Shevo VeAchlamah, Naftali Herz Halevy of Jaffa, and others.

The writings of the Vilna Gaon have been studied in the present day by Yitzhak Shlomo Zilberman, Sraya Dublitzky, Israel Eliyahu Winterob, Yaakov Edes (Divrei Yaakov), and Yosef Avivi, who also wrote a book explaining the uniqueness of the Vilna Gaon's Kabbalah and the differences between it and the Kabbalah of Isaac Luria.

During the struggle between the Hasidim and the Misnagdim, the Hasidim spread a rumor that the Vilna Gaon did not believe in the teachings of Kabbalah and did not read the Zohar or the writings of Isaac Luria. By doing so, they sought to undermined the Gaon's opposition to Hasidism. The Vilna Gaon's disciple, Rabbi Chaim of Volozhin, in his introduction to the Vilna Gaon's commentary on Sifra D’Tzeniuta, sharply criticizes those who spread the rumor, with the following words:

And whenever I speak of the greatness and wonders of the holiness of the teachings of our great Rabbi, may his soul rest in peace, I remember and recall with great anguish that my soul is stirred and burned with a fire within me. For I heard many false reports from empty fools in distant provinces, who had never seen the light of his teachings or his holiness. Those without burden in speech and tongue speak of great things to defame the sanctities of Heaven. Like flies of death who seek to spoil and defile the holy oil of our great Rabbi, may his soul rest in peace. They say that the holy Rabbi did not consider the spirit of holiness in the teachings of the Arizal to be of any worth, God forbid. And even further, some speak maliciously, claiming that the holy Zohar was not worthy in his eyes, Heaven forbid, to be the subject of his study. May the lips of falsehood be stilled, and the liars be silenced. Such things shall not be among the people of Israel.

=== The teachings of redemption in his doctrine ===
According to the book Kol HaTor, which some attribute to Hillel Rivlin of Shklov, in 1740 CE (5500 AM), the Gaon began his public engagement with Kabbalah. According to his views on the Redemption, the year 5500 AM marks the beginning of the "sixth day" of the world, in which preparations should be made for Shabbat, when the complete redemption will come. This calculation is based on the Talmud, Sanhedrin 38b, which states that the world will exist for six thousand years. The Gaon considered each millennium as a day, based on the verse "For a thousand years in Your eyes are but as yesterday when it passes" in Psalm 90, 4, meaning that 5500 AM is the morning of the sixth day. Just as the halakhah requires early rising on Friday to prepare for the Shabbat, so, according to the Gaon, one should prepare for the Shabbat of the world starting from the "morning of the sixth day." The authenticity of Kol Hator is disputed by some historians, notably Immanuel Etkes who argues that the text is a fabrication intended to promote a messianic-Zionist ideology.

=== A new Shulchan Aruch ===
According to what was written by the Gaon's son, the Gaon intended to compose a new version of the Shulchan Aruch:

These two things I heard from his holy and pure mouth that he did not agree with his creator's opinion, and he did not do them. In his old age, I asked him many times why he did not travel to the Holy Land, and he did not answer me. And he promised me that he would write halakhic rulings from the Arba'ah Turim with a decisive opinion, writing only the one opinion that seemed correct to his wisdom, with strong and unanswerable proofs.

=== His attitude towards secular studies and philosophy ===
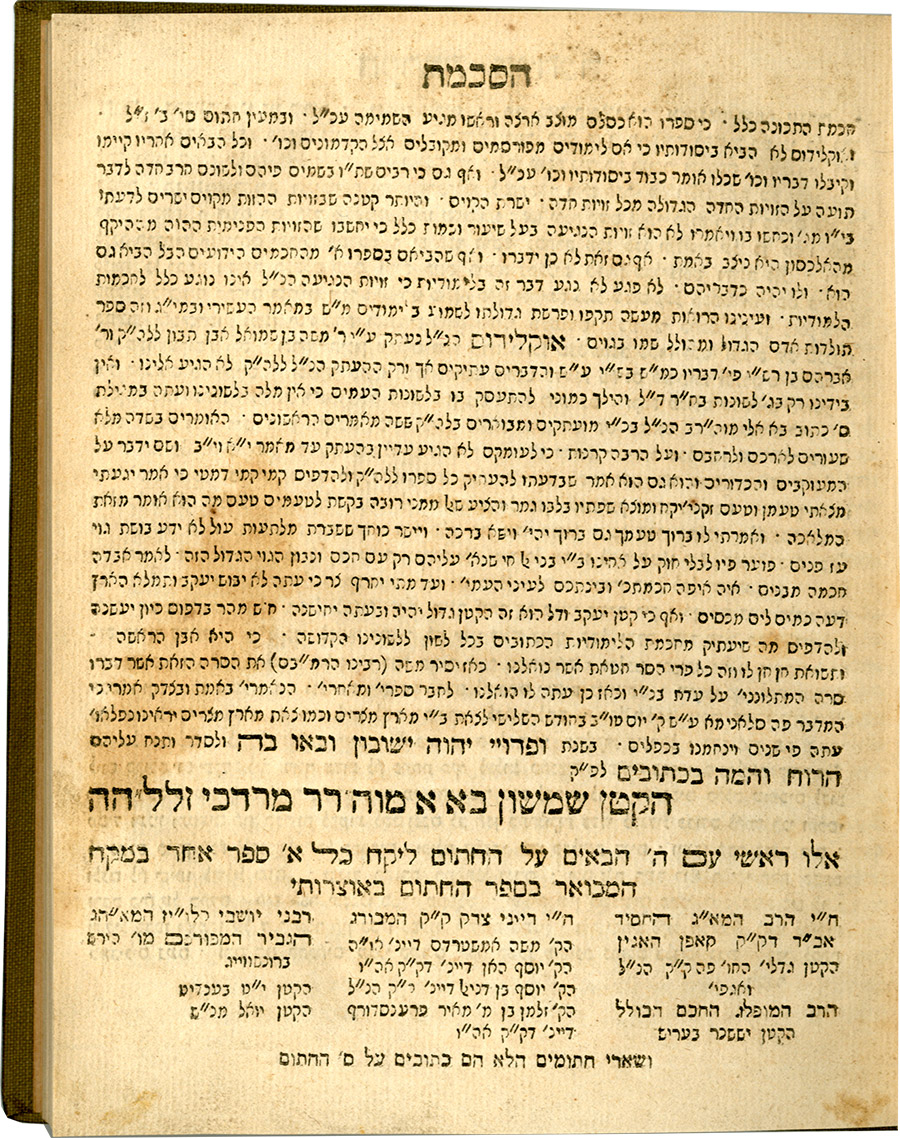
Euclid's Elements, translated at the Gaon's encouragement

The Gaon supported secular studies, including natural science, and even wrote a book on mathematics, astronomy, and geometry titled Ayil Meshulash. In the introduction to the translation of Euclid's Elements (translated into Hebrew by Baruch Shklov in The Hague in 1780), it is quoted in his name:

Just as a person will lack knowledge of other wisdoms, so too will they be missing a hundredfold in the wisdom of Torah… And he commanded me (= the Gaon) to translate from what we can of these wisdoms into our holy tongue to remove the poison from their mouths, and many will be enlightened, and knowledge will increase among the people of Israel.

The words of Baruch Shik are supported by a translation written by the Vilna Gaon's son, Avraham Vilner, of parts of the Natural History by the radical French scientist Georges-Louis Leclerc, Comte de Buffon.

According to the testimony of his disciples and the books written in his name, the Gaon was knowledgeable in mathematics, engineering, biology, astronomy, geography, linguistics, and music, but he refrained from engaging in pharmacy based on his father's instructions.

He also studied human philosophy but opposed the study of the humanities in general because he did not see them as having intrinsic value for Jewish life. The Gaon distinguished between the humanities and the natural sciences, which he regarded as "pharmacology and medicine" that assist in understanding the Torah.

Yisrael Shklov recounts the Gaon's teachings:

Thus he said, all wisdoms are necessary for our Torah ... and are included in it, and all must be known to their purpose, and he mentioned them: the wisdom of algebra, triangles, and engineering and the wisdom of music. ... And he explained the nature of all the wisdoms and said that he had attained them for their purpose, except for the wisdom of medicine, he knew the science of surgery and its connection to it, but he was forbidden by his father to study the practice of medicines and their work, so as not to be distracted from his Torah study when he would be required to go and save lives, once he knew it fully. Likewise, the wisdom of witchcraft ... and he knew it, but he was lacking in the practice of herbs and all their workings, because they were in the hands of the Gentiles who are heretics, and thus he could not learn their full practice due to his strong commitment.

— P'atei HaShulchan, Introduction, Speech Starting: "And an extended explanation on its side"

In contrast to his view on natural sciences, he strongly opposed philosophy and its practitioners, as stated in the Even Shlomo, a compilation of his writings, in chapter 11, section 4. "Blessed are those who distance themselves from those who engage in the study of divine, logical, and natural philosophy. They will merit, in the future, to the light of God (Isaiah 2:6)." A footnote said:

See in Yoreh De'ah, section 319, small section 13, where he also condemned false philosophy, and see in the book Aliyot Eliyahu 17:2. And contrary to those who say that what he wrote in Yoreh De'ah in the aforementioned section is not from the Gaon. I heard from a trusted person that it is indeed found in his handwriting exactly as demonstrated here. And see Yoreh De'ah, section 456, small section 18.

In his commentary on the Book of Isaiah, chapter 2, verse 6, the Vilna Gaon offers a mystical interpretation of the verse. He reads the text as a hidden praise of those who separate themselves from corrupt influences in pursuit of divine truth:

"For you have forsaken your people" – meaning, for the merit of having forsaken your people, as it is written: "Forget your people and the house of your father, and the king will desire your beauty." (Tanakh, Psalms 45:11–12). That is, by spiritually distancing oneself from a society immersed in error, one becomes worthy of closeness to God.

"For they are full of old" – meaning, because your people are full of "old", that is why you forsook them and merited the light of God. The Gaon interprets "old" not negatively, but as a reference to the Divine, as in: "The habitation of the God of old." (Tanakh, Deuteronomy 33:27). Thus, the people are full of ancient, perhaps divine, knowledge—yet they have misused or distorted it.

"And clouds" – refers to those who claim to interpret the heavens and determine times, i.e., astrologers, as in: "The astrologers of the heavens." (Tanakh, Isaiah 47:13). The society is obsessed with occult knowledge and trying to control fate through the stars.

"And children of strangers" – refers to foreign ideologies, specifically natural philosophy, which the Gaon views as alien to the divine path.

In this commentary, the Gaon suggests that separating from a society fixated on astrology, foreign wisdoms, and misapplied spiritual traditions can elevate a person spiritually. Rather than interpreting the verse as divine abandonment, he reads it as a description of the righteous individual’s inner journey away from external confusion and toward divine truth.

The Vilna Gaon's commentary on Yoreh De'ah, section 319, subsection 6, small subsection 13:

The Rambam ... followed philosophy, and therefore he wrote that witchcraft, names, incantations, demons, and amulets are all false. But they have struck him on his head, for we find many stories in the Talmud regarding names and witchcraft. ... And philosophy misled him, for in the majority, it took him to interpret the Talmud in a derisive way and to uproot them from their simple meaning. God forbid, I do not believe in them, nor in their sources, nor in their power. Rather, all these things are as their simple meaning, but there is a deeper meaning not of the philosophers, which is superficial, but of the people of truth.

— Yeshu'ah D'ra'ah (Vilna Gaon's Commentary on Yoreh De'ah, 319, 6, subsection 13)

Some saw his favorable attitude towards secular studies as the reason for the spread of the Haskala in Lithuania more than in Hasidic Poland. This claim was refuted in later research.

== Attempt to make Aliyah to the Land of Israel ==
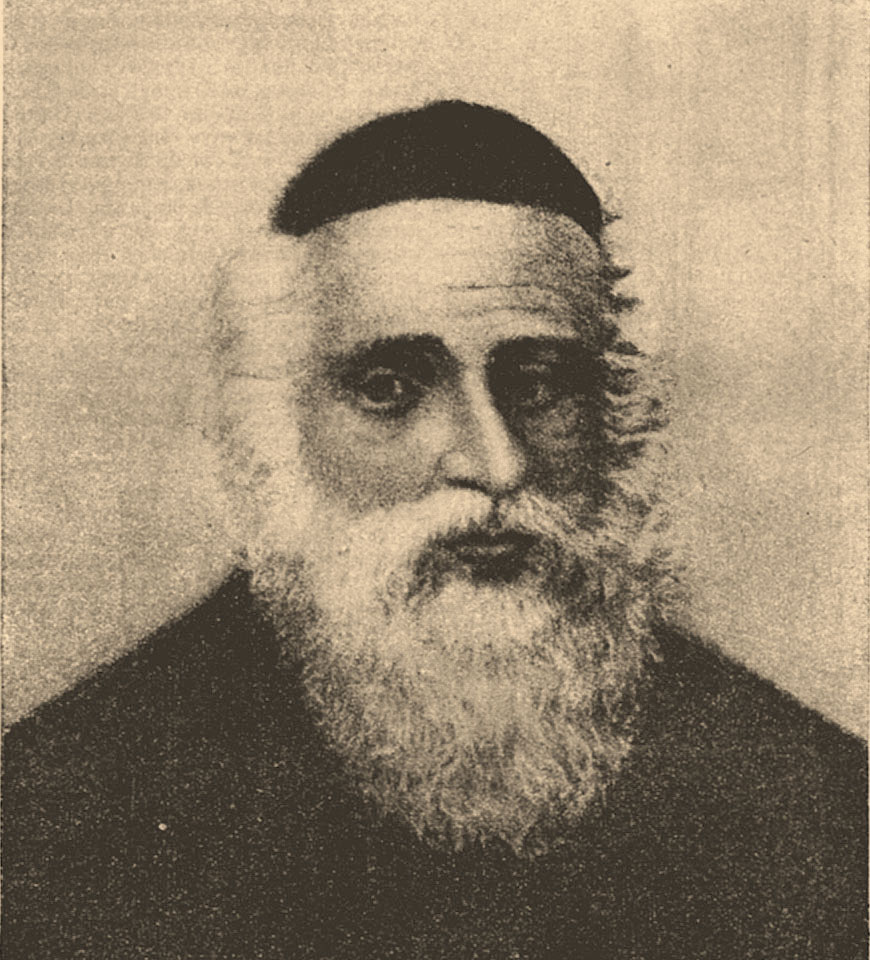
A common portrait of the Vilna Gaon

In his old age, I (his son) asked him (Gaon of Vilna) many times why he did not visit the Holy Land and he did not answer me. Once, after I entreated him at length, he replied, ‘I did not receive permission from heaven.’

It is known that the Vilna Gaon tried to immigrate to the Land of Israel, and even wrote a letter to his family while traveling to Königsberg, which was later published under the title "Aliyah to Terufah." In the letter, he wrote that he was going to the "desired Land of Israel and the desire of God, whose upper and lower realms yearn for it." However, this attempt was unsuccessful, and he decided to return home, stating that he had no permission from heaven to make aliyah to the Land of Israel.

There is disagreement regarding the year in which the Vilna Gaon tried to make aliyah. Dov Eliyach, in his book "The Gaon," tries to prove from the wording of the letter that the attempt occurred when the Gaon was around forty years old, likely in the winter of 5520 AM (1759–1760). The book 'Kol HaTor' states that he attempted to make aliyah in the year 5542 AM (1782 CE). In contrast, Dr. Aryeh Morgenstern argues that the attempt occurred around the year 5538 AM (1778 CE), based on documents from the Jewish community in Holland mentioning a person named "Rabbi Eliyahu from Vilna," although it is unclear whether this refers to the Gaon. Eli Eliyach suggested that the attempt took place in the summer of the year 5527 AM (1767 CE).

As described in the book Kol HaTor, the Vilna Gaon sought to renew the Jewish settlement in the Land of Israel, to revive its desolate areas, and to create a group of wise and moral individuals whom he called "Anshei Emunah" (People of Faith). He believed this would pave the way for the arrival of the Messiah, whom he anticipated would appear in the year 5600 AM (1840 CE). He proclaimed, "The voice of the turtle dove is heard in our land" (based on Song of Songs 2:12).

Following his teachings and through the initiative of his disciple Rabbi Chaim of Volozhin, many of his students made aliyah to the Land of Israel beginning in the year 5568AM (1808 CE), in the aliyah known as the "Aliyat Talmidei HaGra" led by his disciple Rabbi Menachem Mendel of Shklov. Initially, they settled in Safed and established the Perushim community there. From the year 5576 AM (1816 CE), some of them moved to Jerusalem and re-established the Ashkenazi community there.

== Opposition to Hasidism ==
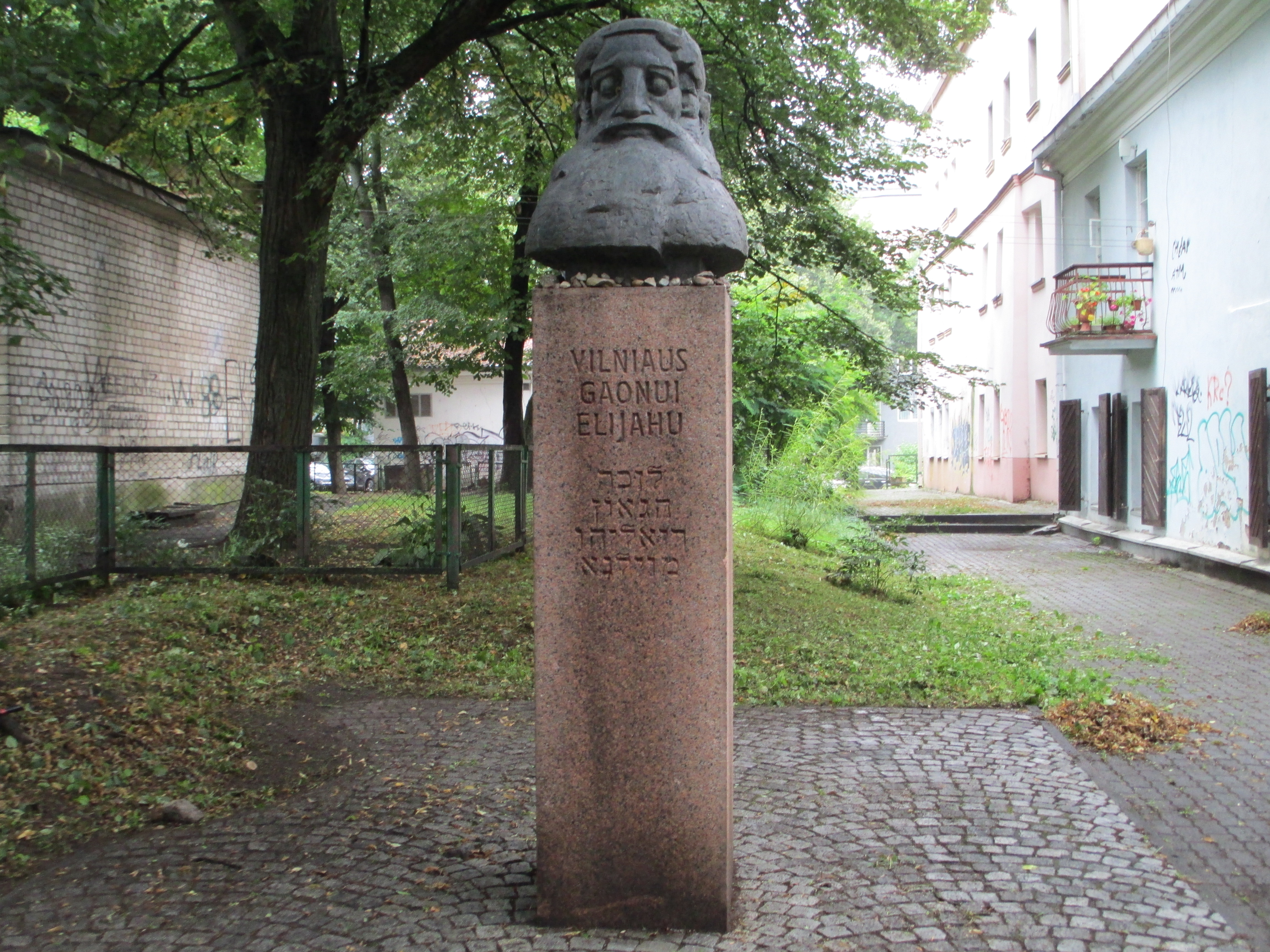
A statue of the Vilna Gaon where his house once stood in Vilnius

The Vilna Gaon opposed the Hasidic movement due to various distortions he saw in it, which led him to classify it as heresy and a movement stemming from impurity. As early as the year 5532 AM (1772 CE), the Gaon's signature appeared on the excommunication decree of the Vilna community against Hasidism. In the year 5541 AM (1781 CE), he issued another excommunication. He refused to meet with the founder of the Chabad Hasidic movement, Rabbi Shneur Zalman of Liadi, and instructed that the book Tzavaat HaRivash be publicly burned.

There are various opinions regarding the distortions the Gaon saw in Hasidism. Shimon Dubnov argued that Hasidism threatened the communal structure of the rabbinic Jewish faith by placing emotion before reason, in addition to concerns that it was a new messianic movement rising against Judaism. Others argued that Hasidism was perceived as a frivolous movement that mocked Torah scholars who opposed it, accompanied by actions viewed as lighthearted, such as disrespect for prayer times, standing on one's head, and more. Rabbi Joseph Dov Halevi Soloveitchik of Boston added that the Gaon saw Hasidism spreading rapidly, which caused him to fear that it was "the work of Satan," as holiness usually spreads slowly.

Some claim that the opposition stemmed from the Gaon's belief that Hasidism contained elements that differed from the Jewish faith as it had been accepted until then. In a letter from the Gaon, he referred to Hasidism as the worship of wood and stone, a statement that indicates the theological aspect of his opposition to Hasidism, identifying it as deviating from the fundamentals of Jewish faith. He may have meant the oversimplification of complex Kabbalistic ideas, such as the presence of God in the physical world and the existence of "Nitzotzot" (holy sparks) in the world, even in simple things like trees and stones, for the purpose of "clarifying the sparks," a central concept in Hasidic thought. There may also be a hint to his suspicions that Hasidism continued or resembled dangerous heresy and antinomianism, as seen in the Shabbatean and Frankist movements.

In a letter from Rabbi Shneur Zalman of Liadi to his followers in Vilna, he mentions that the Gaon's opposition to him stemmed from a disagreement on defining the presence of God in the physical world.

== His students ==
The Vilna Gaon did not have students in the usual sense of the word and did not serve as the head of a yeshiva. However, in the winter of 1767, he established a beit midrash adjacent to his home, where he occasionally gave lectures, primarily in his youth, and where select Torah scholars studied. They would present their questions and doubts before him. His students felt the immense gap between themselves and him and refused to be called his "students". The Gaon's sons, in the introduction to the Gaon's commentary on the Shulchan Aruch, compiled a list of some of his distinguished students:

- Rabbi Chaim of Volozhin – Considered his greatest student, he established the Volozhin Yeshiva, the central yeshiva in Europe, and wrote the book Nefesh HaChaim, in part as a response to the Hasidic movement.
- Rabbi Shlomo Av Beit Din of Vilkomir
- Rabbi Shlomo Zalman of Volozhin – Brother of Rabbi Chaim.
- Rabbi Shlomo of Tolchin – One of his first students to immigrate to Israel while the Gaon was still alive.
- Rabbi Saadia – Brother-in-law of Rabbi Shlomo Zalman of Volozhin, a leader of the Aliyah of the Gaon's Students. He served the Gaon and wrote down his conduct, which was later published in the book Maaseh Rav, and was his emissary in the struggle against Hasidism.
- Rabbi Moshe Shlomo of Tolchin – A preacher in the community of Vilna, a close disciple of the Gaon in Kabbalah, and an editor of some of his writings.
- Rabbi Tzvi Hirsch of Smiatits.
- Rabbi Shlomo of Mohilev.
- Rabbi Benjamin Rivlin.

The Gaon's sons write that in his later years, two brothers from Shklov, Rabbi Binyamin and Rabbi Menachem Mendel, came closer to him:

- Rabbi Menachem Mendel of Shklov served the Gaon during his last two years and was one of the leaders of the Aliyah of the Gaon's Students to Israel, founding the Ashkenazi community in Jerusalem.
- Rabbi Menasha of Ilya – Author of the book "Alfei Menashe." Known for his work in science and original philosophical views.
- Rabbi Jacob Kahana – Son-in-law of Rabbi Yissachar Ber, the Gaon's brother.
- Rabbi Pinchas ben Yehuda Altshul (Pinchas of Płock) – A preacher, author of several books.
- Rabbi Menachem Mendel – Author of the book "Tammim Yachdav," a preacher in the community of Ponevezh.
- Rabbi Israel of Shklov – Served the Gaon during the last six months of his life, one of the leaders of the Aliyah of the Gaon's Students, author of the book Peat HaShulchan and a commentary on Tractate Shekalim, and an editor of several of the Gaon's works.
- Rabbi Hillel Rivlin of Shklov, son of Rabbi Benjamin – One of the immigrants in the aliyah of the Gaon's Students in 1832. The book Kol HaTor is attributed to him, although some claim he was not a student of the Gaon.
- Rabbi Yehuda Leib Halevi Adel of Slonim – An expert in Hebrew grammar who assisted the Gaon in writing his books.
- Rabbi Chiel Michal of Minsk

== His writings ==
The teachings of the Vilna Gaon were published in books covering many areas of Torah, including commentaries on the Torah, the Prophets, the Megillot, the book of Chronicles, Mishnahs from Zeraim and Taharot, explanations of the Jerusalem Talmud, Tosefta, Minor Tractates, Torat Kohanim, and more. In the realm of Kabbalah, his teachings include commentaries on parts of the Zohar, Sifra de-Tzeniuta, Heikhalot, and the Sefer Yetzirah, among others. The Vilna Gaon also frequently explained Midrashim through the lens of Kabbalah.

According to the words of Rabbi Israel of Shklov, it is believed that the Gaon wrote all his works up to the age of 40 (except for the glosses on all of the Talmudic literature). After this, he lectured to his students or dictated his teachings to them. In Rav Israel's introduction to Pe'at HaShulchan he writes:

"And I could not refrain from informing a wondrous true story […]

At the time he finished his commentary on Shir HaShirim (Song of Songs), his mind was cheerful, and he rejoiced in the joy of his holy Torah […] He commanded that his room be closed, and the windows were shut during the day, and many candles were lit. And when he finished his commentary, he lifted his eyes to the heavens with intense devotion, in blessing and thanksgiving to His great Name, may He be blessed, who granted him the merit to attain the light of the entire Torah – in its inner and outer aspects […] After that, he said that, thank God, the entire Torah that was given at Sinai—he knew to its ultimate end, and how all the Prophets and Writings and the Mishnahs and the Oral Torah are embedded within it. And there no longer remained any doubt for him in any law or subject in the entire Torah in his old age. He knew all of the Oral Torah and all the legal decisors up until the most recent ones on the Shulchan Aruch, and he clarified them and corrected light from the darkness of errors, and made them like fine flour, clean of dross. And in the hidden teachings—all that we have: the Zohars and the Tikkunei Zohar and Midrash Ne’elam and the writings of the Arizal, and the Pardes—he completed and knew them to their ultimate ends, cleansed of the dross of many errors, in which thorns had grown, and he corrected them with proofs clear as the sun. Only two serious matters in the hidden teachings of the Zohar remained difficult for him, and he said before Him: "Where is their place?" And had he known someone who knew them, he would have walked on foot to him and waited for that—for our righteous Messiah.

And with that, he concluded."

The bibliographer Isaiah Winograd compiled a complete book Treasury of the Vilna Gaon's Books in which he gathered all the Vilna Gaon's works in their editions as they were printed until the year 5758 AM (1998 CE). Some of his books have recently been edited in a clearer and annotated form by Rabbi Shlomo Bravda.

His student, Rabbi Chaim of Volozhin, writes:

"Even if the generation merits that all of his holy writings be spread, nevertheless, only a small part of his vast wisdom and knowledge will be seen, and none will fully comprehend it. But know and believe that there is no limit to his understanding, wisdom, and knowledge, which is as vast as the sea. And just as a drop is compared to the vast ocean, so too are his writings compared to his abundant wisdom."

== His family ==
The Vilna Gaon was the eldest of his siblings and had four brothers:

- Rabbi Moshe, preacher and Mo"tz in the town of Podzelova near Vilkomir
- Rabbi Abraham, author of "Ma'alot HaTorah", preacher in Shklov and rabbi in Rogula, died on 4 Nisan 1804
- Rabbi Yitzhak Ber, one of the prominent scholars of Vilna, authored several books, died on 9 Elul 1806. His son-in-law was Rabbi Yaakov Kohen a student of the Gaon
- Rabbi Meir, from the community of Yanushuk, whom the Gaon referred to as "The Light that Shines"

All eight of the Vilna Gaon's children were born to his first wife, Chana:

- Daughter (name unknown) (1741–1756), died in her youth
- China (1748–1806), married Rabbi Zalman Zelig Chinitz of Pinsk and after his death married Rabbi Moshe of Pinsk, who printed several of his father-in-law's books
- Pesia Batya (born 1750), married Tzvi Hirsch Donchin of Dissna
- Daughter (name unknown) (born 1752), married Yizchak Eliezer Halevi
- Shlomo Zalman Vilner (1759–1780)
- Yehuda Leib Vilner (1764–1816)
- Rabbi Abraham Ben HaVilna Gaon (Abraham Vilner) (1765–1808)
- Taube (1768–1812), married Rabbi Uri Shraga Feibush of Doberovne

Among his more notable descendants in recent times is Rabbi Eliyahu Landa.

== Commemoration ==
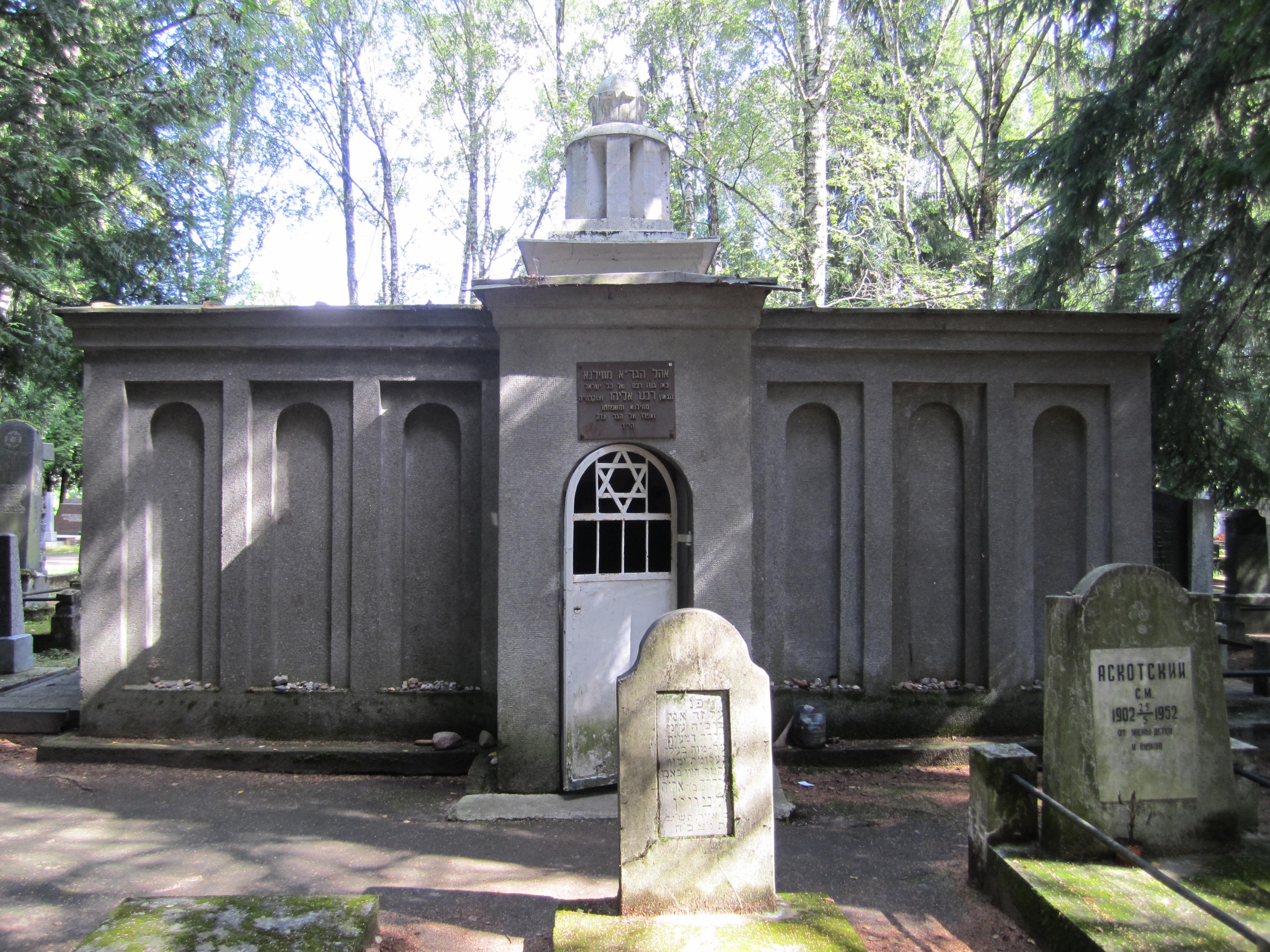
The tomb of the Vilna Gaon and Abraham ben Abraham

Synagogues have been established in the name of the Vilna Gaon, particularly in the Shaarei Chesed neighborhood in Jerusalem. In addition, Yeshivat HaGra (now Kollel Avrechim) in Haifa, Yeshivat Aderet Eliyahu and Kehillat Aderet Eliyahu in the Old City of Jerusalem were founded in his name, aiming to follow his path.

Portraits of the Vilna Gaon began to be published as lithographs between 1821 and 1825. The original artist was the head of the lithographic department at the University of Vilna, the Lithuanian-Polish artist Joseph Hilary Globzicki.

In 1999, the Government of Israel requested to bring the Vilna Gaon's remains to Israel, but the request was denied by the Lithuanian government, partly due to the opposition of the Jewish community there.

The year 2020, marking the 300th anniversary of the Gaon's birth, was declared by the Lithuanian Parliament the Year of the Vilna Gaon and the Year of Jewish History. In the same year, the Vilna Gaon Museum of Jewish History in Lithuania was named in his honor.

== See also ==
- Hasidim and Misnagdim
- Lithuanian Jews
- Perushim
- Vilna Gaon Jewish State Museum
- Yechezkel Landau

== Bibliography ==
- Ackerman, C. D. (trans.) Even Sheleimah: the Vilna Gaon looks at life (Targum Press, 1994) ISBN 0-944070-96-5
- Etkes, Immanuel, et al. (2002). The Gaon of Vilna: the man and his image (University of California Press) ISBN 0-520-22394-2
- Etkes, Emanuel (1989). "The Gaon of Vilna and the Haskalah movement", by Emanuel Etkes, reprinted in Dan, Joseph (ed.). Studies in Jewish thought (Praeger, NY) ISBN 0-275-93038-6
- Freedman, Chaim. Eliyahu's Branches: The Descendants of the Vilna Gaon (Of Blessed and Saintly Memory) and His Family (Avotaynu, 1997) ISBN 1-886223-06-8
- "The mystical experiences of the Gaon of Vilna", in Jacobs, Louis (ed.). Jewish mystical testimonies (Schocken Books, NY, 1977) ISBN 0-8052-3641-4
- Landau, Betzalel and Rosenblum, Yonason. The Vilna Gaon: the life and teachings of Rabbi Eliyahu, the Gaon of Vilna (Mesorah Pub., Ltd., 1994) ISBN 0-89906-441-8
- Rosenstein, Neil. The Gaon of Vilna and his Cousinhood (Center for Jewish Genealogy, 1997) ISBN 0-9610578-5-8
- Schapiro, Moshe. Journey of the Soul: The Vilna Gaon on Yonah/Johan: an allegorical commentary adapted from the Vilna Gaon's Aderes Eliyahu (Mesorah Pub., Ltd., 1997). ISBN 1-57819-161-0
- Shulman, Yaacov Dovid. The Vilna Gaon: The story of Rabbi Eliyahu Kramer ( C.I.S. Publishers, 1994) ISBN 1-56062-278-4
