= Kol HaTor =

Kol HaTor (Hebrew: קול התור, "The Voice of the Turtledove", from Song of Songs 2:12) is a book of Jewish thought attributed to Rabbi Hillel Rivlin of Shklov, a disciple of the Vilna Gaon. Many historians suggest that it was in fact written by Moshe Zalman Rivlin in the middle of the 20th century. The text deals with the Geulah (Era of eschatology and salvation) and describes its signs vis-a-vis an evaluation of a proposed 999 footsteps of the Moshiach's arrival. The Vilna Gaon believed the number 999 to be intrinsically connected to the idea of Moshiach ben Yosef, he also felt that this number is alluded to in the gematria of his own name.

== Publication history ==
Kol HaTor was first published in Hebrew in 1947 by Rivlin, and again in 1968 by Rabbi Menachem Mendel Kasher.

According to Rabbi Pinchas Winston,

"In 1947, Rabbi Shlomo Rivlin, with the advice of the great Kabbalists of Jerusalem, decided to publish an abridged version of this lengthy and difficult treatise keeping the Kabbalistic terminology as simple as possible so that it could also be studied by non-Kabbalists. Therefore, the printed Kol HaTor is not the original text. In 1968 it was reprinted again by two different editors (unknown to each other), Rabbi Menachem Kasher and Rabbi Chaim Friedlander (Committee For The Dissemination of Kol HaTor). Rabbi Kasher omitted the chapter on the confluences of Kabbalah and science called Sha'ar Be'er Sheva (Gate of The Seven Fields of Wisdom). The B'nei Brak edition, which did contain this chapter, was out of print for over twenty years, thus making this "lost doctrine" of the GR"A [the Vilna Gaon] totally unnoticed by scholars and the public. Only recently a new print has appeared in Jerusalem with the Sha'ar Be'er Sheva."

== Impact and controversy ==
The text has become popularized amongst the adherents of Religious Zionism who perceive parallels between current and recent historical events and those forecast in the book. They maintain that we are currently in the years right prior to the full Redemption and that the indicators established in Kol HaTor are currently being manifested. However, most historians and some anti-Zionists have disputed the authenticity of Kol HaTor. According to Prof. Immanuel Etkes, "Shlomo Zalman [Rivlin] concocted the myth attributing a Messianic Zionist doctrine to the Gaon of Vilna and his disciples, and describing the immigration of the Prushim to the Land of Israel in the early nineteenth century as an aliya that was fundamentally motivated by a Messianic Zionism. All of these statements have, as said," no support in the contemporaneous sources."

Moshe Sternbuch is a direct descendant of the Vilna Gaon and is the rabbi of the Gra Synagogue in the Har Nof neighborhood of Jerusalem, which primarily follows the traditions taught and espoused by the Vilna Gaon. Sternbuch argues against the work on theological grounds as well as textual grounds by drawing attention to certain words in the text that only a speaker of modern Hebrew would utilize. He first wrote against Kol HaTor in a ten-page pamphlet in the year following its publication in 1968 and later expanded upon the matter in his work Teshuvos VeHanhagos.
