= Tolchin =

Tolchin is a surname derived from the name of the town of Tulchyn, Ukraine.

Notable people with the surname include:

- Jonah Tolchin (fl. from 2012), American musician
- Martin Tolchin (1928–2022), American journalist
- Sidney Tolchin, U.S. Navy officer after whom Mount Tolchin is named
- Susan Tolchin (1941–2016), American political scientist
