= Yitzchak Shlomo Zilberman =

Israeli rabbi and educator (1929–2001)

Rabbi Yitzchak Shlomo Zilberman
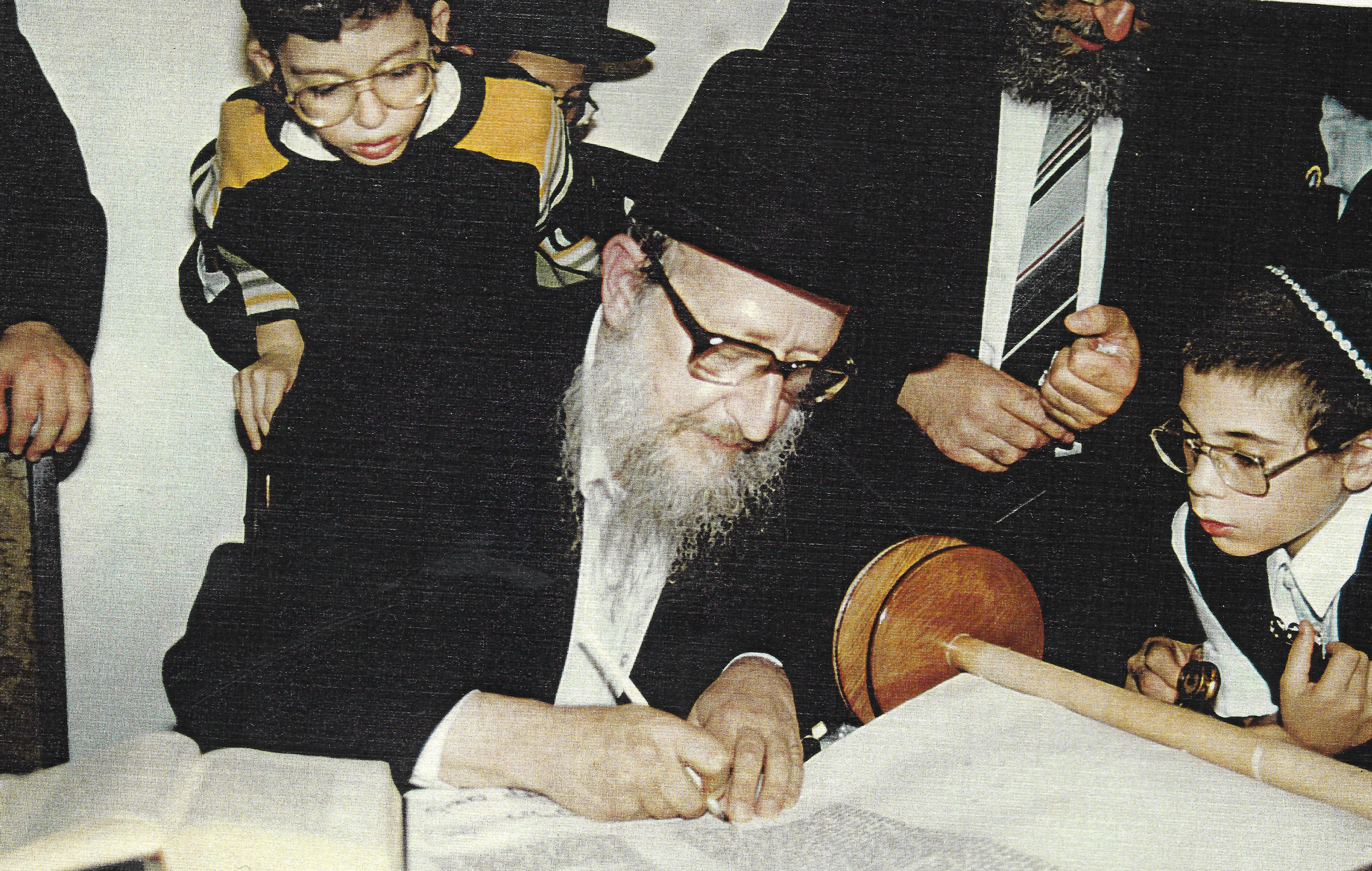

Personal life
- Born: April 30, 1929 Berlin, Germany
- Died: March 13, 2001 (aged 71) Jerusalem
- Spouse: Shaindel Zlotnick
- Children: Yom Tov, Avraham Moshe, Eliyahu, Yirmiyahu, Yehoshua, Yosef, Yehiel, Nahum, Ephraim, Rachel, and 8 other daughters.
- Parents: Rabbi Dr. Avraham Moshe Zilberman (father); Rivka Levy (mother)
- Education: Kol Torah
- Occupation: Educator (Zilberman Method)

Religious life
- Religion: Judaism
- Denomination: Haredi Judaism
- Profession: Sofer

Jewish leader
- Position: Founder
- Yeshiva: Yeshivat Aderet Eliyahu
- Yahrtzeit: 18 Adar

Yitzchok Shlomo Zilberman (Hebrew: יצחק שלמה זילברמן; 30 April 1929 – 13 March 2001) was an Israeli Haredi rabbi and educator, pioneer of the Zilberman Method of Torah study. He founded Yeshivat Aderet Eliyahu, part of a community that follows the path of the Vilna Gaon.

== Early life ==
Yitzchok Shlomo Zilberman was born in Berlin, Germany to Rabbi Dr. Avraham Moshe Zilberman, translator of the Tanakh into German, and Rivka, née Levy. His mother died when he was 3 years old, and he was raised by his father. In 1934, in response to the coming to power of Adolf Hitler, Zilberman escaped with his father, brother, and sister to England.

In 1939, after his father died, Zilberman caught the last boat leaving England for Palestine before the war halted sea traffic, and he made aliyah. He went to live with his uncle Yaakov Levy in Rehavia, Jerusalem, the director of the labor ward at Bikur Cholim Hospital. He studied at the Horev Yeshiva, and continued his education at Kol Torah under the watchful eye of Rabbi Dr. Yechiel Michel Schlesinger. He later went on to study in the Mir Yeshiva.

Lacking the guidance of a father figure, Zilberman struggled in his youth to find an appropriate spiritual path within Orthodox Judaism to which he could relate. He first experimented with Hasidic Judaism, in particular Chabad and Breslov, before eventually adopting the stance of the Perushim of the Sha'arei Hesed neighbourhood, followers of the Vilna Gaon.

== Educator ==
Zilberman began his teaching career as a tester at Kolel Shomrei HaChomos. In the 1960s, he was instrumental in founding the Kaminetz and Hadar Zion Talmud Torahs, but his maverick teaching style caused him difficulties, which ultimately led to a parting of ways with those institutions. During this time, Zilberman became active as a sofer, in order to avoid deriving benefit from Torah scholarship.

=== Zilberman Method ===
In the beginning of the 1980s, after having had limited success with incorporating his teaching style in existing institutions, Zilberman founded, with the help of his sons, Yeshivat Aderet Eliyahu, in the northern part of the Jewish Quarter of Jerusalem. The school, also known as "Zilberman's Cheder", adopted its founder's method, and became an inspiration for many of his students, who later branched out all over the country founding schools with the same teaching approach.

The Zilberman Method was not a new innovation, but rather a return to an ancient form of Torah study elucidated in the Mishna and Talmud, and favoured by both the Maharal and the Vilna Gaon. In Pirkei Avos 5 it states, "A 5-year-old [learns] the Torah, a ten-year old [learns] the Mishna, a 15-year-old [learns] the Talmud." In Shabbat 63a it states, "A man should recite, and only later expound." This is in contrast to standard procedure in the Torah world, where intense scrutiny of the text at a relatively young age is favoured over the covering and committing to memory of vast amounts of material. Zilberman also instituted that school sessions be continued on Shabbat and Jewish holidays, albeit at a reduced schedule.

Zilberman's life work was favoured by Shlomo Zalman Auerbach and the Tchebiner Rav.

Zilberman kept the practice of donning his tefillin all day, and so encouraged his students. In normative practice, the tefillin are removed after Shacharit.

Zilberman was one of the first rabbis to promote the usage of tekhelet, and encouraged his students and family to make use of the dye in their tzitzit. He encouraged his students to get married young, based upon a teaching in Pirkei Avot Chapter 5.

== Family ==
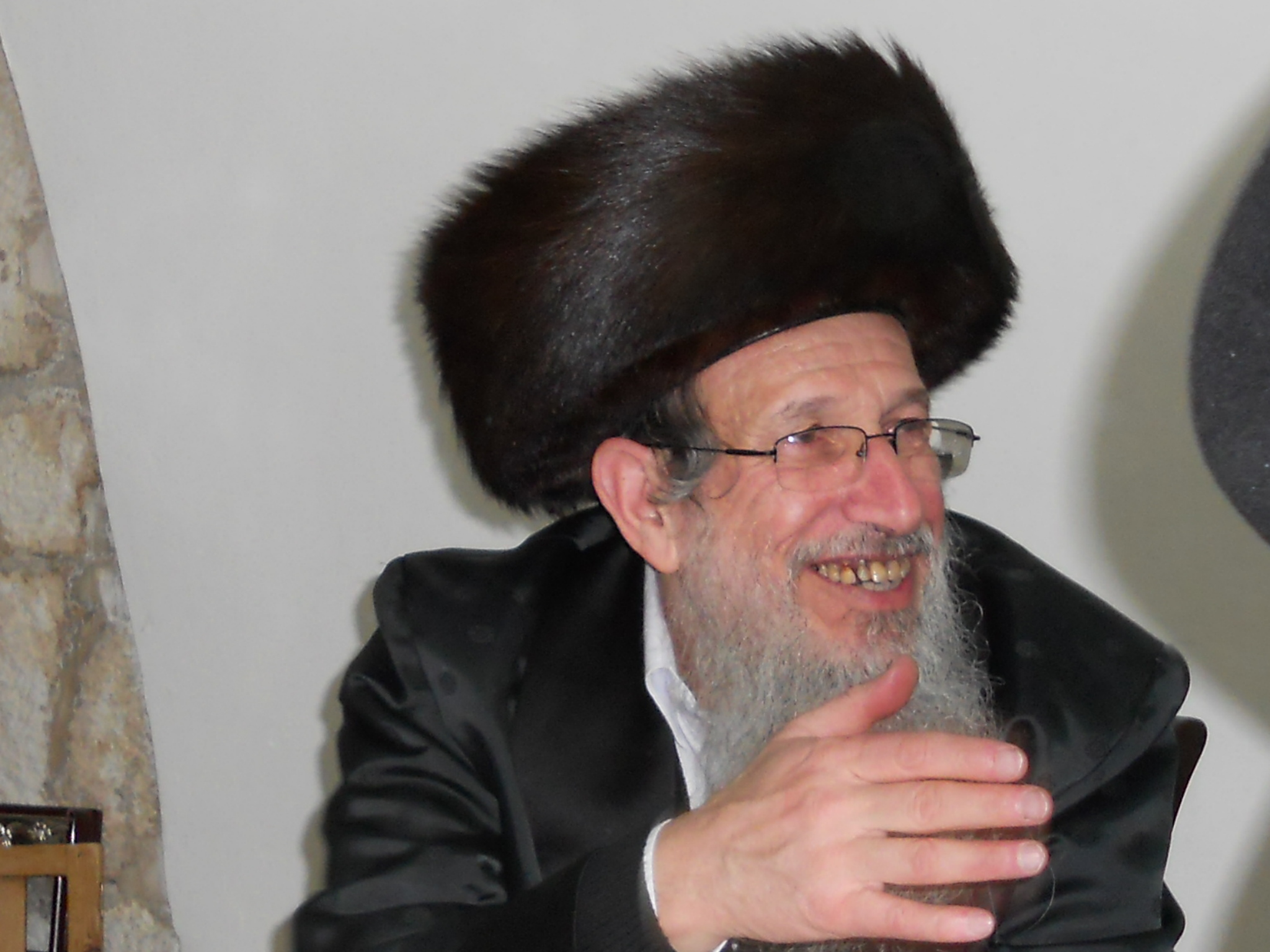
Zilberman's eldest son, Yom Tov Zilberman

Zilberman married Sheindel, the daughter of Yom Tov Zlotnick of Jerusalem, who bore him 9 sons and 9 daughters. All of his sons and sons-in-law are involved in Torah education.

Zilberman's daughter Rachel Weiss and her three sons were killed in the Jericho bus firebombing.

In 1991, Zilberman moved to the Jewish Quarter, to be in close proximity to his institutions. One year later, his wife died. He remarried in 1998.

Zilberman died in 2001 after contracting an illness. He was buried in the Mount of Olives Jewish Cemetery.

== Legacy ==
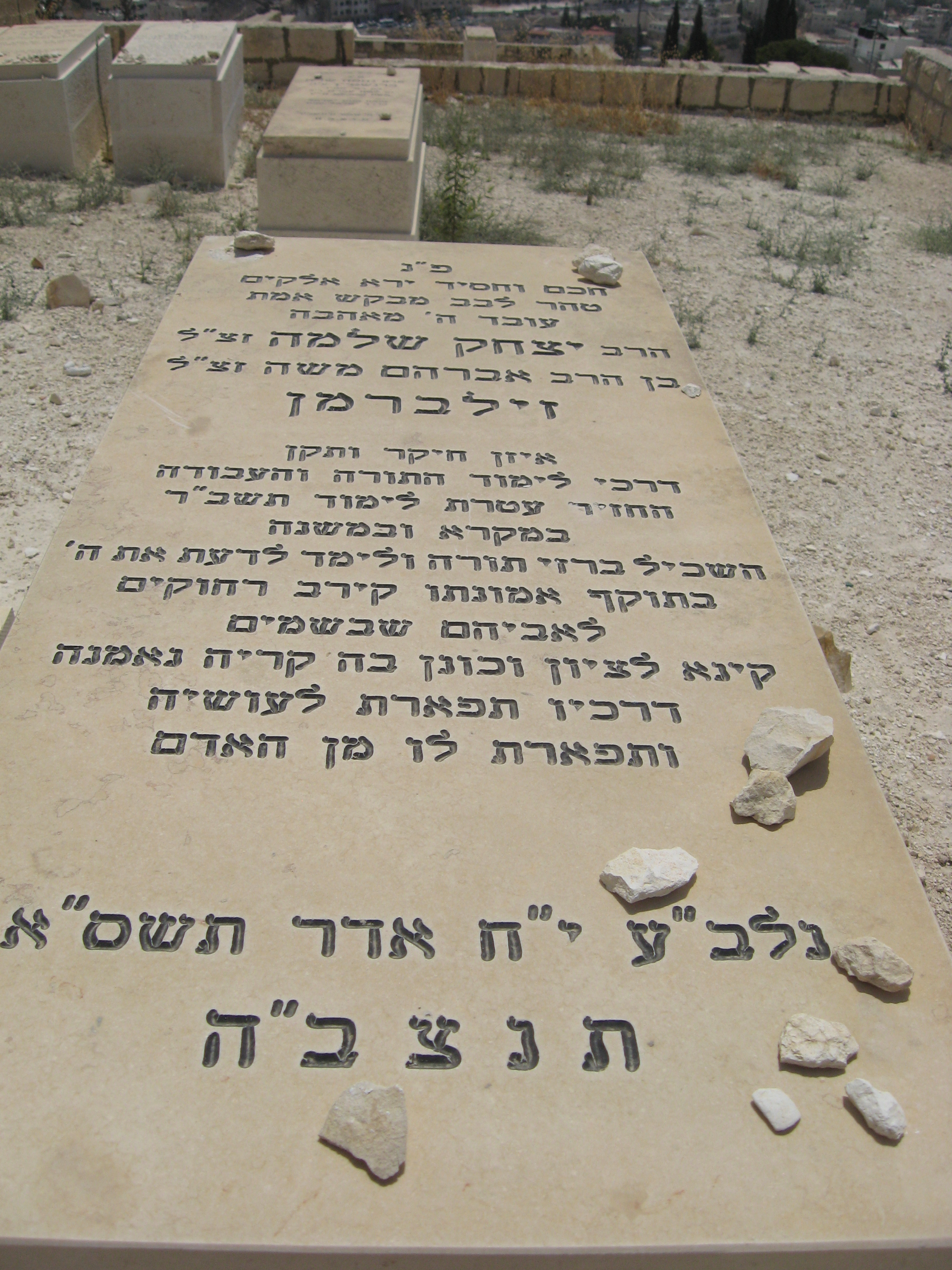
Zilberman's grave in the Mount of Olives Jewish Cemetery

There are approximately 20 Torah institutions throughout Israel that adhere to Zilberman's teaching principles, and 3 internationally.

Zilberman was the rabbi who influenced Israeli comedian Uri Zohar to become a baal teshuva (returnee to Judaism). Zohar would go on to have an enormous impact on a generation of spiritually ambivalent Israeli Jews. Another student, Yitzhak Pindrus, is a politician affiliated with the United Torah Judaism party.

In March 2010, students from Zilberman's yeshiva in the Jewish Quarter were tasked with running the day-to-day operations of the newly reconstructed Hurva Synagogue. In June 2010, some of those students, known as Zilbermanim, were accused of causing difficulties for tourists wishing to gain access to the synagogue.
