= Yeshivat Aderet Eliyahu =

- ישיבת אדרת אליהו
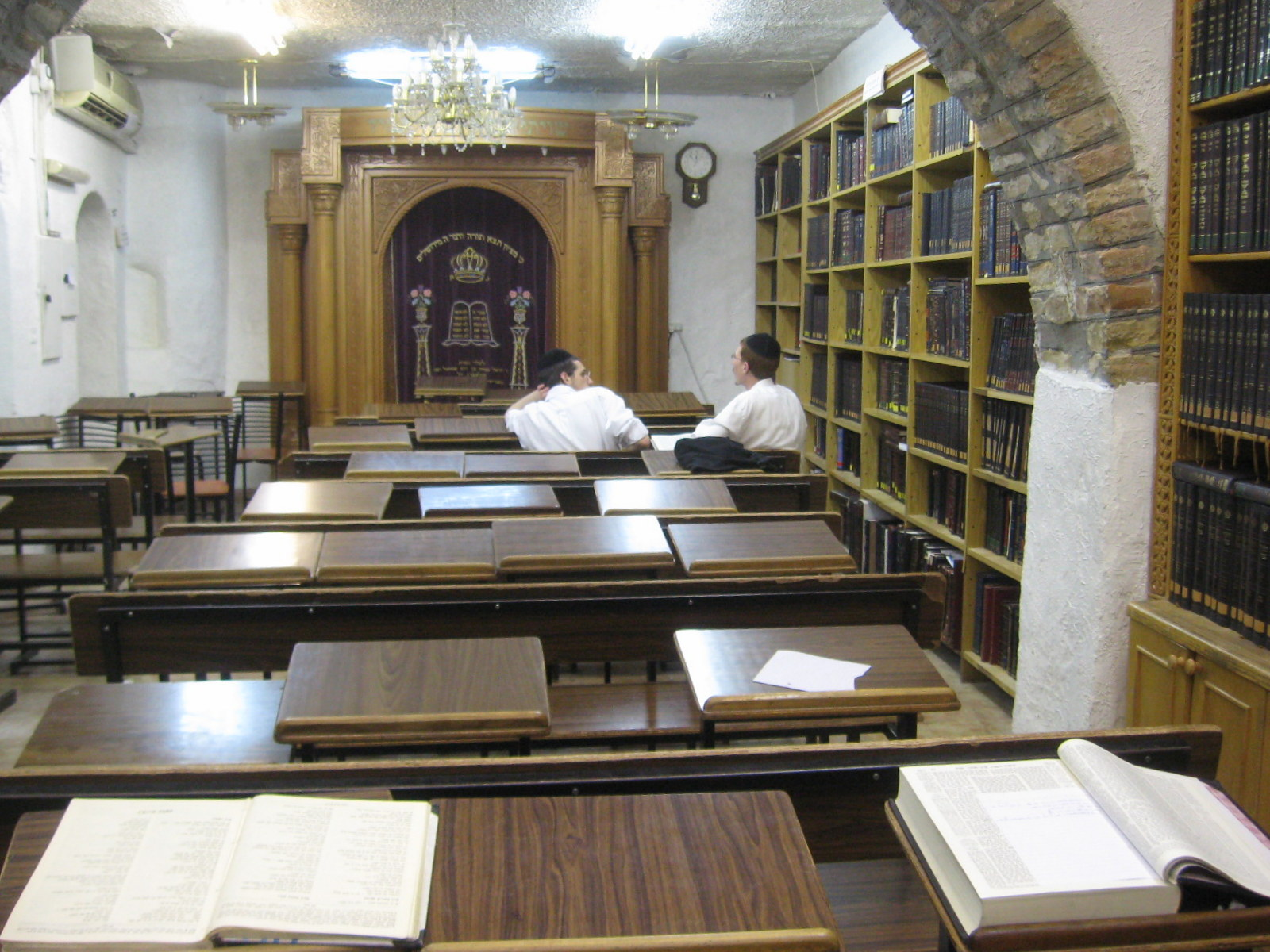

Location
- Old City of Jerusalem
- 31°46′40.62″N 35°13′52.54″E

Information
- Other name: Zilberman's
- Type: Yeshiva
- Religious affiliation: Haredi Judaism
- Established: 1982
- Founder: Yitzchak Shlomo Zilberman
- Education system: Zilberman Method
- Campus type: Urban
- Nickname: Zilbermanim
- Website: oldcitycheder.org

Yeshivat Aderet Eliyahu (Hebrew: ישיבת אדרת אליהו, commonly referred to as "Zilberman's") is a Haredi Lithuanian-style educational institution located in the Old City of Jerusalem. If follows the teachings of the Vilna Gaon and utilises the Zilberman Method, a unique pedagogic system of Torah study.

== History ==
Arriving as a 10-year-old orphan in Mandatory Palestine in 1939, Yitzhak Shlomo Zilberman struggled to find an appropriate spiritual path within Orthodox Judaism to which he could relate. He first experimented with Hasidic Judaism, in particular Chabad and Breslov, before eventually adopting the stance of the Perushim of the Sha'arei Hesed neighbourhood, followers of Eliyahu ben Shlomo Zalman, otherwise known as the Vilna Gaon. In 1982, he founded Yeshivat Aderet Eliyahu and its yeshiva ketana in the Gaon's spirit. After Zilberman's death in 2001, his sons took over the leadership and management positions of the yeshiva.

== Focus ==
Although in many ways a traditional Haredi yeshiva, Zilberman's differs from other yeshivas in two ways: Through its commitment to following the teachings of the Vilna Gaon, and for its unique pedagogical system known as the Zilberman Method. This is a simpler, more straightforward teaching method for Talmud and the Bible. Returning to traditional teaching methods no longer in vogue in other yeshivas, students of Zilberman's have a set study schedule including Torah, "Nach" (Prophets and Writings), Mishnah and Talmud; the method of Talmud study does not involve intense scrutiny of commentaries, but instead has more focus on the text itself.

Zilberman's is known for endorsing the newly found techelet (blue dye extracted from sea snails and used to color fringes of tzitzit) as authentic and encouraging its students to wear tzitzit dyed with it. Wearing tefillin (phylacteries) throughout the day is also encouraged, unlike most yeshivas where tefillin is only worn briefly for the morning prayer.

Despite its own strong right wing and nationalistic leanings (many of its younger students are affiliated with or sympathetic towards the Hilltop Youth settler movement), Zilberman's is firmly Haredi. Zilberman's adheres to Avigdor Nevenzahl's ban on entering the Temple Mount. The Yeshivat Aderet Eliyahu community as a whole are known as Zilbermanim.

== Campus ==
Located in the Old City of Jerusalem, the yeshiva consists of three institutions: The main beis midrash (study hall) in the Galicia Courtyard, situated between the Jewish and Muslim Quarters); a yeshiva high school near the Armenian Quarter; and a yeshiva ketana (elementary school or cheder) known as Zilberman's Cheder. In 2022, Rabbi Eliyahu Zilberman, grandson of Rabbi Yitzchak Shlomo Zilberman and Rosh Yeshiva of Aderet Eliyahu, was appointed rabbi of the Hurva Synagogue, essentially making the synagogue one of their institutions as well.

== Derivative schools ==
Many new schools have been established throughout Israel and in Jewish communities abroad based on Zilberman's model. Known as Zilberman Schools, some of these schools do not share Zilberman's Haredi, ultra-Orthodox character, as many are associated with the National Religious and settler movements. Three of these schools were founded by Zilberman's own students; one in Beit El (dedicated to Binyamin Kahane), one in Yitzhar and one in Hebron—now administered by Baruch Marzel. The largest, the Beit El yeshiva, has nearly 250 students as of September 2007.
