= Messiah ben Joseph =

Messiah in Jewish eschatology

In Jewish eschatology Messiah ben Joseph or Mashiach ben Yoseph (Hebrew: מָשִׁיחַ בֶּן־יוֹסֵף Māšīaḥ ben Yōsēf), also known as Mashiach bar/ben Ephraim (Aram./Heb.: מָשִׁיחַ בַּר/בֶּן אֶפְרַיִם Māšīaḥ bar/ben Efrayīm), is a name for a Jewish messiah, believed to be from the tribe of Ephraim and a descendant of Joseph. The figure's origins are much debated. Some regard it as a rabbinic invention, but others defend the view that its origins are in the Torah.

== Messianic tradition ==
Jewish tradition alludes to four messianic figures, called the Four Craftsmen, from a vision found in the Book of Zechariah. The four craftsmen are discussed in the Babylonian Talmud. Hana bar Bizna, attributed to Simeon the Just, identifies these four craftsmen as Messiah ben David, Messiah ben Joseph, Elijah, and the Righteous Priest. Each will be involved in ushering in the Messianic age.

Rashi's commentary on the Talmud gives more details. He explains that Messiah ben Joseph is called a craftsman because he will help rebuild the temple. Nahmanides also commented on Messiah ben Joseph's rebuilding of the temple. The roles of the Four Craftsmen are as follows. Elijah will be the herald of the eschaton. If necessary, Messiah ben Joseph will wage war against the evil forces and die in combat with the enemies of God and Israel.

According to Saadia Gaon the need for his appearance will depend on the spiritual condition of the Jewish people.

In the Apocalypse of Zerubbabel and later writings, after his death a period of great calamities will befall Israel. God will then resurrect the dead and usher in the messianic age of universal peace. Messiah ben David will reign as a king during the period when God will resurrect the dead. With the ascendancy of Rabbinic Judaism, the Righteous Priest has largely not been the subject of Jewish messianic speculation.

== Sources in chronological order ==
=== The Dead Sea Scrolls ===
While the Dead Sea Scrolls do not explicitly refer to a Messiah ben Joseph, a plethora of messianic figures are displayed.

- The poly-messianic Testimonia text 4Q175 presents a prophet like Moses, a messianic figure and a priestly teacher. The Text contains four testimonia. The fourth testimonium is about Joshua and is generally viewed as non-messianic. However Alan Avery-Peck suggests that given its placement the text concerning Joshua should be read as referencing a war messiah from Ephraim. It is dated to the early 1st century BCE.
- 4Q372 (c. 200 BCE) features a suffering, 'Joseph' king-figure, who having sinned in setting up a competing Temple to that in Jerusalem, cries out to God in his death-throes as 'My father', citing the Psalms 89 and 22, and predicts that he will arise again to do justice and righteousness.
- 1QS lists a Messiah of Israel, a prophet and a priestly Messiah of Aaron. 1QS dates from around 100 BCE.

=== Gabriel's Revelation ===
Gabriel's Revelation is a stone tablet with its text written in ink. Although the inscription is in a poor state of preservation, the meaning of the legible text is still a matter of scholarship.

The text seems to talk about a messianic figure from Ephraim who will break evil before righteousness by three days. Later the text talks about a "prince of princes" a leader of Israel who is killed by the evil king and not properly buried. The evil king is then miraculously defeated. The text seems to refer to Jeremiah Chapter 31. The choice of Ephraim as the lineage of the messianic figure described in the text seems to draw on passages in Jeremiah, Zechariah and Hosea. However, Matthias Henze suggests that this figure is not a reference to the Messiah ben Joseph who he believes is a later development but rather a pseudonym for the Messiah ben David and that Ephraim is simple a metonym in reference to Israel; Israel Knohl disagrees.

The text seems to be based on a Jewish revolt recorded by Josephus dating from 4 BCE. Both Josephus and Gabriel's Revelation describe three messianic leaders. Based on its dating, the text seems to refer to Simon of Peraea, one of the three leaders of this revolt.

=== Testaments of the Twelve Patriarchs ===
The Testaments of the Twelve Patriarchs, thought by some to be a Christian writing or if Jewish to have had Christian influences. The Testaments of the Twelve Patriarchs is a composition of twelve texts one for each patriarch. The Testament of Benjamin was probably expanded later to include a reference to Messiah ben Joseph by Jewish sources. The Testament of Joseph on the other hand was probably altered by Christians to read that the virgin born Lamb of God from the tribe of Judah rather than the lamb son of Joseph would conquer.

=== Talmud ===
- In the Jerusalem Talmud Brachot 2:4, 5a an Arab tells a Jew that the messiah is born. His father's name is Hezekiah and he will be named Menahem. He is not referred to as the Messiah ben Joseph. However some have linked this passage to Messiah ben Joseph. Selling his cow and plough he buys some swaddling cloth and travels from town to town. He travels to Bethlehem where the child is born. All the women are buying their children clothing except Menahem's mother. She says her son is an enemy of Israel because he is born on the day the second temple was destroyed. He tells her that if she does not have money today she can pay later. He says that the child is surely the messiah who will rebuild the temple. When he returns she tells him that Menahem has been carried by a divine wind up to heaven. He will later return as Israel's messiah.
- In the Babylonian Talmud Sanhedrin 98b Menahem ben Hezekiah is also mentioned along with a list of other names of the messiah suggested by different rabbis. Again he is not referred to directly as the Messiah ben Joseph. Menahem's name translates as "the comforter". The Rabbis also called the messiah the leper scholar, using a pun related to a disciple of Rabbi Judah ha-Nasi who was smitten by leprosy.
- Babylonian Talmud Sukkah 52a records of a dispute between Rabbi Dosa ben Harkinas and other unnamed rabbis. Rabbi Dosa takes Zechariah 12:10 to apply to the mourning for Messiah ben Joseph, while the rabbis think the mourning is for the evil inclination. The talmudic redactor sides with Rabbi Dosa: the mourning is for Messiah ben Joseph. (Mourning the Evil Inclination, he adds, would be absurd.) It then speaks of how Ben Joseph's death frightens Messiah ben David, so that he urgently prays for his life to be spared.
- The Jerusalem Talmud Sukkah 5:2 also mentions Messiah ben Joseph.
- Babylonian Talmud Sukkah 52b presents the Four Craftsmen. Each may have a role to play in the ushering in the messianic age they are listed as Elijah, Messiah ben David, Righteous Priest and Messiah ben Joseph.

The Talmud uses the Hebrew ben rather than the Aramaic bar when giving the lineage of these messiahs, suggesting a date before 200 CE. Other parts of the passage are Aramaic confusing the matter. The similarity between 4Q175 and the Four Craftsman suggest that the Messiah ben Joseph probably existed in some form by the early 1st century BCE.

=== Targum ===
Targumim were spoken paraphrases, explanations, and expansions of the Jewish scriptures that a Rabbi would give in the common language of the listeners.

The common Targum for Zechariah 12.10 is non-messianic. However, in the Jerusalem Targum to Zechariah 12.10, Messiah bar Ephraim is slain by Gog. In the Islamic era Targum Pseudo-Jonathan to Exodus 40.9-11, three messiahs Messiah ben David, Messiah ben Ephraim and Elijah are listed. Messiah ben Ephraim's death is not mentioned. The Targum on Song of Songs 4.5 compares Messiah ben David and Messiah ben Ephraim to Moses and Aaron. All of these Targumim refer to Messiah ben Ephraim rather than Messiah ben Joseph Dating of these Targumim is difficult. Dating earlier than the fourth century CE cannot be affirmed. The same is true for many of the Midrashim.

=== Sefer Zerubbabel ===
Sefer Zerubbabel, also called the Book of Zerubbabel or the Apocalypse of Zerubbabel, is a medieval Hebrew apocalypse written at the beginning of the 7th century in the style of biblical visions (e.g. Daniel, Ezekiel) placed into the mouth of Zerubbabel. It narrates the struggle between Armilus and the Messiah whose name is Nehemiah ben Hushiel ben Ephraim ben Joseph. He will proceed Menahem ben Ammiel identified as the future Messiah ben David. Armilus is thought to be a cryptogram for Heraclius and the events described in the Sefer Zerubbabel coincide with the Jewish revolt against Heraclius. The Sefer Zerubbabel mentions Gog and Armilos rather than Gog and Magog as the enemies. In the Sefer Zerubbabel a celestial Temple is built in heaven and then lowered to earth.

=== Otot HaMashiah "Signs of the Messiah" ===
Another medieval Hebrew apocalypse, the Otot HaMashiah or "Signs of the Messiah", also casts Nehemiah ben Hushiel as the Messiah ben Joseph. It gives a less historically linked account but is also thought to be dated to the beginning of the 7th century.

The following texts all mention Nehemiah as the Messiah ben Joseph. They are all similar to the Otot HaMashiah. The texts all contain ten signs of the coming of the Messiah. Nehemiah will confront Armilus with a Torah scroll in all of them. The texts are The Secrets of Rabbi Shimon ben Yohai and Ten Signs

=== The Secrets of Shimon bar Yohai ===
Dated after the fall of the Umayyad Caliphate in the 8th century, the midrashic The Secrets of Rabbi Simon ben Yohai is generally positive towards Islam. Messiah ben Joseph will rebuild the temple but be killed in battle with Armilus. Armilus is described as bald having a leprous forehead and small eyes.

=== Midrash ===
Messiah ben Joseph is established in the apocalypses of later centuries and the midrash literature.

- Pesikta de-Rav Kahana 5:9 here the four craftsmen are listed as Elijah, the King Messiah, Melchizedek and the Anointed for War.
- Song of Songs Rabbah also lists the four craftsmen. Here they are listed as Elijah, the King Messiah, Melchizedek and the Anointed for War.
- Pesikta Rabbati 15.14/15 likewise the four craftsmen are listed as Elijah, the King Messiah, Melchizedek, and the Anointed for War. Pesikta Rabbati references an Ephraim Messiah rather than a Messiah ben Ephraim. It has been argued that this text may not refer to the Messiah ben Joseph but rather to the Messiah ben David.
- Genesis Rabbah In 75:6 the blessing on Joseph from Deuteronomy 33:17 is applied to the War Messiah later in 99:2 we are told that the War Messiah will be a descendant of Joseph.
- Pirkei De-Rabbi Eliezer, like the Apocalypse of Zerubbabel, refers to Menahem ben Ammiel. He is referred to as the son of Joseph. In others editions the name Menahem son of Ammiel son of Joseph is omitted and the text simple refers to the son of David. According to the Zohar and Apocalypse of Zerubbabel, Menahem is the Messiah ben David. The Pirke de-Rabbi Eliezer is often thought to have had Christian and Muslim influences. The text is often dated from the eighth or ninth century.
- The Isawiyya were an important Jewish sect founded by Abu Isa and sometimes linked with the rise of Shia Islam. Al-Shahrastani appears to have identified with the Isawiyya. The writer of Pirke De-Rabbi Eliezer is also thought by some to have identified with the Isawiyya. The description Al-Shahrastani gives of Abu Isa is very similar to the one given to Menahem ben Ammiel in Pirke De-Rabbi Eliezer. Thus it has been suggested that Abu Isa may have thought himself the Messiah ben Joseph.
- In Saadia Gaon's description of the future Emunoth ve-Deoth: viii Messianic redemption, dating from the early 10th century. Messiah ben Joseph will appear in the Upper Galilee prior to the coming of Messiah ben David; he will gather the children of Israel around him, march to Jerusalem, and there, after overcoming the hostile powers, reestablish Temple worship and set up his own dominion. Similarities with the Sefer Zerubbabel suggest that it is likely that Saadia Gaon knew of that work. After going over this sequence of events Saadia Gaon states that Messiah ben Joseph will only need to appear if Israel does not repent. If needed Messiah ben Joseph will rectify the conditions of the nations. He could be like one who purges with fire the grave sinners among the nations. Or for those who have committed lesser infractions, he would wash away those sins with lye.
- In Tanna Devei Eliyahu, the four craftsmen are listed the same as in the Talmud as Elijah, Messiah ben David, Righteous Priest and Messiah ben Joseph.
- Alphabet of Akiba ben Joseph like the Pesikta Rabbah, refers to an Ephraim Messiah.
- In a responsum about Redemption Hai Gaon also asserts that Messiah ben Joseph will be found in Upper Galilee.
- Midrash Tehillim also refers to the Messiah ben Ephraim.
- The Midrash Aggadat ha-Mašiah is part of the larger compilation the Lekah Tov. The Lekah Tov was compiled around the turn of the eleventh century in Byzantium. Messiah ben Joseph is described as building the temple. He seemed to have been given priestly functions, as he also offers sacrifices. again Messiah ben Joseph will be found in the Upper Galilee where Israel will assemble.
- Also from the eleventh century the Midrash Wayosha mentions Messiah ben Joseph.
- Numbers Rabbah 14.1 here the Righteous Priest has been replaced. The four craftsmen are listed as Elijah, Redeemer from David, War Messiah from Ephraim, Messiah from Manasseh.
- Yalkut Shimoni 569 lists the four craftsmen as Elijah, Messiah ben David, Righteous Priest and Messiah ben Joseph.
- Tanhuma: the War Messiah is again a descendant of Joseph.
- Bet ha-midrash is a compilation of Midrashim by Adolf Jellinek in two Midrashim it is stated that the War Messiah is again a descendant of Joseph.

The event surrounding Messiah ben Joseph's death vary. Different accounts give different enemies Armilus, Gog and Magog. After his death what happens to his corpse also varies. His corpse, according to one group, will lie unburied in the streets of Jerusalem. According to the other, it will be hidden by the angels with the bodies of the Patriarchs, until Messiah ben David comes, when God will resurrect him (comp. Jew. Encyc. i. 682, 684 [§§ 8 and 13]; comp.).

=== Zohar ===
Following the apocalyptic battles the Messiah enters a pillar of fire which will hide him for twelve months. Some view this figure as the Messiah ben Joseph who has been killed. The text in the Zohar probably does not reflect Moses de Leon's views. The suffering messiah was marginal in his Hebrew writings. Several of the Zohar Mishpatim mention Messiah ben Ephraim.

=== Kol HaTor ===
The Kol HaTor, attributed to Rabbi Hillel Rivlin, deals at length with the Messiah ben Joseph and his role in bringing back the exiles and rebuilding the Land of Israel. The Kol HaTor states that Joshua is the ancestor of Messiah ben Ephraim. Joshua was the first to wage war against Amalek. Messiah ben Joseph will likewise wage war against Amalek.

== Ten Lost Tribes ==
Throughout the Hebrew bible Ephraim is often used to refer collectively to the northern kingdom. Ephraim was the leading tribe in the north. It has been claimed that Messiah ben Joseph does not represent the leader of the Ten Lost Tribes and that he is never presented as such. Rather he is presented as the leader of all of Israel. However some later Jewish sources do explicitly call the Messiah ben Joseph the leader of the Ten Lost Tribes such as the case with RambaN (Nachmanides) in his commentary to Genesis 48:16 where is also stated that "Ephraim" is a name designated for the Ten Tribes whose leader is the Messiah son of Ephraim:

"AND LET MY NAME BE CALLED ON THEM. Rabbi Abraham ibn Ezra said that it means that all Israel be called by the name Ephraim, just as they are called “the children of Abraham, Isaac, and Jacob.”

This is not correct for Scripture uses the word bahem (on them), [thus referring to both Ephraim and Menasheh], and they were not called by the name of Menasheh. But perhaps this is because they were called the house of Joseph.

The correct interpretation though is that their race and their name will exist forever, and the name of Abraham, Isaac and Jacob will forever be upon them.".

Mikweh Israel was written by the 17th-century kabbalist Menasseh Ben Israel. The text deals at some length with the author's theory that parts of the ten tribes can be found among the Native Americans. In the text the author calls the Messiah ben Joseph the future leader of the ten lost tribes.

In his commentary on Ezekiel 37 the Malbim also says that the Messiah ben Joseph will be the leader of the Ten Lost Tribes when they return. The Messiah ben Joseph will initiate union with Judah, who will be led by the Messiah ben David. Later, the Messiah ben Joseph is killed and Messiah ben David will rule over all Twelve Tribes.

== Jewish understanding ==
Judaism rejects the original sin doctrine of Christians. It is taught that each Jewish individual is responsible to follow the 613 mitzvot to the best of their abilities, for each Jew has individual blessings and tests by God. Non-Jews are encouraged to keep the Seven Laws of Noah. When korbanot ("sacrifices") were offered in ancient times they were offered according to Jewish halakha in the tabernacle and the temple in Jerusalem. Traditionally by way of example, Jews offer vidui ("confessions"), prayers (sacrifices of the lips, "Forgive all iniquity, and accept that which is good; so will we render for bullocks the offering (Korban) of our lips." Hosea 14), ethical civilisation, and tzedakah a form of charity. Traditionally most common among Ashkenazi Jews, some perform kapparot as a form of tzedakah. On Yom Kippur God judges each individual yearly.

If Messiah ben Joseph is killed it is not considered a sacrifice but rather a tragedy that will befall Israel proceeding the eschaton. Neither Messiah ben Joseph nor Messiah ben David will remove the requirement to keep the 613 mitzvot.

== Kabbalah ==
=== Ecstatic Kabbalah ===
Abraham Abulafia was the founder of Ecstatic Kabbalah. He linked the messiah with the month of Tammuz, the month of the sin of the golden calf. Abulafia referred to himself as "the seventh day" and the true Messiah ben David. He claimed to be both the Messiah ben David and a Kohen like Melchizedek. He supported this by claiming that his father was of Judah), his mother of Levi and his wife of the Kohen. He also identified himself as the priestly angel Metatron.

He also seems to have linked messiah with the concept of Messiah ben Joseph, referring to him as "the sixth day" and as Satan. According to 10th-century legend, the Antichrist would be the offspring of a virgin and the devil, and the 11th-century CE Midrash Vayosha describes "a monstrosity" anti-Messiah figure which will be defeated by the Mashiach ben Yoseph to come. Being Gog's successor, his inevitable destruction by "Messiah, son of Joseph" symbolizes the ultimate victory of good over evil in the Messianic age.

Abulafia set out on a messianic mission to Rome to convert the Pope to Judaism. Pope Nicholas III ordered him burned at the stake. However the day before he entered Rome (August 22. 1280 CE), the Pope died of an apoplectic stroke. Abulafia claimed to have killed the Pope by invoking the name of God.

In one of his later works Abulafia claimed to have been driven mad by Satan but that God had protected him. He claimed that Elijah brought him to Messina where he completed the Otzar Eden HaGanuz. He wrote that but for accidents and fantasies his seven disciples would not have been driven away from him. He hoped that one in particular Rabbi Saadia ben Yitzchak Sanalmapi who he dedicated the work to would forgive him.

Abulafia's writings were condemned by his local Jewish congregation and were not used in Spanish schools. His meditation techniques would influence many later writings and are still studied today. Later writers would marginalize Abulafia's messianic elements. In Ecstatic Kabbalah Metatron is a messianic figure. This tradition predates Abulafia going back to the Book of Parables and 3 Enoch and other writings. The earlier Merkabah mysticism also references Metatron.

=== Lurianic Kabbalah ===
In Lurianic Kabbalah Adam incorporated all souls; it is possible for different soul-sections to be given to different people. In addition multiple people can share the same soul root. In the Kabbalistic understanding, the Righteous Priest would be reincarnated as Abel, Seth, Noah and Shem. Moses like Adam also incorporated all souls. Messiah ben Joseph was incarnated as Cain he was notably reincarnated as Joseph (son of Jacob) and Jeroboam. Messiah ben David was incarnated as Abel and David. Most of the Messiah ben Joseph claimants have been Kabbalists, or made by Kabbalists. In the Kabbalistic understanding this does not necessarily mean a literal claim of messiahship is being made.

== Academic views ==
The exact origins of Messiah ben Joseph are a matter of debate among scholars. It has been suggested that Messiah ben Joseph arose out of a Jewish collective memory of Simon bar Kokhba. Others suggest that his origins are older.

Some academic scholars have argued that the idea of two messiahs, one suffering, the second fulfilling the traditional messianic role, was normative to ancient Judaism, in fact predating Jesus. Early Christians (who were Jews) might have viewed Jesus as fulfilling this role.

== Other views ==
=== Traditional Christian ===
Traditional Christians do not believe in the concept of the Messiah ben Joseph or that Jesus Christ was descended from the tribe of Joseph. Instead, the Christian worldview holds that the Messiah ben Joseph is a rabbinic invention, composed in the Talmud centuries after Christ lived and after the New Testament of the Bible was formulated. As such, Christians do not see Jesus as a candidate for the Messiah ben Joseph. Rather, they believe that all the Messianic prophecies found within the Bible only refer to one Messiah. They therefore believe the conquering Messiah Ben David to be one and the same as the suffering Messiah that dies and resurrects. Further, they believe that Jesus completely fulfilled the role of the Messiah ben David, was of the tribe of Judah, and was a descendant of David. Additionally, in later medieval Jewish Midrash the enemy of the Messiah ben Joseph is Armilus, who is sometimes described as being the God and Messiah of the Christians, making him in this case identical to Jesus Christ, not only further differentiating the figure of the Messiah ben Joseph from Jesus, but also putting the Messiah ben Joseph into opposition to Jesus.

=== Christian Kabbalah ===
In some modern forms of Christian Kabbalah, based on Lurianic Kabbalah, Jesus is not literally the Son of God but rather a composite being like Adam. In other words, a full rectified Adam. In this understanding Jesus is linked with the title Son of Man given in the New Testament. Messiah ben Joseph is part of this entity.

In some Christian forms of Ecstatic Kabbalah Jesus is Metatron, Melchizedek, Messiah ben Joseph and Messiah ben David. Oftentimes, incompatible Kabbalists' teachings are blended together with Christian, new age and occult beliefs.

=== Latter-Day Saints (Mormons) ===
Some Latter-Day Saints (Mormons) in reverence of their prophet, associate Messiah ben Joseph with Joseph Smith, as he was named after his father, Joseph Smith Senior, and was believed to be "a pure Ephraimite".

With building the temple in Kirtland and later Nauvoo, faithful members of the church see him as the prophesied prophet of Restoration. He claimed that, in the Kirtland temple, he received keys to the sealing power of the priesthood from Elijah, one of the major revelations recorded in The Doctrine and Covenants.

A major doctrinal teaching of Joseph Smith was the gathering of Israel, especially the lost tribes.

When a mob stormed Carthage jail, Smith fired back with a six-barreled pistol. Smith and his brother Hyrum were killed in the skirmish.

For these reasons, outlier Mormons speculate Smith and his brother fulfilled the role of the Messiah ben Joseph.

== Messiah ben Joseph claimants ==
- Simon of Peraea (killed by the Romans in 4 BCE)
- Nehemiah ben Hushiel (Killed in Jerusalem 614)
- Abu Isal Isfahani C. 750 Jewish prophet who may have thought himself as the Messiah ben Joseph. He was the founder of the so-called Isawiyya, a Jewish rebellion around Khorasan against Abbasid Caliph al-Mansur after the latter's assassination of Abu Muslim al-Khorasani.
- Solomon Molcho (Killed in 1532) - a Portuguese-Jewish converso who returned to Judaism and sought to persuade Charles V to appoint him as commander of the Holy Roman Empire’s army against the Ottoman Empire, as part of a grand redemptive plan that would usher in the coming of the Messiah. He envisioned himself as the Messiah son of Joseph, destined to die in battle, after which the Messiah son of David would appear.
- Isaac Luria (1534–1572) Safed Kabbalists claimed that both Isaac Luria and Hayyim Vital were reincarnations of Messiah ben Joseph. However, the world was not yet ready for the coming of the messiah.
- Hayyim Vital (1543–1620) In a letter, a sequence of events starting in 1574 is laid out. He is named as the Messiah ben Joseph with Abraham Shalom as the Messiah ben David.
- Abraham Zalman picked by Shabbetai Tzvi as his Messiah ben Joseph died in the 1648 Chmielnicki massacres.
- Nehemiah HaKohen denounced Shabbetai Tzvi as a fraud. Declared himself to be the Messiah ben Joseph.
- Joshua Heschel Zoref (1633–1700): claimed to be Messiah ben Joseph, with Shabbetai Tzvi as the Messiah ben David.
- Abraham Miguel Cardoso (1626 – 1706) He was a follower of Shabbetai Tzvi. He proclaimed himself Messiah ben Joseph, although later in life he disavowed this claim.
- Judah Leib Prossnitz (1670–1750): claimed to be Messiah ben Joseph, with Shabbetai Tzvi as the Messiah ben David.
- Nachman of Breslov (1772–1810) His followers claimed that he was a reincarnation mostly of Messiah ben Joseph but also of Messiah ben David; it is unclear if he made this claim about himself.
- Theodor Herzl (May 2, 1860 – July 3, 1904) Rabbi Abraham Isaac Kook (1865–1935) Rav Kook gave a eulogy for Theodor Herzl who died at only forty-four. Rav Kook, not wanting to pay direct tribute to a secular Jew for Halakha reasons, instead deviated from a traditional Jewish eulogy and used various Jewish texts in his address while never giving direct tribute to Herzl. He wrote that Zionism could be symbolized as the "footstep of Messiah son of Joseph." He compared and contrasted secular Zionist to religiously observant Jews. Comparing the two as being of the "tree of Joseph" and "tree of Judah" respectively. He wished for the unification of the two trees and finally "This is the benefit to be gained by remorse over one whom we might consider the "footstep of Messiah son of Joseph", in view of his influence in revitalizing the nation materially and generally. This power should not be abandoned despite the wantonness and hatred of Torah that results in the expulsion of God-fearing Jews from the movement."

== See also ==
- Jewish Messiah claimants
- Jewish messianism

== Bibliography ==
- D.C. Mitchell, Messiah ben Joseph (Newton Mearns: Campbell, 2016).
- S. Hurwitz, Die Gestalt des sterbenden Messias: Religionspsychologische Aspekte der jüdischen Apokalyptik (Studien aus dem C.G. JungInstitut 8; Zürich–Stuttgart, 1958).
- Klausner, J. The Messianic Idea in Israel (London: Allen & Unwin, 1956; tr. from the 3rd Hebrew Edition).
- R. Smend, Alttestamentliche Religionsgesch.;
- W. Nowack, Die Zukunftshoffnung Israels in der Assyrischen Zeit;
- Hühn, Die Messianischen Weissagungen;
- Fr. Giesebrecht, Der Knecht Jahwe's in Deutero-Jesaia;
- Schürer, Gesch. 3d ed., ii. 29;
- W. Bousset, Die Religion des Judentums im Neutestamentlichen Zeitalter, part 3, ch. ii.-v.; part 6, pp. 474 et seq.;
- P. Volz, Jüdische Eschatologie von Daniel bis Akiba, §§ 34-35;
- H. J. Holtzmann, Lehrbuch der Neutestamentlichen Theologie, i. 68-85;
- W. Baldensperger, Die Messianisch-Apokalyptischen Hoffnungen des Judentums;
- F. Weber, Jüdische Theologie auf Grund des Talmud, etc., ch. xxii.-xxiii.;
- G. H. Dalman, Der Leidende und der Sterbende Messias;
- idem, Die Worte Jesu, pp. 191 et seq.;
- Kampers, Alexander der Grosse und die Idee des Weltimperiums in Prophetie und Sage;
- B. Beer, Welchen Aufschluss Geben die Jüdischen Quellen über den "Zweigehörnten" des Korans? in Z. D. M. G. ix. 791 et seq.
