= Righteous Priest =

Figure in rabbinic Jewish eschatology from the Book of Zechariah

In rabbinic Jewish eschatology, the Righteous Priest or Priest of Righteousness is a figure identified with one of the Four Craftsmen in a vision mentioned in the Book of Zechariah. He is found in the Talmud and Midrash.

== B. Sukkot 52b ==
According to Simeon Hasida, Zechariah's Four Craftsmen are Messiah ben David, Messiah ben Joseph, Elijah and the Righteous Priest. In the oldest full manuscript of the Talmud dating from 1342, known as the Munich Talmud, the Righteous Priest is referred to as Melchizedek. In his commentary on the Talmud, Rashi says the Shem/Melchizedek is called a craftsman because he helped his father build the ark and taught Abraham.

In 1280, following the Disputation of Barcelona, the Roman Catholic Church forced Jews to censor parts of the Talmud that were theologically problematic. The Talmud was censored again in 1564 following the invention of the printing press. Numerous times between 1239 and 1775, all copies of the Talmud were ordered destroyed; few survived.

== Shem ==
According to the Avot of Rabbi Natan on Gen. i 27, Adam was born circumcised because he was created in the image of God. While they were in Egypt, the children of Israel were not circumcised because they wished to follow the customs of the Egyptians. (Note: Exod Rabbah 1) The Israelites lived in Egypt for 210 years. According to Midrash Rabbah LVII. 4, Satan denounced Israel when they were in Egypt. Generally this is interpreted as happening after Joseph died and was because they stopped practicing circumcision. However the priestly tribe of Levi practiced circumcision in Egypt. (Note: Exod Rabbah 19) Entry into the land of Israel required the circumcision of all the tribes. (Note: Gen. Rabbah 46)

Noah, the second Adam, was also born circumcised. (Note: Midr. Agadah on Gen. vi. 9; Tan., Noaḥ, 6) Noah's son Shem likewise was born circumcised. He was the ancestor of Abraham, Isaac, and Jacob; he was also a priest, a prophet, and one of the eight righteous mentioned twice in Genesis xi 10; (Note: Gen. xi. 10) they were allotted a portion both in this world and in the world to come. (Note: Sanh. 69b; Tan., Yelammedenu, Noaḥ; Midr. ha-Gadol on Gen. ix. 18, xi. 10, ed. Schechter, cols. 142, 186) Shem is styled "the great one" (Note: "Shem rabba"; Sanh. 108b) According to Genesis R. xxx. 6, it was Shem who offered the sacrifices on the altar after Noah came out of the ark, (Note: comp. Gen. viii. 20) because Noah, having been crippled by a lion, was unfit for the priestly office. Noah gave the priestly garments, which he had inherited from Adam, to Shem. (Note: Num. R. iv. 6) Shem is extolled by the Rabbis for his filial devotion in covering his father's nakedness. (Note: Gen. ix. 23) Although his brother Japheth helped in this act, Shem suggested and began it; his brother did not arrive on the scene until Shem was already on his way with the garment. Noah, in blessing these two sons (Note: Gen. ix. 26) said, "blessed be the Lord, the God of Shem", giving special significance to Shem because Shem would be the forefather of the Jewish people.

=== Melchizedek as Shem ===
Melchizedek occupied an important place in ancient Judaism. In one of the Dead Sea scrolls 11Q13, he is presented as a semi-divine being. Josephus referred to Melchizedek as the first priest and as a Canaanite chief. Many scholars now believe that Israelite beliefs were an evolution of Canaanite beliefs. In Samaritan tradition, Melchizedek's city was near the temple on Mount Gerizim. Josephus followed the Jewish tradition and linked Salem with Jerusalem and Mount Zion.

The name Melchizedek translates as "king of righteousness". He also had priestly duties. Based on biblical life spans in the Masoretic text, Shem would have still been alive during Abraham's lifetime. The identification of Shem as Melchizedek is found in the Talmud, Targumim and Midrashim. Many Christian sources have said Shem was associated with Melchizedek for anti-Christian reasons. He was probably already associated with priesthood—if not Melchizedek—in pre-rabbinic times. Targums Targum Neofiti, Targum Pseudo-Jonathan, Targum Fragment P, Targum Fragment V all identify Shem as Melchizedek. The Book of Jubilees also says Shem was linked with priesthood. Similarly, Philo's writings exalt Shem. None of these documents contain antichristian polemics.

It is not known when Shem became associated with Melchizedek. By the fourth century CE, the identification of Shem with Melchizedek was well established. This was not limited to Jewish sources; Ephrem the Syrian also identifies Melchizedek as Shem.

== Early sources in chronological order ==
- The poly-messianic Testimonia text 4Q175 presents a prophet similar to Moses, a messianic figure and a priestly teacher. It is dated to the early 1st century BCE.
- 1QS lists a Messiah of Israel, a prophet and a priestly Messiah of Aaron. 1QS dates from around 100 BCE.
- Babylonian Talmud Sukkah 52b presents the Four Craftsmen. Each may have a role to play in the ushering in the messianic age they are listed as Elijah, Messiah ben David, Righteous Priest and Messiah ben Joseph.
- Pesikta de-Rav Kahana 5.9 here the four craftsmen are listed as Elijah, the King Messiah, Melchizedek and the Anointed for War.
- Avot of Rabbi Natan states that Messiah ben David is more beloved then the Priest of Righteousness it cites Psalm 110 linking the Priest of Righteousness with Melchizedek.
- Song of Songs Rabbah also lists the four craftsmen. Here they are listed as Elijah, the King Messiah, Melchizedek and the Anointed for War.
- Pesikta Rabbati 15.14/15 likewise the four craftsmen are listed as Elijah, the King Messiah, Melchizedek and the Anointed for War.
- In Tanna Devei Eliyahu the four craftsmen are listed the same as in the Talmud as Elijah, Messiah ben David, Righteous Priest and Messiah ben Joseph.
- Rashi referred to the Righteous Priest as Shem/Melchizedek in his commentary on the Talmud.
- Numbers Rabbah 14.1 here the Righteous Priest has been replaced. The four craftsmen are listed as Elijah, Redeemer from David, War Messiah from Ephraim, Messiah from Manasseh.
- Yalkut Shimoni 569 lists the four craftsmen as Elijah, Messiah ben David, Righteous Priest and Messiah ben Joseph.
- Melchizedek takes the place of the Righteous Priest in the Munich Talmud. The oldest full manuscript of the Talmud dating from 1342.

== Later writings ==
In Judaism, Shem and Melchizedek are one and the same. Shem plays an important role throughout Jewish literature beyond the role of the Righteous Priest. He is especially prominent in Kabbalah.

== Kabbalah ==
=== Ecstatic Kabbalah ===
Abraham Abulafia was the founder of Ecstatic Kabbalah. He identified Jesus as the Messiah ben Joseph, referring to him as "the sixth day" and as Satan. Abulafia linked Jesus with the month of Tammuz, the month of the sin of the golden calf. Abulafia referred to himself as "the seventh day" and the true Messiah ben David. He claimed to be both the Messiah ben David and a Kohen like Melchizedek. He supported this by claiming his father was of Judah, his mother of Levi, and his wife of the Kohen. He also identified himself as the priestly angel Metatron.

=== Lurianic Kabbalah ===
In Lurianic Kabbalah, Adam incorporated all souls; it is possible for different soul-sections to be given to different people. In addition, multiple people can share the same soul root. In the Kabbalistic understanding, the Righteous Priest would be reincarnated as Abel, Seth, Noah, and Shem. Moses like Adam also incorporated all souls. Messiah ben Joseph was incarnated as Cain; he was also reincarnated as Jacob's son Joseph and Jeroboam. Messiah ben David was incarnated as Abel and David.

== See also ==
- Teacher of Righteousness
- Tzadik
- Melchizedek priesthood
- Messiah ben Joseph

== Bibliography ==
- This article is an evolution of the corresponding article on Shem
- This article is an evolution of the corresponding article on Noah
