= Menahem ben Judah =

1st century CE Jewish Messiah claimant

Menahem ben Judah lived around the time of the First Jewish–Roman War and is mentioned by Josephus. He was the leader of a faction called the Sicarii who carried out assassinations of Romans and collaborators in the Holy Land.

He was the son of Judas of Galilee and grandson of Hezekiah, the leader of the Zealots, who had troubled Herod and was a warrior. When the war broke out, he attacked Masada with his band, armed his followers with the weapons stored there, and proceeded to Jerusalem, where he captured the fortress Antonia, overpowering the troops of Agrippa II. Emboldened by his success, he behaved as a king, and claimed the leadership of all the troops. Thereby, he aroused the enmity of Eleazar, another Zealot leader, and met death as a result of a conspiracy against him (ib. ii. 17, § 9).

Some identify him with Menahem the Essene, including Israel Knohl (English edition, 2001), who makes this identification from two purportedly messianic hymns from Qumran.

He may be identical with the Menahem ben Hezekiah mentioned in the Talmud (tractate Sanhedrin 98b) and called "the comforter that should relieve", and is to be distinguished from Menahem ben Ammiel, the Messiah of the Sefer Zerubbabel.
