= Hephzibah (disambiguation) =

Hephzibah or Hepzibah may refer to:

== People ==
- Hephzibah Menuhin (1920–1981), American-Australian pianist and human rights activist
- Hepzibah Swan, American socialite of late 18th- and early 19th-century Boston
- Hepzibah (or Hephzibah (Hezekiah’s wife)), a figure in the Second Book of Kings in the Bible

== Fictional characters ==
- Hepzibah (character), a character from the Marvel Comics universe
- Miss Mam'selle Hepzibah, a character from the comic Pogo
- Hephzibah “Eppie” Marner, a character from the novel Silas Marner
- Hepzibah Smith, a minor character in the Harry Potter novels
- Hepzibah Pyncheon, a main character in The House of the Seven Gables
- Hephzibah (warrior), a main character in the Apocalypse of Zerubbabel
- Hepzibah, Queen of the Witches on Bewitched
- Hepzibah, the given name of the Mother Superior on the Sister Boniface Mysteries series, season 3, episode 1, Christmas Special 2023.

== Locations ==
- Hephzibah, Georgia, United States
  - Hephzibah High School, in that town
- Hephzibah, Pennsylvania
- Hepzibah, Taylor County, West Virginia
- Hepzibah, Harrison County, West Virginia
- Hephzibah Jenkins Townsend's Tabby Oven Ruins, an archaeological site in South Carolina
- Heftziba, a kibbutz in northern Israel
