= Four horns and four craftsmen =

Symbolism in the Book of Zechariah

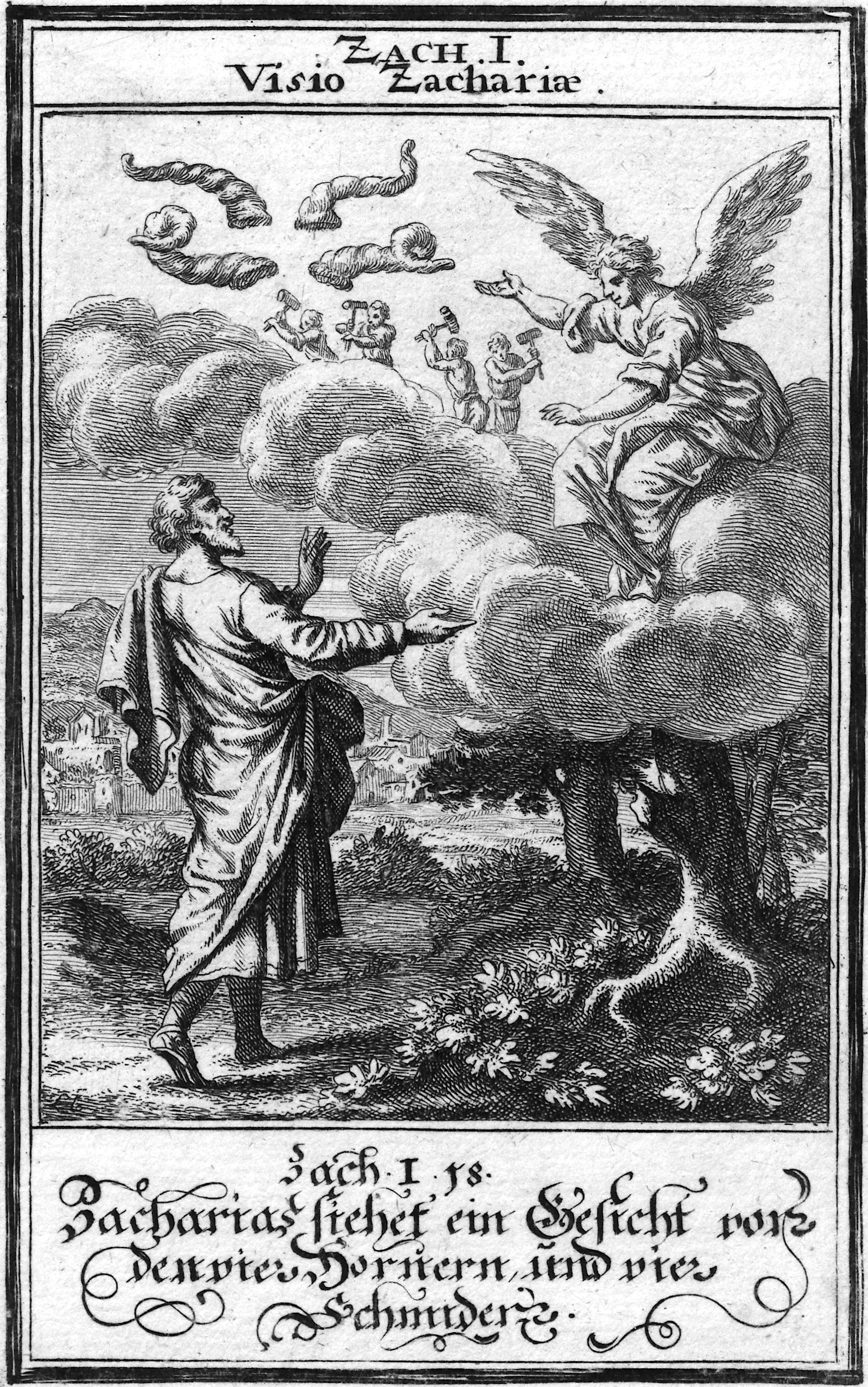
Zechariah's vision of the four horns and four craftsmen, by Christoph Weigel

The four horns (Hebrew: ארבע קרנות ’arba‘ qərānōṯ) and the four craftsmen (ארבעה חרשים ’arbā‘āh ḥārāšîm, also translated "engravers" or "artisans") feature in a vision found in the Book of Zechariah in the Old Testament. The passage is in Zechariah 1:18-21 in traditional English texts; in Hebrew texts, 1:18-21 is numbered 2:1-4. The vision precedes the vision of a man with a measuring line (Zechariah 2:1-5, or 2:5-9 in Hebrew texts).

== Hebrew Bible text ==
^{1} I looked up, and I saw four horns. ^{2} I asked the angel who talked with me, “What are those?” “Those,” he replied, “are the horns that tossed Judah, Israel, and Jerusalem.” ^{3} Then GOD showed me four smiths. ^{4} “What are they coming to do?” I asked. The angel replied: “Those are the horns that tossed Judah, so that nobody at all could raise their head; and these [smiths] have come to throw them into a panic, to hew down the horns of the nations that raise a horn against the land of Judah, to toss it.”

== In the Talmud ==
The four craftsmen are discussed in Babylonian Talmud Suk. 52b. Rav Hana bar Bizna attributed to Rav Simeon Hasida the identification of these four craftsmen as Messiah ben David, Messiah ben Joseph, Elijah, and the Righteous Priest. However David Kimhi interpreted the four craftsmen as four kingdoms.

== In later interpretation ==
The imagery of craftsmen is generally considered as "smiths", able to master the four iron horns, as symbolizing nations used as instruments of divine power for the destruction of Israel's enemies. The appearance of four horns "symbolises their universality".
