= Isawiyya =

Isawiyya may refer to:

- Isawiyya (brotherhood), an Islamic Sufi mystical brotherhood founded in Meknes, Morocco, by Sheikh al-Kamil Mohamed al-Hadi ben Issa (1465–1526)
- Isawiyya (sect), an apocalyptic Jewish sect founded by Abu Isa in the eighth-century CE in the Persian city of Isfahan
- Issawiya, a Palestinian neighborhood in East Jerusalem
