= Nehemiah HaKohen =

17th century Polish Sabbatean preacher and kabbalist

Nehemiah HaKohen (Hebrew: נחמיה הכהן) was a Polish Sabbatean preacher and kabbalist who lived in the 17th century.

== Life ==
Little is known about Nehemiah HaKohen's life. Owing to his wide knowledge of the Kabbalah, he was sent in 1666 by the Jewish communities of Poland to Gallipoli, where Sabbatai Zevi was at that time detained, in order that the latter's claim to being the Messiah might be investigated. Sabbatai Zevi was at first pleased with the arrival of Nehemiah; but after a long discussion, Nehemiah frankly declared him to be nothing else than an impostor. Sabbatai and his followers thereupon decided secretly to kill Nehemiah, but the latter detected their design, and ran into the street, shouting that he wished to embrace Islam. Immediately, the Islamic turban was placed on his head and he was declared to be a Muslim.

To the Jews, Nehemiah stated that his conversion was only temporary, in order to enable him to expose the pseudo-Messiah to the sultan. He was indeed sent by the governor to Adrianople and received by the sultan, who rewarded him for his acceptance of Islam; and, as a result of the information given by him concerning Sabbatai, the latter was brought under guard to the same city.

When Nehemiah later returned to his native country, he declared himself to be a fervent adherent of Zevi, relating wonders performed by the latter as the Messiah. Moreover, he pretended to be himself "Messiah ben Joseph", the precursor of the great Messiah. In consequence, the Polish communities excommunicated him.

Nehemiah then went to Germany, where he changed his mode of dress and used the name of Jacob. He was, however, recognized by his countrymen, and left the place. He then wandered from town to town till 1690, when he arrived at Amsterdam, old, half blind, and covered with rags; here also, despite the name Jacob, he was recognized.

According to another account, on his return to Poland, he became again a very pious Jew, passing his time in fasting; and even before going to the East he was regarded as a holy man and styled "the prophet." It is said that a certain beggar named Jacob Namirov, half mad but well versed in the Talmud, pretended or lived under the delusion that he was "Nehemiah the prophet," and wandered from one place to another under the latter's name until 1687, when he was recognized by his countrymen, who declared that the true "Nehemiah the prophet" had died in 1682.

Nehemiah died in Poland in 1682, or, according to another account, in Amsterdam shortly after 1690.
