= Menahem ben Ammiel =

Character in apocalyptic Jewish texts

Menahem ben Ammiel, or ben Amiel, is a character in apocalyptic Jewish texts, the future Messiah ben David of the Sefer Zerubbabel. He fights against Armilus.

He was born during the reign of king David. In some copies of the text, he is born on the day the First Temple is destroyed. A wind carried him to the city of Nineveh (representing Rome), where he remains waiting for the end days. He can be found at the “house of filth” near the market where he is imprisoned. He is presented as having a despicable, broken down image and to be in pain. His appearance is an illusion.

Some have suggested that Amiel is a cipher for Hezekiah and that he is the same as Menahem ben Hezekiah.

Pirke De-Rabbi Eliezer, like the Sefer Zerubbabel, refers to Menahem ben Ammiel. He is referred to as the son of Joseph. In others editions, the name Menahem son of Ammiel son of Joseph is omitted and the text simply refers to the son of David. According to the Zohar and the Sefer Zerubbabel, Menahem is the Messiah ben David.

== See also ==
- Messiah ben Joseph
