= Hephzibah (warrior) =

Female warrior in post-biblical Jewish lore

Hephzibah or Hepzibah (English: /ˈhɛfzɪbə/ or /ˈhɛpzɪbə/; Hebrew: חֶפְצִי־בָּהּ, Modern: ḥefṣī-bah, Tiberian: ḥep̄ṣī-ḇāh, my delight is in her) is a figure in the Apocalypse of Zerubbabel, who is also mentioned in the Zohar. She was the wife of Nathan, and the mother of Menahem ben Ammiel, a putative messiah.

According to the Apocalypse of Zerubbabel, Hephzibah was a female warrior who slayed multiple evil kings. Her military exploits occurred in connection with the Jewish revolt against Heraclius and the Sasanian conquest of Jerusalem. Many of the various versions of the Apocalypse of Zerubbabel describe divine actions assisting and foreshadowing Hephzibah’s military accomplishments, including the versions translated by Martha Himmelfarb and John C. Reeves.
