= Apocalypse of Zerubbabel =

Medieval Hebrew apocalypse

Sefer Zerubavel (Hebrew: ספר זְרֻבָּבֶל, romanized: Sēfer Zərubbāḇél), also called the Book of Zerubbabel or the Apocalypse of Zerubbabel, is a medieval Hebrew-language apocalypse written at the beginning of the seventh century AD in the style of biblical visions (e.g. Daniel, Ezekiel) placed into the mouth of Zerubbabel, the last descendant of the Davidic line to take a prominent part in Israel's history, who laid the foundation of the Second Temple in the sixth century BC. The enigmatic postexilic biblical leader receives a revelatory vision outlining personalities and events associated with the restoration of Israel, the End of Days, and the establishment of the Third Temple.

== History ==
The groundwork for the book was probably written in the Holy Land between 629 and 636, during the Byzantine–Sasanian War of 602–628 for control of the region. These wars touched Byzantine Palestine and stirred Messianic hopes among Jews, including the author for whom the wars appear to be eschatological events leading to the appearance of the Messiah. Armilus is thought to be a cryptogram for Heraclius, and that the events described in the Book of Zerubbabel coincide with the Jewish revolt against Heraclius.

However, firm evidence of the work's existence before the tenth century is elusive. The Zohar is cognizant of the legend of Hephzibah, whom the apocalypse first names as the mother of the Davidic Messiah and a female warrior credited with killing multiple evil kings. Saadia Gaon (892–942) and Hai ben Sherira (939–1038), both heads of the Talmudic academies of Babylonia, probably knew the book but never mention it by name.

The Book of Zerubbabel is extant in several manuscript and print recensions. What may be the oldest manuscript copy is part of a prayerbook reportedly dated to about 840 AD.

The first publication was in 1519 in Constantinople within an anthology called Liqqutim Shonim. It was reprinted again along with the Sefer Malkiel in Vilna in 1819, and again by Adolph Jellinek in his Bet Ha-Midrasch (1853–77) and S. A. Wertheimer in his Leqet Midrashim (Jerusalem, 1903). The fullest edition of the work was prepared by Israel Levi in his book L'apocalypse.

Because the book gave an unequivocal date (1058 AD) for the return of the Messiah, it exerted great influence upon contemporary Messianic thought. The book is mentioned by Eleazar of Worms and supposedly by Rashi. Abraham ibn Ezra criticized the book as "unreliable."

One edition of the Pirqe Hekhalot gave a figure of 890 years until the return of the Messiah, making the Messianic year 958 AD, within a decade of the birth of Saadia Gaon. That date perhaps led to a message sent by Rhenish Jews to Palestine inquiring after rumors of the Messiah's advent.

== Contents ==
The sefer describes the eschatological struggle between Armilus, who is the leader of Rome, and the Messiah ben Joseph, who fails in battle but paves the way for the Davidic Messiah and the ultimate triumph of righteousness. The original author expected the Messiah would come in the immediate future; subsequent editors substituted later dates.

Set after Nebuchadnezzar's destruction of Jerusalem, the book begins with Zerubbabel, whose name was associated with the first restoration, receiving a vision after praying for "knowledge of the form of the eternal house." In the vision he is transported by the angel Metatron to Ninevah, the "city of blood" representing Rome by which the author likely means Byzantium. There he finds in the marketplace a "bruised and despised man" named Menahem ben Ammiel who reveals himself to be the Messiah ben David, doomed to abide there until his appointed hour. Zerubbabel asks when the lamp of Israel would be kindled. Metatron interjects that the Messiah would return 990 years after the destruction of the Temple (approximately 1058 AD).

Five years prior to the coming of Hephzibah, who would be the mother of the Messiah ben David, the Messiah ben Joseph, Nehemiah ben Hushiel, will appear but he will be slain by Armilus. Afterwards, the Messiah ben David will resurrect him. The Sefer Zerubbabel mentions Gog and Armilus rather than Gog and Magog as the enemies.

In the narrative, Zerubbabel is led to a "house of disgrace" (a church), a kind of antitemple. There, he sees a beautiful statue of a woman. The statue gives birth to Armilus. Forces associated with Armilus and the antitemple come to rule over the entire world. But in the end, these forces are defeated. The work concludes with Zerubbabel's vision of the descent of the Heavenly Temple to earth. Thus, the "form of the eternal house" is revealed; unlike the Second Temple, it is made in heaven.

According to Martha Himmelfarb alongside a passage in the Tractate Berakhot 2.4 10ff in the Talmud Yerushalmi, dealing with the mother of the Messiah Menahem ben Ammiel, Sefer Zerubbabel is the only early Jewish text to import a mother of the Messiah into Judaism. In the Sefer Zerubbabel, Menahem is Menahem ben Ammiel, and his mother is Hephzibah, the same name as the wife of Hezekiah and mother of Manasseh. Hephzibah plays an important role as she finds and uses Aaron's rod.

== See also ==
- Jewish eschatology
- Midrash Vayosha
- The Secrets of Rabbi Simon ben Yohai
