= The Secrets of Rabbi Simon ben Yohai =

8th-century Jewish apocalyptic text

The Secrets of Rabbi Simon ben Yohai is a Jewish apocalypse, which presents itself as a record of the divine visions of the 2nd-century rabbi Simon ben Yohai. Scholarly opinion about the date of its composition is divided. Some say that it must date from the time of the crusades, others that it was composed in the mid-8th century.

The visions described in the secrets portrays the Ishmaelites being led by a violent saviour of the Jews from the hegemony of the Byzantine Empire. It describes the events and rulers of the eight-century Umayyad Empire, as well as eight-century battles between the Byzantines (known in the text as the Kenites or the Kingdom of Edom) and the Umayyads (known in it as the Kingdom of Ishmael). It also seems, in a later section, quite clearly to describe the Crusades.

According to the text, Simon ben Yohai was hiding from the Roman emperor. He took refuge in a cave, where he prayed continuously for forty days and forty nights. When Simon saw the Arab forces approaching, he expressed sadness, but was then immediately addressed by the angel Metatron:

When he saw the kingdom of Ishmael that was coming, he began to say: 'Was it not enough, what the wicked kingdom of Edom did to us, but we must have the kingdom of Ishmael too?' At once Metatron the prince of the countenance answered and said: 'Do not fear, son of man, for the Holy One, blessed be He, only brings the kingdom of Ishmael in order to save you from this wickedness. He raises up over them a prophet according to his will and will conquer the land for them and they will come and restore it in greatness, and there will be great terror between them and the sons of Esau.'

Suspicious, Simon asks Metatron how he can know that the Arabs are God's salvation. Metatron responds by claiming that they are fulfillment of prophecies of messianic deliverance, including Isaiah's prophecy of two riders and Zechariah's prediction that Israel's salvation will come riding on an ass. Nevertheless, the end of the prayer ultimately predicts that the Romans will take back Jerusalem.

== See also ==
- Jewish eschatology
- Midrash Vayosha
- Apocalypse of Zerubbabel
