= Armilus =

False messiah in Jewish eschatology

Armilus (Hebrew: ארמילוס; also spelled Armilos and Armilius) is an anti-messiah figure in medieval Jewish eschatology who will conquer the whole Earth, centralizing in Jerusalem and persecuting the Jewish believers until his final defeat at the hands of the Jewish Messiah. His believed destruction symbolizes the ultimate victory of the Jewish Messiah in the Messianic Age.

== Sources ==
The Sefer Zerubbabel is probably from the 7th century CE. Armilus is thought to be a cryptogram for Heraclius, a Byzantine emperor, and it is thought that the events described in the Sefer Zerubbabel coincide with the Jewish revolt against Heraclius.

The 11th-century Midrash Vayosha, which describes Armilus, was first published at Constantinople in 1519.

According to the Jewish Encyclopedia, Armilus is "a king who will arise at the end of time against the Messiah, and will be conquered by him after having brought much distress upon Israel." He is spoken of in the Midrash Vayosha, Sefer Zerubbabel and other texts. He is an adversary similar to Gog and Magog, and in some instances he is considered identical to Gog, but under another name. In the Sefer Zerubbabel he takes the place of Magog and defeats the Messiah ben Joseph.

The origin of this figure, said to be the offspring of Satan and a virgin, or Satan and a statue (or "stone"), is regarded as questionable by the Jewish Encyclopedia, due to the variation and clear relation (if not parody) to Christian doctrine, legend, and scripture. This reference to him being born of a virgin, evoking the Virgin Mary, would correlate with Jewish sources stating that he is seen by the Christians as their Messiah and as their God, further identifying him to Jesus Christ.

The Jewish Encyclopedia also links the figure to Roman mythology, comparing the story of his birth from a stone to a similar legend about a living statue attributed to Virgil, and the figure's name and conflict with the Messiah to an account in Eusebius' Chronicon in which a Roman leader (given the name Amulius or Armilus in various translations, but listed as a successor to Agrippa in the place of Romulus Silvius) wages war on Jupiter and is destroyed by a storm.

== Name ==
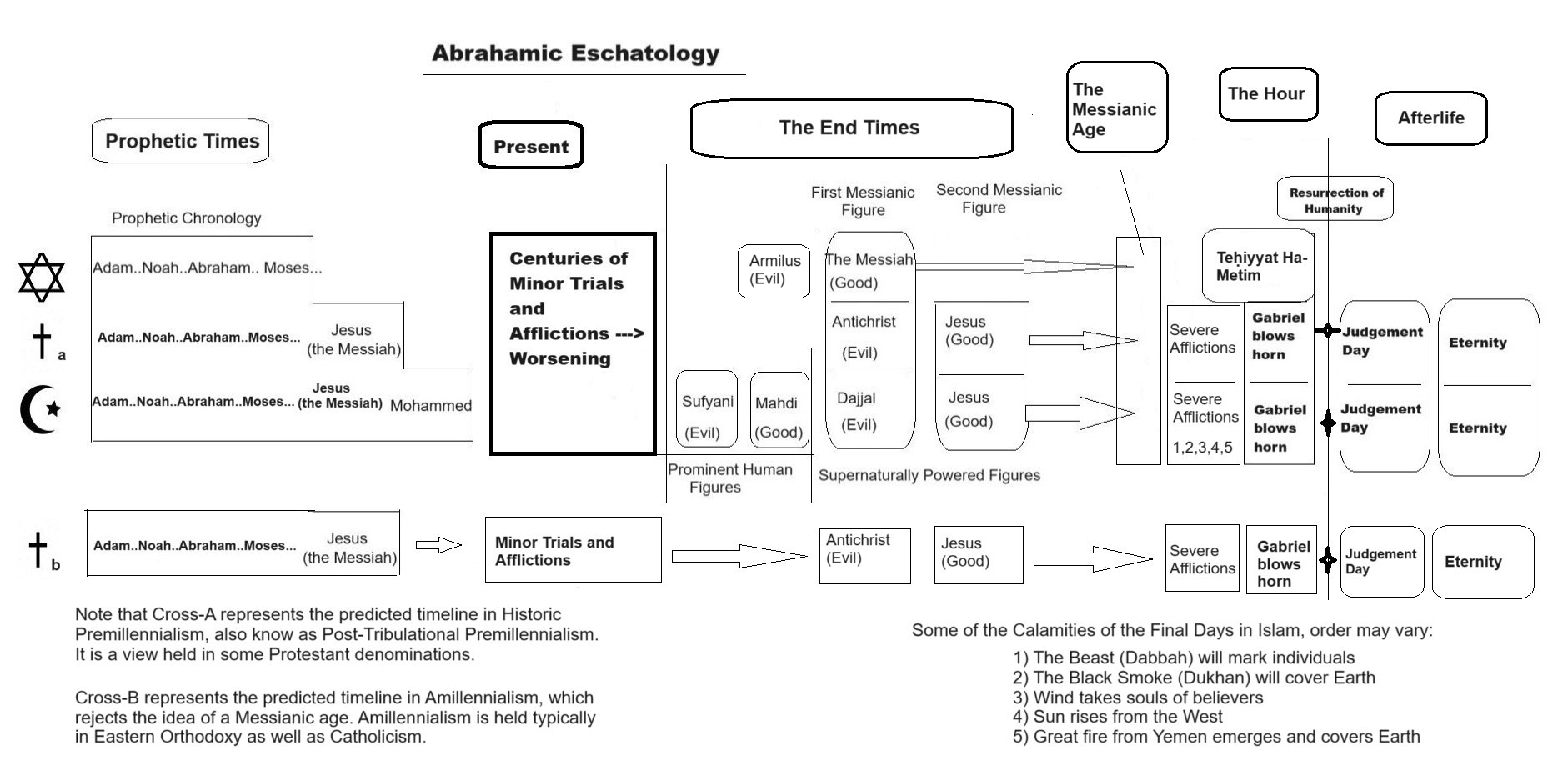
Armilus Chart

The name might be derived from that of Romulus, one of the founders of Rome, or from Ahriman, the evil principle in Zoroastrianism (Angra Mainyu).

== Appearance ==
Midrash Vayosha depicts Armilus as bald, partially deaf, partially maimed, and partially leprous.

== See also ==
- Antichrist
- Belial
- False messiah
- Jewish messianism
- Masih ad-Dajjal
- Messiah ben Joseph
