= Menahem ben Hezekiah =

Quasi-messianic Jewish teacher born on the day the Second Temple was destroyed

In the Talmud, Menahem ben Hezekiah was a quasi-messianic Jewish teacher born on the day the Second Temple was destroyed (AD 70). He may be the same as Menahem ben Judah; also see Menahem ben Ammiel.

In the Babylonian Talmud Sanhedrin 98b, he is mentioned along with a list of other names of the messiah suggested by different rabbis. It is accompanied by a reference to Lamentations 1:16, where the word menahem is used, possibly in its literal meaning of 'comforter': "Because Menahem, that would relieve my soul, is far."

In the Jerusalem Talmud Brachot 2:4, 5a an Arab tells a Jew that the messiah is born. His father’s name is Hezekiah, and he will be named Menahem. Selling his cow and plough, he buys some swaddling cloth and travels from town to town. He travels to Bethlehem, where the child is born. All the women are buying their children clothing, except Menahem’s mother. She says her son is an enemy of Israel because he is born on the day the Second Temple was destroyed. He tells her that if she does not have money today she can pay later. When he returns, she tells him that Menahem has been carried by a divine wind up to heaven. He will later return as Israel’s messiah.

== See also ==
- Servant songs § Jewish interpretation
