= Midrash Vayosha =

Midrash Vayosha (Hebrew: מדרש ויושע) is an 11th-century CE midrash, one of the smaller midrashim. It is based on Exodus 14:30-15:18. It is an exposition in the style of the later aggadah, and seems to have been intended for Shabbat Shirah or for the seventh day of Passover.

== Sources ==
Entire sections of Midrash Vayosha are taken verbatim from the Tanhuma, such as the passage on Exodus 15:3 and on 15:5. The story in the exposition of Exodus 14:30, concerning Satan, who appeared before Abraham and Isaac as they went to the sacrifice, may be compared with similar stories in several other works of midrash. The midrash on Exodus 15:2,7 also contains extracts from the Chronicle of Moses; the passage on Usa, the genius of Egypt, agreeing word for word with the excerpt in Yalkut Shimoni § 241. Here the first edition has merely "Midrash," while other editions give the Midrash Abkir as the source, although it is doubtful whether this aggadah ever occurred in that work.

== Contents ==
The sections begin for the most part with the words ameru hachamim, although Joshua ben Levi and Samuel ben Nahman are occasionally given as the authors.

In the exposition of Exodus 15:18 on the sorrows and the redemption in the Messianic time, the terrible figure of Armilus is described. It is said that he will slay the Messiah son of Joseph, but will himself be slain by the Messiah who is the son of David; God will then gather together the scattered remnant of Israel and hold the final judgment. The wonderful beauty of a new world full of joy and happiness is revealed.

== Editions ==
The midrash was first published at Constantinople in 1519, and has been reprinted by A. Jellinek.
