= Abu Isa =

Rebel of al-Mansur's era

Abu Isa Ishaq ibn Ya'qub
- Died: Ray, Khorasan, Abbasid Caliphate
- Cause of death: Died in battle
- Criminal charges: Rebellion against State (Treason)
- Penalty: Death

Abu ʿIsa was an alleged Jewish prophet who lived in the 8th century CE in Persia. He founded the Isawiyya movement that led a military revolt in the city of Isfahan. The timing of this event is disputed, but it is thought to have occurred as early as the reign of the caliph Abd al-Malik ibn Marwan and as late as that of Marwan II (early to mid-eighth century CE). Eventually, he was killed by al-Mansur near Ray. Abu 'Isa was identified with the Dajjal (an Antimessiah-figure) in a famous Sunni hadith that reads "the Dajjal will be followed by 70,000 Jews of Isfahan wearing Persian shawls".

Abu Isa is seen as the most notable Jewish prophet figure between the Bar Kokhba revolt in the second century and Sabbatai Zevi in the seventeenth century CE. He was described in dozens of Islamic and Jewish sources of historiography from his until early modern times. He is also known for his relativizing view of prior religions: he accepted the prophethoods both of Muhammad and Jesus, while also claiming that they were only prophets to their own communities.

Abu Isa was known by many different names depending on the source, including Ovadiah, 'Isa al-Isfahani, Muhammad ibn 'Isa, Ishaq ibn Ya'qub al-Isfahani, and Isaac ben Jacob al-Isfahani.

== Dating issues ==
The dating of Abu Isa's career has been disputed since the Middle Ages. The two main sources for information of him are Qirqisani, a Jewish Karaite historian; and Shahrastani, who wrote an extensive guide to Jewish sects over the ages. Qirqisani places the events in the reign of the Umayyad Caliph Abd al-Malik (685 - 705 CE) while Shahrastani says it began under the reign of Marwan II (744 - 750) on through to Al-Mansur (d. 775). Qirqisani's dates place Abu Isa's uprising during Umayyad clashes with the Byzantines which would coincide with Messianic stories of the battle between Gog and Magog and place it early enough to influence Karaism; Shahrastani's would put the revolt at the end of the Umayyad Dynasty and thus at a pivotal point of upheaval in the Muslim world. Both are plausible and there is no direct Isawite documentation.

The Turkish scholar Halil Ibrahim Bulut in 2004 has shown that Shahrastani's 'Abbasid date is more likely.

== Beliefs ==
Abu Isa believed that he was the last of five heralds from God announcing the imminent arrival of the messiah. Never did he claim to be the Messiah himself, but some of his followers felt that he would return after his death and bring the End Times. He made some minor alterations to the general set of Rabbinic laws and his followers became ascetic in their manners. The most radical of the Isawite beliefs was the acceptance of both Jesus and Muhammad as true prophets, but only to their own peoples.

- Other alterations included:
  - Banning of the consumption of wine and meat at certain times;
  - Sunnah prayers to 7 or 10 depending on the source (in addition to the standard 3);
  - Forbidding divorce, except in cases of adultery, in accordance with the opinion of the House of Shammai.
  - Belief that Alnabi is a collection of Hakhams;

The ban on meat is actually a Talmudic reference to not eating meat in exile, while the additional prayers are usually explained by noting Psalm 119:164.

== Possible connection to Shi'ism ==
The arrival of Abu Isa comes at an interesting point in the history of the Jews and the Muslims. Regardless of the which dates are true, the formative political milieu of the Isawiyya movement must be placed among the extremist proto-Shia movement led by Abu Mansur based on a variety of thematic, theological, and legalistic similarities between the two, these being "(1) the date [of the movement], (2) a heavenly ascent, (3) illiteracy, (4) prophetology, (5) temporary leadership status, (6) tax raising, (7) the role of Christ, (8) the role of the desert, and (9) militarism."

With the center of these movements being Iraq and later Persia, it should come as no surprise that the other ahl al-kitab or "People of the Book" might be influenced. Some Jews actually saw the coming of the Arabs as the apocalypse that would usher in the new age, but there are distinctive influences that can be noted in this movement from Shi'ism. The idea of the illiterate prophet is equated with the story of Muhammad and his receiving of the Qur'an while the idea of a chain of prophets is notably similar to the Imams and the foreseen coming of the Mahdi. Scholars disagree to what degree Shi'ism affected Abu Isa or whether Shi'ism was at the same time developing and incorporating Jewish elements.

== Reception in Judaism ==
Maimonides acknowledges and addresses such an account in his Epistle to Yemen (Iggeret Teiman, Section XVIII-XIX), as follows:

"I shall now narrate to you succinctly several episodes subsequent to the rise of the Arabic kingdom from which you will derive some benefit.19 One of these refers to the Exodus of a multitude of Jews, numbering hundred of thousands, from the East beyond Ispahan, led by an individual who pretended to be the Messiah. They were accoutered with military equipment, and drawn swords, and slew all those that...Whereupon the sages explained to them that this interpretation was incorrect, and that he lacked even one of the characteristics of the Messiah, let alone all of them. Furthermore they advised them as follows: ,O, brethren, you are still near your native country and have the possibility of returning thither. If you remain in this land you will not only perish, but also undermine the teachings of Moses, by misleading people to believe that the Messiah has appeared and has been vanquished, whereas you have neither a prophet in your midst, nor an omen betokening his oncoming.'"

== See also ==
- Jewish Messiah claimants
