= 4Q175 =

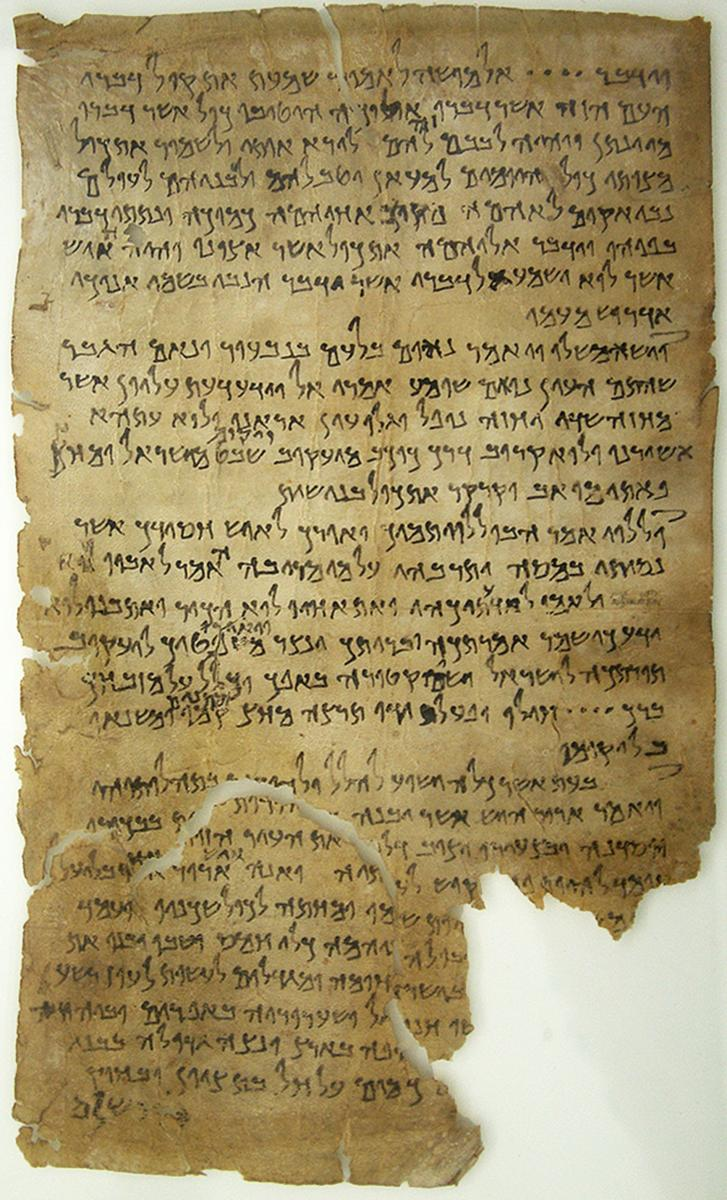
4Q175

4Q175 (or 4QTest), also known as The Testimonia, is one of the Dead Sea Scrolls and was found in Cave 4 at Qumran in the West Bank. Only one sheet long, 4Q175 is a collection of scriptural quotations seemingly connected to a messianic figure. The manuscript was written in Hasmonean script of the early 1st century BCE.

== Contents ==
The Testimonia is a short document containing five Biblical quotations arranged in four sections concerning God's activities at the end-time. Only the last section is followed by an interpretation. The first three sections refer to future blessings which will come from three figures, a prophet similar to Moses, a messianic figure and a priestly teacher.

The first section consists of two texts from Deuteronomy and refers to the prophet-figure who is like Moses (Deuteronomy 5:28-29; 18:18-19). The second section is an extract from a prophecy of Balaam about the Messiah-figure, who is similar to David (Numbers 24:15-17). This prophecy predicts "A star shall come out of Jacob and a sceptre shall arise out of Israel; he shall crush the temples of Moab and destroy all the children of Sheth." The third section is a blessing of the Levites, and of the Priest-Messiah who will be a teacher like Levi (Deuteronomy 33:8-11). The last section begins with a verse from Joshua (6:26), which is then expounded by means of a quotation from the Psalms of Joshua (see 4Q379). These verses show that the Qumran community was interested in the messianic prophecies found in the Tanakh.

The message of those 5 verses are:

- God promised wellness for his followers

- God will send a prophet

- There will be an Israel leader that will occupy Moab

- God, bless the army of the high-priest ("Your Thummim and Urim...Bless all his army, Lord").

- The person who will rebuild Jericho will be cursed

The first four verses are positive and praise one man as opposed to the last verse and the speech which disgrace another wicked man who rebuilt Jericho and started a civil war.

== Interpretation ==
Some scholars associate the three figures described in 4Q175 with a father and two sons. John Marco Allegro believed them to be Alexander Jannaeus and his sons; Frank Moore Cross identified them as Mattathias and his sons Simon and Judas Maccabee who were all central figures in the Maccabean revolt; while Otto Betz believed they were the Hasmonean king John Hyrcanus and his two sons Aristobulus and Alexander Jannaeus. Some Muslims believe that the mentioned figure in the said scroll is Muhammad.

Many scholars believe that the scribe who copied 4Q175 also copied the Community Rule (1QS) found in Cave 1 as well as a Samuel manuscript also found in Cave 4. All have been dated by palaeography to the Hasmonean period.

== See also ==
- 4Q107
- 4Q108
- 4QMMT
- Tanakh at Qumran
