= Jewish eschatology =

Area of Jewish theology

Jewish eschatology is the area of Jewish theology concerned with events that will happen in the end of days and related concepts. This includes the ingathering of the exiled diaspora, the coming of the Jewish Messiah, the afterlife, and the resurrection of the dead. In Judaism, the end times are usually called the "end of days" (Hebrew: אַחֲרִית הַיָמִים, romanized: ʾaḥărît hayyāmîm), a phrase that appears throughout the Tanakh. These beliefs have evolved over time, and according to some scholars there is evidence of Jewish belief in a personal afterlife with reward or punishment referenced in the Torah.

== Sources ==
In Judaism, the main textual source for the belief in the end of days and accompanying events is the Tanakh or Hebrew Bible. The roots of Jewish eschatology are to be found in the pre-exile prophets, including Isaiah and Jeremiah, and the exilic prophets Ezekiel and Deutero-Isaiah. The main tenets of Jewish eschatology are the following, in no particular order, elaborated in the Book of Isaiah, the Book of Jeremiah, and the Book of Ezekiel.

== The End of Days ==
=== War of Gog and Magog ===
According to Ezekiel 38, the "war of Gog and Magog" is a climactic war that will happen at the end of the Jewish exile. According to biblical commentator and rabbi David Kimhi, this war will take place in Jerusalem.

=== Events to occur ===
- God redeems the Jewish people from their captivity that began with the Babylonian captivity, in a new Exodus (Kibbutz Galuyot)
- God returns the Jewish people to the Land of Israel
- God restores the kingly House of David and the Temple in Jerusalem
- God appoints a regent from the House of David (i.e., the Messiah) to lead the Jewish people and the world and usher in the Messianic Age, which is characterised by justice, righteousness, and peace
- All the gentile nations recognize Israel's God as the only true God and gather to the Mount Zion
- God resurrects the dead and judges all souls (and sends some for a year to Gehinnom)
- God creates a new Heaven and new Earth

== Biblical Sheol ==
The Hebrew Bible reflects the belief of the Israelites in an arguably Hades-like afterworld, where both the righteous (see Samuel) and the unrighteous continue to exist in a miserable manner.

== World to come ==
The afterlife is known as olam ha-ba (עוֹלָם הַבָּא, 'coming world', 'next world'), being related to the concepts of Gan Eden— heavenly "Garden in Eden", or Paradise—and Gehinnom. The phrase olam ha-ba itself does not occur in the Hebrew Bible. In Jewish theology, the widely accepted Halakha is that it is impossible for living human beings to know what the world to come is like.

=== Second Temple period ===
In the late Second Temple period, beliefs about the ultimate fate of individuals were diverse. The Pharisees and Essenes believed in the immortality of the soul, but the Sadducees did not. The Dead Sea Scrolls, Jewish pseudepigrapha, and Jewish magical papyri all reflect this variety of opinions.

=== Medieval rabbinical views ===
While classical rabbinic sources discuss the afterlife, medieval scholars disputed the nature of individuals' continued existence after the Messianic Age. While Maimonides describes an entirely spiritual existence for souls, which he calls "disembodied intellects", Nachmanides proposes a spiritual existence on Earth in which spirituality and physicality are merged. Both agree that life after death is, as Maimonides describes, the "End of Days". This existence entails a heightened understanding of and connection to the Shekhinah. All classical rabbinic scholars share this latter view.

According to Maimonides, any non-Jew who lives according to the Seven Laws of Noah is regarded as a righteous gentile and assured a place in the world to come (the final reward of the righteous).

There is a great deal of surviving rabbinic material concerning the fate of the soul after death, its experiences, and where it goes. At various points in the afterlife journey, the soul may encounter: hibbut ha-kever, the pains and other experiences of physico-spiritual dissolution or reconfiguration within the grave; Dumah, the angel in charge of funerary matters; Satan, as the angel of death or another equally grim figure; the Kaf ha-Kela, the ensnarement or confinement of the stripped-down soul within ghostly material reallocations, described in chapter 8 of the Tanya, Chabad's primary philosophical text, as devised for the cleansing of souls needing punishment not severe enough to warrant Gehinnom; Gehinnom; and Gan Eden (a place of heavenly respite or paradise characterized by spiritual purity). Classical rabbinic scholars agree that these concepts are beyond typical human understanding, so these ideas are expressed throughout rabbinic literature as parables and analogies.

Gehenna is fairly well defined in the rabbinic literature. It is sometimes translated as "hell" but is more similar to Nicene Christianity's purgatory than to its Hell. Rabbinic thought maintains that souls are not tortured in Gehenna forever; the longest that one can be there is said to be eleven months, with the exception of heretics and the exceedingly sinful. This is why Jews mourning for near relatives will not recite mourner's kaddish for more than eleven months after death. Gehinnom is considered a spiritual forge whereby the soul is purified for its eventual ascent to Gan Eden (Garden of Eden).

=== Rabbinic legends ===
The rabbinic literature includes many legends about the world to come and the two Gardens of Eden. As compiled by Louis Ginzberg in the book Legends of the Jews, these include the world to come, called Paradise, said to have a double gate made of carbuncle and guarded by 600,000 shining angels. Seven clouds of glory overshadow Paradise, and under them, in the center of Paradise, stands the Tree of Life. The Tree of Life overshadows Paradise, too; it has fifteen thousand different tastes and aromas, blown by wind throughout. Under the Tree of Life are many pairs of canopies, one of the stars and the other of sun and moon, while a "cloud of glory" separates the two. In each pair of canopies, a rabbinic scholar explains the Torah to the soul. When one enters Paradise, one is proffered by Michael the archangel to God on the altar of the Temple in the heavenly Jerusalem. The soul is transfigured into an angel, with the ugliest person becoming as beautiful and shining as "the grains of a silver pomegranate upon which fall the rays of the sun". The angels that guard Paradise's gate adorn the soul in seven clouds of glory, crown it with gems, pearls, and gold, place eight myrtles in its hand, and praise it for being righteous before leading it to a garden of eight hundred roses and myrtles watered by many rivers. In the Garden is one's own canopy, its beauty according to one's merit, but each canopy has four rivers—milk, honey, wine, and balsam—flowing out from it, and has a golden vine and thirty shining pearls hanging from it. Under each canopy is a table of gems and pearls attended to by sixty angels. The light of Paradise is the light of the righteous souls therein. Each day in Paradise, one wakes up as a child and goes to bed as an elder, enjoying the pleasures of childhood, youth, adulthood, and old age. In each corner of Paradise is a forest of 800,000 trees, the least among these greater than the best herbs and spices, attended to by 800,000 sweetly singing angels. Paradise is divided into seven sub-paradises, each 120,000 miles long and wide. Depending on its merit, a soul is assigned to one of these sections of Paradise: the first is made of glass and cedar and is for converts to Judaism; the second is of silver and cedar and is for penitents; the third is of silver, gold, gems, and pearls, and is for the Patriarchs, Moses and Aaron, the Israelites who fled Egypt and lived in the wilderness, and the kings of Israel; the fourth is of rubies and olive wood and is for the holy and steadfast of faith; the fifth is like the third, except a river flows through it and its bed was woven by Eve and the angels and is for the Messiah and Elijah; and the sixth and seventh divisions are not described, except that they are respectively for those who died doing pious acts and those who died from illness in expiation for Israel's sins.

Above this Paradise is the higher Gan Eden, where God is enthroned and explains the Torah to its inhabitants. The higher Gan Eden contains 310 worlds and is divided into seven compartments. The compartments are not described, though it is implied that each compartment is greater than the previous one and is made open to a soul based on its merit. The first compartment is for Jewish martyrs, the second for those who drowned, the third for "Rabban Yohanan ben Zakkai and his disciples", the fourth for those whom the "cloud of glory" carried off, the fifth for penitents, the sixth for youths who never sinned, and the seventh for the poor who lived decently and studied the Torah.

=== Resurrection of the dead ===
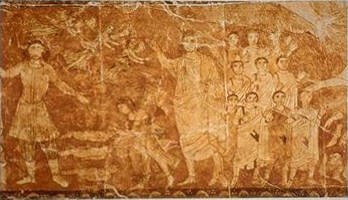
Resurrection of the dead, fresco from the Dura-Europos synagogue

An early explicit mention of resurrection in Hebrew texts is the Vision of the Valley of Dry Bones in the Book of Ezekiel, dated c. 539 B.C.E. Alan Segal argues that this narrative was intended as a metaphor for national rebirth, promising the Jews' return to Israel and reconstruction of the Temple, not as a description of personal resurrection.

The Book of Daniel promised literal resurrection to the Jews in concrete detail. Alan Segal interprets Daniel as writing that with the coming of the archangel Michael, misery would beset the world, and only those whose names were written in a divine book would be resurrected. Moreover, Daniel's promise of resurrection was intended only for the most righteous and the most sinful: the afterlife was a place for righteous individuals to be rewarded and unrighteous individuals to receive eternal punishment.

The Hebrew Bible, at least its rabbinic interpretation in tractate Sanhedrin, contains frequent references to the resurrection of the dead. The Mishnah lists belief in the resurrection of the dead as one of three essential beliefs of Judaism:

All Israel have a portion in the world to come, for it is written: 'Thy people are all righteous; they shall inherit the land forever, the branch of my planting, the work of my hands, that I may be glorified.' But the following have no portion therein: one who maintains that resurrection is not a biblical doctrine, the Torah was not divinely revealed, and an Apikoros ('heretic').

In the late Second Temple period, the Pharisees and Essenes believed in resurrection, while Sadducees did not. During the period of Chazal, signaling the adoption of resurrection into the Jewish canon.

Jewish liturgy, most notably the Amidah, contains references to the bodily resurrection of the dead. In contemporary Judaism, both Orthodox Judaism and Conservative Judaism maintain the traditional references to it in their liturgy. However, Conservative Jewish leadership has officially acknowledged metaphorical rather than literal interpretations, too. Reform and Reconstructionist Judaism have altered traditional references to the resurrection of the dead in the liturgy, revising "who gives life to the dead" to "who gives life to all" in the second blessing of the Amidah.

=== The last judgment ===
In Judaism, the day of judgment happens every year on Rosh Hashanah; therefore, a future "last day" of judgment for all humankind is disputed. Some hold that there will be such a day following the resurrection of the dead. Others maintain that there is no need for that because of Rosh Hashanah. Yet others hold that this accounting and judgment occur at death. Others contend that the last judgment only applies to the gentile nations and not the Jewish people.

=== In contemporary Judaism ===
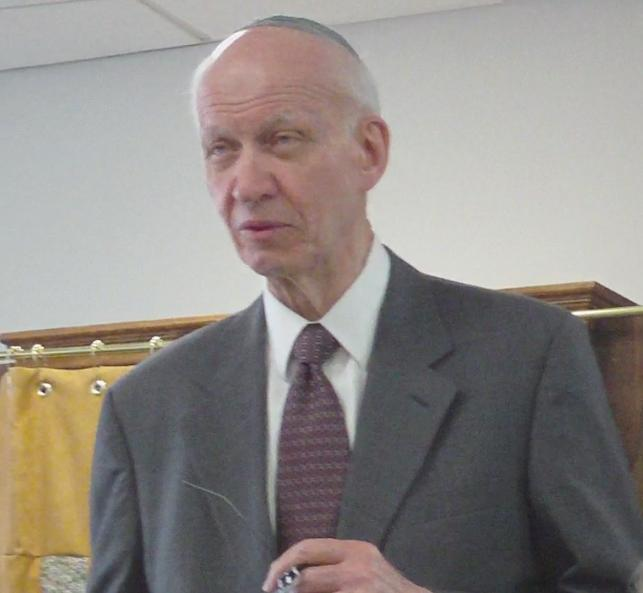
Irving Greenberg

Irving Greenberg, representing an Open Orthodox viewpoint, describes the afterlife as a central Jewish teaching deriving from the belief in reward and punishment. According to Greenberg, suffering medieval Jews emphasized the world to come as a counterpoint to the difficulties of this life, while early Jewish modernizers portrayed Judaism as concerned only with this world, in contrast to "otherworldly" Christianity. Greenberg sees each of these views as leading to an undesired extreme—overemphasizing the afterlife leads to asceticism, while devaluing the afterlife deprives Jews of the consolation of eternal life and justice—and calls for a synthesis, in which Jews can work to perfect this world, while also recognizing the immortality of the soul.

Conservative Judaism both affirms belief in the world beyond (as referenced in the Amidah and Maimonides's principles of faith) while recognizing that human understanding is limited and we cannot know exactly what the world beyond consists of. Reform and Reconstructionist Judaism affirm belief in the afterlife, though they downplay the theological implications in favor of emphasizing the importance of the "here and now" as opposed to reward and punishment. The Union for Reform Judaism believes the righteous of any faith have a place in heaven, but does not believe in a concept of hell.

== Jewish messianism ==
The Hebrew word mashiach (or moshiach) refers to the Jewish idea of the messiah. In biblical times the title mashiach was awarded to someone in a high position of nobility and greatness. For example, Cohen ha-Mašíaḥ means High Priest. While the name of the Jewish Messiah is considered to be one of the things that precede creation, he is not considered divine, in contrast to Christianity where Jesus is both divine and the Messiah.

In the Talmudic era the title Mashiach or מלך המשיח, Méleḵ ha-Mašíaḥ literally means "the anointed King". The Messiah is to be a human leader, physically descended from the Davidic line, who will rule and unite the people of Israel and will usher in the Messianic Age of global and universal peace.

=== Early Second Temple period (516 BCE – c.220 BCE) ===
Early in the Second Temple period hopes for a better future are described in the Jewish scriptures. After the return from the Babylonian exile, Cyrus the Great was called "messiah" in Isaiah, due to his role in the return of the Jews exiles.

=== Later Second Temple period (c.220 BCE – 70 CE) ===
A number of messianic ideas developed during the later Second Temple Period, ranging from this-worldy, political expectations, to apocalyptic expectations of an endtime in which the dead would be resurrected and the Kingdom of Heaven would be established on earth. The Messiah might be a kingly "son of David" or a more heavenly "son of man", but "Messianism became increasingly eschatological, and eschatology was decisively influenced by apocalypticism," while messianic expectations became increasingly focused on the figure of an individual savior. According to Zwi Werblowsky, "the Messiah no longer symbolized the coming of the new age, but he was somehow supposed to bring it about. The "Lord's anointed" thus became the "savior and redeemer" and the focus of more intense expectations and doctrines." Messianic ideas developed both by new interpretations (pesher, midrash) of the Jewish scriptures, but also by visionary revelations.

=== Talmud ===
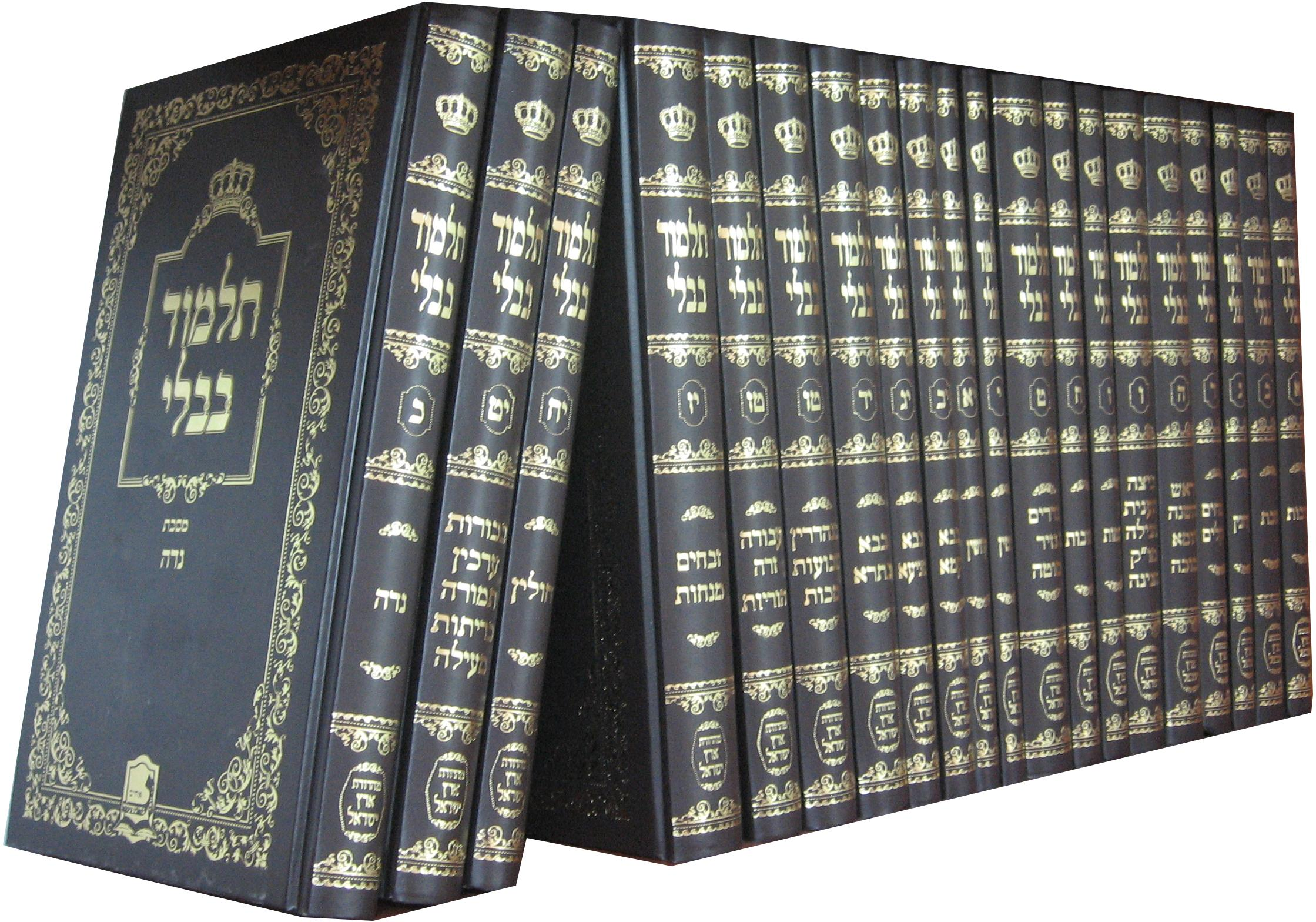
A full set of the Babylonian Talmud

The Babylonian Talmud (200–500 CE), tractate Sanhedrin, contains a long discussion of the events leading to the coming of the Messiah. (Note: For example: "R. Johanan said: When you see a generation ever dwindling, hope for him [the Messiah], as it is written, and the afflicted people thou wilt save. R. Johanan said: When thou seest a generation overwhelmed by many troubles as by a river, await him, as it is written, when the enemy shall come in like a flood, the Spirit of the Lord shall lift up a standard against him; which is followed by, and the Redeemer shall come to Zion. R. Johanan also said: The son of David will come only in a generation that is either altogether righteous or altogether wicked. 'In a generation that is altogether righteous,' — as it is written, Thy people also shall be all righteous: they shall inherit the land for ever. 'Or altogether wicked,' — as it is written, And he saw that there was no man, and wondered that there was no intercessor;31 and it is [elsewhere] written, For mine own sake, even for mine own sake, will I do it.) Throughout their history Jews have compared these passages (and others) to contemporary events in search of signs of the Messiah's imminent arrival, continuing into present times.

The Talmud tells many stories about the Messiah, some of which represent famous Talmudic rabbis as receiving personal visitations from Elijah the Prophet and the Messiah. (Note: For example: "R. Joshua b. Levi met Elijah standing by the entrance of R. Simeon b. Yohai's tomb. He asked him: 'Have I a portion in the world to come?' He replied, 'if this Master desires it.' R. Joshua b. Levi said, 'I saw two, but heard the voice of a third.' He then asked him, 'When will the Messiah come?' — 'Go and ask him himself,' was his reply. 'Where is he sitting?' — 'At the entrance.' And by what sign may I recognise him?' — 'He is sitting among the poor lepers: all of them untie [them] all at once, and rebandage them together, whereas he unties and rebandages each separately, [before treating the next], thinking, should I be wanted, [it being time for my appearance as the Messiah] I must not be delayed [through having to bandage a number of sores].' So he went to him and greeted him, saying, 'peace upon thee, Master and Teacher.' 'peace upon thee, O son of Levi,' he replied. 'When wilt thou come Master?' asked he, 'To-day', was his answer. On his returning to Elijah, the latter enquired, 'What did he say to thee?' — 'peace Upon thee, O son of Levi,' he answered. Thereupon he [Elijah] observed, 'He thereby assured thee and thy father of [a portion in] the world to come.' 'He spoke falsely to me,' he rejoined, 'stating that he would come to-day, but has not.' He [Elijah] answered him, 'This is what he said to thee, To-day, if ye will hear his voice (Psalms 95).')

=== Rabbinic commentaries ===
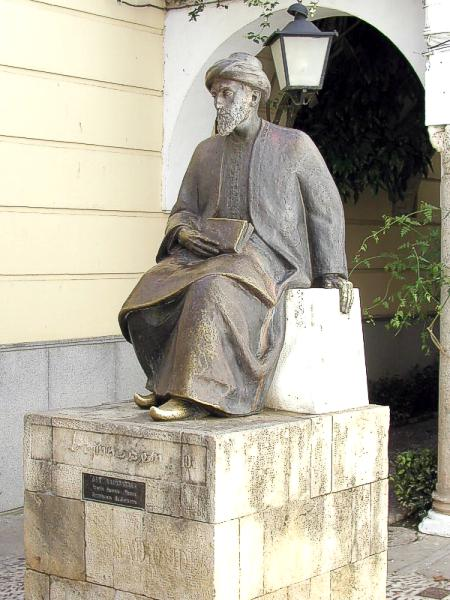
Monument to Maimonides in Córdoba

In rabbinic literature, the rabbis elaborated and explained the prophecies that were found in the Hebrew Bible along with the oral law and rabbinic traditions about its meaning.

Maimonides' commentary to tractate Sanhedrin stresses a relatively naturalistic interpretation of the Messiah, de-emphasizing miraculous elements. His commentary became widely (although not universally) accepted in the non- or less-mystical branches of Orthodox Judaism. (Note: Maimonides: "The Messianic age is when the Jews will regain their independence and all return to the land of Israel. The Messiah will be a very great king, he will achieve great fame, and his reputation among the gentile nations will be even greater than that of King Solomon. His great righteousness and the wonders that he will bring about will cause all peoples to make peace with him and all lands to serve him [....] Nothing will change in the Messianic age, however, except that Jews will regain their independence. Rich and poor, strong and weak, will still exist. However it will be very easy for people to make a living, and with very little effort they will be able to accomplish very much [....] it will be a time when the number of wise men will increase [....] war shall not exist, and nation shall no longer lift up sword against nation.... The Messianic age will be highlighted by a community of the righteous and dominated by goodness and wisdom. It will be ruled by the Messiah, a righteous and honest king, outstanding in wisdom, and close to God. Do not think that the ways of the world or the laws of nature will change, this is not true. The world will continue as it is. The prophet Isaiah predicted "The wolf shall live with the sheep; the leopard shall lie down with the kid." This, however, is merely allegory, meaning that the Jews will live safely, even with the formerly wicked nations. All nations will return to the true religion and will no longer steal or oppress. Note that all prophecies regarding the Messiah are allegorical. Only in the Messianic age will we know the meaning of each allegory and what it comes to teach us. Our sages and prophets did not long for the Messianic age in order that they might rule the world and dominate the gentiles, the only thing they wanted was to be free for Jews to involve themselves with the Torah and its wisdom.)

=== Contemporary views ===
==== Orthodox Judaism ====
The belief in a human Messiah of the Davidic line is a universal tenet of faith among Orthodox Jews and one of Maimonides' thirteen principles of faith.

Some authorities in Orthodox Judaism believe that this era will lead to supernatural events culminating in a bodily resurrection of the dead. Maimonides, on the other hand, holds that the events of the Messianic Era are not specifically connected with the resurrection.

==== Conservative Judaism ====
Conservative Judaism varies in its teachings. While it retains traditional references to a personal redeemer and prayers for the restoration of the Davidic line in the liturgy, Conservative Jews are more inclined to accept the idea of a Messianic Era:

We do not know when the Messiah will come, nor whether he will be a charismatic human figure or is a symbol of the redemption of mankind from the evils of the world. Through the doctrine of a Messianic figure, Judaism teaches us that every individual human being must live as if he or she, individually, has the responsibility to bring about the messianic age. Beyond that, we echo the words of Maimonides based on the prophet Habakkuk (2:3) that though he may tarry, yet do we wait for him each day... (Emet ve-Emunah: Statement of Principles of Conservative Judaism)

==== Reform Judaism ====
Reform Judaism generally concurs with the more liberal Conservative perspective of a future Messianic Era rather than a human Messiah.

== See also ==
- Saoshyant
- The Secrets of Rabbi Simon ben Yohai
- Apocalypse of Zerubbabel
