= Messiah in Judaism =

Savior and liberator of the Jewish people

In Jewish eschatology, the Messiah (Hebrew: מָשִׁיחַ, romanized: māšīaḥ) is a savior and liberator figure who is believed to be the future redeemer of the Jews and the one to usher in the reformation of Israel through nonviolence. The concept of messianism originated in Judaism, and in the Hebrew Bible a messiah is a king or High Priest of Israel traditionally anointed with holy anointing oil.

However, messiahs were not exclusively Jewish, as the Hebrew Bible refers to Cyrus the Great, an Achaemenid emperor, as a messiah for his decree to rebuild the Jerusalem Temple.

In Jewish eschatology, the Messiah is a future Jewish king from the Davidic line, who is expected to be anointed with holy anointing oil and rule the Jewish people during the Messianic Age and world to come. The Messiah is often referred to as "King Messiah" (Hebrew: מלך משיח, romanized: melekh mashiach, Jewish Babylonian Aramaic: מַלכָא (הוּא) מְשִיחָא, romanized: malkā (hu) mšiḥā).

Jewish messianism gave birth to Christianity, which started as a Second Temple period messianic Jewish religious movement.

== Etymology ==
In Jewish eschatology, the term Messiah refers specifically to a future Jewish king from the Davidic line, who is expected to save the Jewish nation and will be anointed with holy anointing oil and rule the Jewish people during the Messianic Age. The Messiah is often referred to as King Messiah. In a generalized sense, messiah has "the connotation of a savior or redeemer who would appear at the end of days and usher in the kingdom of God, the restoration of Israel, or whatever dispensation was considered to be the ideal state of the world."

Messianism "denotes a movement, or a system of beliefs and ideas, centered on the expectation of the advent of a messiah." Orthodox views hold that the Messiah will be a blood descendent from the Davidic line through his father, and will gather the Jews back into the Land of Israel, usher in an era of peace, build the Third Temple, father a male heir, re-institute the Sanhedrin, and so on. However, the word Mashiach is rarely used in Jewish literature from the 1st century BCE to the 1st-century CE.

The Jewish tradition of the period centering on the destruction of the Second Temple (70 CE) alludes to two redeemers, one suffering and the second fulfilling the traditional messianic role: respectively, ben Yosef and ben David. Messiah unqualified refers to ben David.

Belief in the future advent of the Messiah was first recorded in the Talmud and later codified in halakha by Maimonides in the Mishneh Torah as one of the fundamental requisites of the Jewish faith, concerning which it has been written: "Anyone who does not believe in him, or who does not wait for his arrival, has not merely denied the other prophets, but has also denied the Torah and Moses, our Rabbi."

== Origins and history ==
=== Pre-exile Jewish eschatology (8th–6th cent. BCE) ===
The roots of Jewish eschatology are to be found in the pre-exile prophets, including Isaiah and Jeremiah, and the exile prophets Ezekiel and Deutero-Isaiah. The main tenets of Jewish eschatology are the following, in no particular order, elaborated in the books of Isaiah, Jeremiah and Ezekiel:

- End of world (before everything as follows).
- God redeems the Jewish people from the captivity that began during the Babylonian captivity, in a new Exodus
- God returns the Jewish people to the Land of Israel
- God restores the House of David and the Temple in Jerusalem
- God creates a regent from the House of David (i.e. the Jewish Messiah) to lead the Jewish people and the world and usher in an age of justice and peace
- All nations recognize that the God of Israel is the only true God
- God resurrects the dead
- God creates a new heaven and a new earth

=== Second Temple period (516 BCE–70 CE) ===
Early in the Second Temple period, hopes for a better future are described in the Jewish scriptures.

Some messianic ideas developed during the later Second Temple period, ranging from this-worldly, political expectations to apocalyptic expectations of an end time in which the dead would be resurrected, and the Kingdom of Heaven would be established on earth. The Messiah might be a kingly "Son of David," or a more heavenly "son of man", but "Messianism became increasingly eschatological, and eschatology was decisively influenced by apocalypticism", while "messianic expectations became increasingly focused on the figure of an individual savior." According to R. J. Zwi Werblowsky, "the Messiah no longer symbolized the coming of the new age, but he was somehow supposed to bring it about." The "Lord's anointed" thus became the "savior and redeemer" and the focus of more intense expectations and doctrines." Messianic ideas developed both by new interpretations (pesher, midrash) of the Jewish scriptures but also by visionary revelations.

==== Apocalypticism ====
===== Messiah in apocalypticism =====
Religious views on whether Hebrew Bible passages refer to a Messiah may vary among scholars of ancient Israel, looking at their meaning in their original contexts and among rabbinical scholars. The reading of messianic attestations in passages from Isaiah, Jeremiah and Ezekiel is anachronistic because messianism developed later than these texts. According to James C. VanderKam, there are no Jewish texts before the 2nd century BCE that mention a messianic leader, though some terms point in this direction. Some terms, such as the servant songs in the Book of Isaiah, were later interpreted as such.

According to Werblowsky, the brutal regime of the Hellenistic Seleucid emperor Antiochus IV Epiphanes (r. 175–163 BCE) led to renewed messianic expectations reflected in the Book of Daniel. His rule was ended by the Maccabean Revolt (167–160 BCE), and the installment of the Hasmonean dynasty (167–37 BCE). The Maccabees ruled Judea semi-independently from the Seleucid Empire from 167–110 BCE, entirely independently from 110–63 BCE, and as a Roman client state from 63–37 BCE, when Herod the Great came to power. The belief in a messianic leader further developed with the end of the Hasmonean dynasty. According to James C. VanderKam, the apocalyptic genre shows a negative attitude towards the foreign powers which ruled Judea. Rejection of these powers was not the only cause of the development of the apocalyptic genre.

VanderKam states, "the vast majority of Second Temple texts have no reference to a messianic leader of the endtime." The Animal Apocalypse of Enoch 1:85-90 (c. 160 BCE) is the first to do so. After that time, only some apocalypses and some texts which are not apocalypses but do contain apocalyptic or eschatological teachings refer to a messianic leader. According to VanderKam, the lack of messianic allusions may be explained by the fact that Judea was governed for centuries by foreign powers, often without great problems or a negative stance by Jews toward these gentile powers.

In the first century BCE, in the Qumran texts, the Psalms of Solomon, and the Similitudes of Enoch, "both foreign and native rulers are castigated and hopes are placed on a Messiah (or Messiahs) who will end the present evil age of injustice. After the First Jewish–Roman War (66-70 CE), texts like 2 Baruch and 4 Ezra reflect the despair of the time. The images and status of the messiah in the various texts are quite different, but the apocalyptic messiahs are only somewhat more exalted than the leaders portrayed in the non-apocalyptic texts.

James H. Charlesworth notes that messianic concepts are found in the Old Testament pseudepigrapha, which include a large number of Apocalypses. (Note: The Old Testament pseudepigrapha and the New Testament: Page 111 James H. Charlesworth – 1985 "The seminar was focused on an assessment of the importance of the various messianic titles and ideas in the Old Testament Pseudepigrapha and their significance for a better understanding of the origins of Christology.")

===== Book of Daniel =====
The Book of Daniel (mid-2nd c. BCE) was quoted and referenced by both Jews and Christians in the 1st century CE as predicting the imminent end-time. The concepts of immortality and resurrection, with rewards for the righteous and punishment for the wicked, have roots much deeper than Daniel, but the first clear statement is found in the final chapter of that book: "Many of those who sleep in the dust of the earth shall awake, some to everlasting life, and some to everlasting shame and contempt." Without this belief, Christianity, in which the resurrection of Jesus plays a central role, may have disappeared, like the movements following other charismatic Jewish figures of the 1st century.

===== 1 Enoch =====
The Book of Enoch (1 Enoch, (Note: There are two other books named "Enoch": 2 Enoch, surviving only in Old Slavonic (Eng. trans. by R. H. Charles 1896) and 3 Enoch (surviving in Hebrew, c. 5th to 6th century CE).) 3rd-1st c. BCE) is a Second Temple Jewish apocalyptic religious work, ascribed by tradition to Enoch, the great-grandfather of Noah. Enoch contains a prophetic exposition of the thousand-year reign of the Messiah. The older sections (mainly in the Book of the Watchers) of the text are estimated to date from about 300 BCE, while the latest part (Book of Parables) probably to the 1st century BCE.

Enoch is the first text to contain the idea of a preexistent heavenly Messiah, called the "Son of Man". 1 Enoch, and also 4 Ezra, transform the expectation of a kingly Messiah of Daniel 7 into "an exalted, heavenly messiah whose role would be to execute judgment and to inaugurate a new age of peace and rejoicing." He is described as an angelic being, who "was chosen and hidden with God before the world was created, and will remain in His presence forevermore." He is the embodiment of justice and wisdom, seated on a throne in Heaven, who will be revealed to the world at the end of times, when he will judge all beings.

Some scholars contend that Enoch was influential in molding New Testament doctrines about the Christ, the son of man, the messianic kingdom, Christian demonology, the universal resurrection, and Christian eschatology.

===== Messianic titles of the Dead Sea Scrolls =====
VanderKam further notes that a variety of titles are used for the Messiah(s) in the Dead Sea Scrolls:

- Messiah - the Damascus Document, the Rule of the Congregation, the Commentary on Genesis, 4Q521 (Messianic Apocalypse), possibly 4Q246 ("Son of God Text")
- Righteous One
- Chosen One
- Son of Man
- Son (of God)
- God's Servant
- Prince of the Congregation
- Branch of David
- Interpreter of the Law
- (High) Priest

===== Messianic allusions =====
Messianic allusions to some figures include Menahem ben Hezekiah who traditionally was born on the same day that the Second Temple was destroyed (1st century).

==== Jesus ====
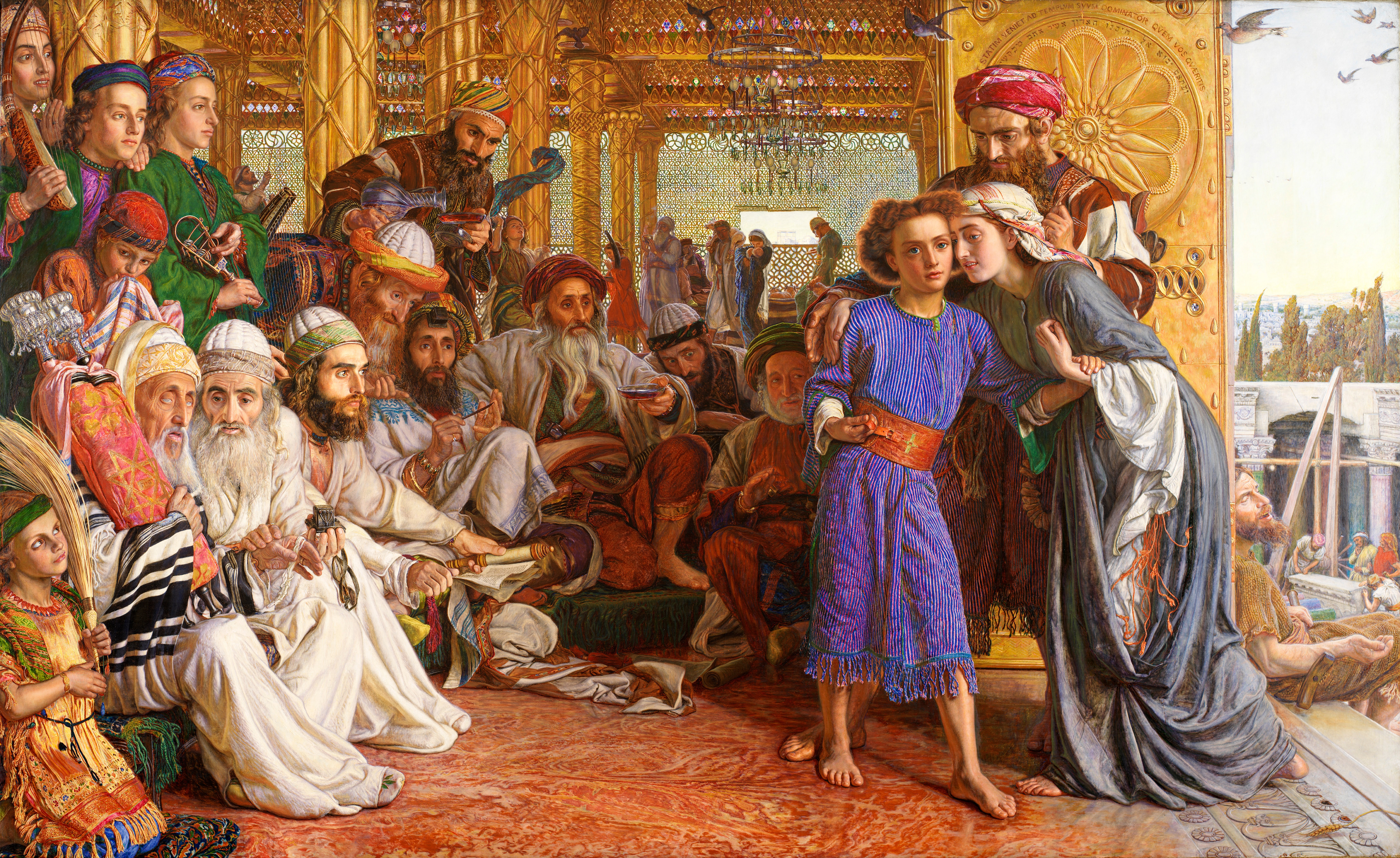
The Finding of the Saviour in the Temple by William Holman Hunt, 1860, depicting the New Testament episode Finding in the Temple

===== Jewish Christianity =====
Christianity started as a messianic Jewish sect. Most of Jesus's teachings were intelligible and acceptable in terms of Second Temple Judaism; what set the followers of Jesus apart from other Jews was their faith in Jesus as the resurrected messiah. While ancient Judaism acknowledged multiple messiahs, the two most relevant being ben Joseph and ben David, Christianity acknowledges only one ultimate Messiah. According to Larry Hurtado, "the christology and devotional stance that Paul affirmed (and shared with others in the early Jesus-movement) was not a departure from or a transcending of a supposedly monochrome Jewish messianism, but, instead, a distinctive expression within a variegated body of Jewish messianic hopes."

===== Rejection of Jesus as the Messiah =====
According to Maimonides, Jesus was the most influential, and consequently the most damaging, of all false messiahs. However, since the traditional Jewish belief is that the messiah has not yet come and the Messianic Age is not yet present, the total rejection of Jesus as either messiah or deity has never been a central issue for Judaism.

Judaism has never accepted any of the claimed fulfillments of prophecy that Christianity attributes to Jesus. Judaism forbids the worship of a person as a form of idolatry, since the central belief of Judaism is the absolute unity and singularity of God. (Note: A belief in the divinity of Jesus is incompatible with Judaism: "The point is this: that the whole Christology of the Church - the whole complex of doctrines about the Son of God who died on the Cross to save humanity from sin and death - is incompatible with Judaism, and indeed in discontinuity with the Hebraism that preceded it." Rayner, John D. A Jewish Understanding of the World, Berghahn Books, 1998, p. 187. ISBN 1-57181-974-6; "Aside from its belief in Jesus as the Messiah, Christianity has altered many of the most fundamental concepts of Judaism." Kaplan, Aryeh. The Aryeh Kaplan Anthology: Volume 1, Illuminating Expositions on Jewish Thought and Practice, Mesorah Publication, 1991, p. 264. ISBN 0-89906-866-9; "...the doctrine of Christ was and will remain alien to Jewish religious thought." Wylen, Stephen M. Settings of Silver: An Introduction to Judaism, Paulist Press, 2000, p. 75. ISBN 0-8091-3960-X; "For a Jew, however, any form of shituf is tantamount to idolatry in the fullest sense of the word. There is then no way that a Jew can ever accept Jesus as a deity, mediator or savior (messiah), or even as a prophet, without betraying Judaism." Schochet, Rabbi J. Emmanuel (29 July 1999). "Judaism has no place for those who betray their roots". The Canadian Jewish News. Archived from the original on 20 March 2001.; Judaism and Jesus Don't Mix (foundationstone.com): "If you believe Jesus is the messiah, died for anyone else's sins, is God's chosen son, or any other dogma of Christian belief, you are not Jewish. You are Christian. Period." (Jews for Jesus: Who's Who & What's What Archived 2006-11-23 at the Wayback Machine by Rabbi Susan Grossman (beliefnet - virtualtalmud) August 28, 2006); "For two thousand years, Jews rejected the claim that Jesus fulfilled the messianic prophecies of the Hebrew Bible, as well as the dogmatic claims about him made by the church fathers - that he was born of a virgin, the son of God, part of a divine Trinity, and was resurrected after his death. ... For two thousand years, a central wish of Christianity was to be the object of desire by Jews, whose conversion would demonstrate their acceptance that Jesus has fulfilled their biblical prophecies." (Jewish Views of Jesus by Susannah Heschel, in Jesus In The World's Faiths: Leading Thinkers From Five Faiths Reflect On His Meaning by Gregory A. Barker, editor. (Orbis Books, 2005) ISBN 1-57075-573-6. p.149); "No Jew accepts Jesus as the Messiah. When someone makes that faith commitment, they become Christian. It is not possible for someone to be both Christian and Jewish." (Why don't Jews accept Jesus as the Messiah? by Rabbi Barry Dov Lerner)) Jewish eschatology holds that the coming of the Messiah will be associated with a specific series of events that have not yet occurred, including the return of Jews to their homeland and the rebuilding of the Temple, a Messianic Age of peace and understanding during which "the knowledge of God" fills the earth." And since Jews believe that none of these events occurred during the lifetime of Jesus (nor have they occurred afterwards), he is not the Messiah for them.

Traditional views of Jesus have been mostly negative (see Toledot Yeshu, an account that portrays Jesus as an impostor), although in the Middle Ages, Judah Halevi and Maimonides viewed Jesus as an important preparatory figure for a future universal ethical monotheism of the Messianic Age. Some modern Jewish thinkers, starting in the 18th century with the Orthodox Jacob Emden and the reformer Moses Mendelssohn, have sympathetically argued that the historical Jesus may have been closer to Judaism than either the Gospels or traditional Jewish accounts would indicate.

== Post-Temple and medieval views ==
=== Talmud ===
The Talmud extensively discusses the coming of the Messiah (Sanhedrin 98a–99a, et al.) and describes a period of freedom and peace, which will be the time of ultimate goodness for the Jews. Tractate Sanhedrin contains a long discussion of the events leading to the coming of the Messiah. (Note: "R. Johanan said: When you see a generation ever dwindling, hope for him [the Messiah], as it is written, "And the afflicted people thou wilt save."[II Samuel 22:28] R. Johanan said: When thou seest a generation overwhelmed by many troubles as by a river, await him, as it is written, "When the enemy shall come in like a flood, the Spirit of the Lord shall lift up a standard against him;" which is followed by, "And the Redeemer shall come to Zion." R. Johanan also said: The son of David will come only in a generation that is either altogether righteous or altogether wicked. In a generation that is altogether righteous — as it is written, "Thy people also shall be all righteous: they shall inherit the land for ever." Or altogether wicked — as it is written, "And he saw that there was no man, and wondered that there was no intercessor"; and it is [elsewhere] written, "For mine own sake, even for mine own sake, will I do it.") The Talmud tells many stories about the Messiah, some of which represent famous Talmudic rabbis as receiving personal visitations from Elijah the Prophet and the Messiah. (Note: R. Joshua b. Levi met Elijah standing by the entrance of R. Simeon b. Yohai's tomb. He asked him: "Have I a portion in the world to come?" He replied, "If this Master desires it." R. Joshua b. Levi said, "I saw two, but heard the voice of a third." He then asked him, "When will the Messiah come?" — "Go and ask him himself", was his reply. "Where is he sitting?" — "At the entrance." — "And by what sign may I recognise him?" — "He is sitting among the poor lepers: All of them untie [them] all at once, and rebandage them together, whereas he unties and rebandages each separately, [before treating the next], thinking, should I be wanted, [it being time for my appearance as the Messiah] I must not be delayed [through having to bandage a number of sores]." So he went to him and greeted him, saying, "Peace upon thee, Master and Teacher." "Peace upon thee, O son of Levi", he replied. "When wilt thou come, Master?" asked he. "Today", was his answer. On his returning to Elijah, the latter enquired, "What did he say to thee?" — "peace Upon thee, O son of Levi", he answered. Thereupon he [Elijah] observed, "He thereby assured thee and thy father of [a portion in] the world to come." "He spoke falsely to me", he rejoined, "stating that he would come today, but has not." He [Elijah] answered him, "This is what he said to thee, To-day, if ye will listen to his voice.")

=== Midrash ===
There are innumerable references to the Messiah in Midrashic literature, where they often stretch the meaning of biblical verses. One such reference is found in the Midrash HaGadol (on Genesis 36:39) where Abba bar Kahana says: "What is meant by, 'In that day the root of Jesse, who shall stand as an ensign for the peoples, of him shall the nations inquire, and his rest shall be glorious' (Isaiah 11:10)? It means that when the banner of the anointed king shall be lifted-up, all the masts of ships belonging to the nations of the world shall be broken, while all the lines (halyard, downhaul and sheets) are cut loose, while all ships are broken asunder, and none of them remain excepting the banner of the son of David, as it says: 'who shall stand as an ensign for the peoples'. Likewise, when the banner of the son of David shall arise, all the languages belonging to the nations shall be made useless, and their customs shall be rendered null and void. The nations, at that time, will learn from the Messiah, as it says: 'of him shall the nations inquire' (ibid.); 'and his rest shall be glorious', meaning, he gives to them satisfaction, and tranquility, and they dwell in peace and quiet."

=== Maimonides ===
The influential Jewish philosopher Maimonides discussed the messiah in his Mishneh Torah, his 14-volume compendium of Jewish law, in the section Hilkhot Melakhim Umilchamoteihem, chapters 11 & 12. (Note: Maimonides writes: "The anointed king is destined to stand up and restore the Davidic Kingdom to its antiquity, to the first sovereignty. He will build the Temple in Jerusalem and gather the strayed ones of Israel together. All laws will return in his days as they were before: Sacrificial offerings are offered and the Sabbatical years and Jubilees are kept, according to all its precepts that are mentioned in the Torah. Whoever does not believe in him, or whoever does not wait for his coming, not only does he defy the other prophets, but also the Torah and Moses our teacher. For the Torah testifies about him, thus: "And the Lord Your God will return your returned ones and will show you mercy and will return and gather you... If your strayed one shall be at the edge of Heaven... And He shall bring you" etc.(Deuteronomy 30:3–5)."; "These words that are explicitly stated in the Torah, encompass and include all the words spoken by all the prophets. In the section of Torah referring to Bala'am, too, it is stated, and there he prophesied about the two anointed ones: The first anointed one is David, who saved Israel from all their oppressors; and the last anointed one will stand up from among his descendants and saves Israel in the end. This is what he says (Numbers 24:17–18): "I see him but not now" – this is David; "I behold him but not near" – this is the anointed king. "A star has shot forth from Jacob" – this is David; "And a brand will rise up from Israel" – this is the anointed king. "And he will smash the edges of Moab" – This is David, as it states: "...And he struck Moab and measured them by rope" (II Samuel 8:2); "And he will uproot all Children of Seth" – this is the anointed king, of whom it is stated: "And his reign shall be from sea to sea" (Zechariah 9:10). "And Edom shall be possessed" – this is David, thus: "And Edom became David's as slaves etc." (II Samuel 8:6); "And Se'ir shall be possessed by its enemy" – this is the anointed king, thus: "And saviors shall go up Mount Zion to judge Mount Esau, and the Kingdom shall be the Lord's" (Obadiah 1:21)."; "And by the Towns of Refuge it states: "And if the Lord your God will widen up your territory... you shall add on for you another three towns" etc. (Deuteronomy 19:8–9). Now this thing never happened; and the Holy One does not command in vain. But as for the words of the prophets, this matter needs no proof, as all their books are full with this issue."; "Do not imagine that the anointed king must perform miracles and signs and create new things in the world or resurrect the dead and so on. The matter is not so: For Rabbi Akiva was a great scholar of the sages of the Mishnah, and he was the assistant-warrior of the king Bar Kokhba, and claimed that he was the anointed king. He and all the Sages of his generation deemed him the anointed king, until he was killed by sins; only since he was killed, they knew that he was not. The Sages asked him neither a miracle nor a sign..."; "And if a king shall arise from among the House of David, studying Torah and indulging in commandments like his father David, according to the written and oral Torah, and he will impel all of Israel to follow it and to strengthen breaches in its observance, and will fight Hashem's [God's] wars, this one is to be treated as if he were the anointed one. If he succeeded and built a Holy Temple in its proper place and gathered the dispersed ones of Israel together, this is indeed the anointed one for certain, and he will mend the entire world to worship the Lord together, as it is stated: "For then I shall turn for the nations a clear tongue, to call all in the Name of the Lord and to worship Him with one shoulder (Zephaniah 3:9)."; "But if he did not succeed to this degree, or if he was killed, it becomes known that he is not this one of whom the Torah had promised us, and he is indeed like all proper and wholesome kings of the House of David who died. The Holy One, Blessed Be He, only set him up to try the public by him, thus: "Some of the wise men will stumble in clarifying these words, and in elucidating and interpreting when the time of the end will be, for it is not yet the designated time." (Daniel 11:35).") According to Maimonides, Jesus of Nazareth is not the Messiah, as is claimed by Christians. (Note: "As for Jesus of Nazareth, who claimed to be the anointed one and was condemned by the Sanhedrin. Daniel had already prophesied about him, thus: 'And the children of your people's rebels shall raise themselves to set up prophecy and will stumble.' Maimonides. Mishneh Torah, Sefer Shofetim, Melachim uMilchamot, Chapter 11, Halacha 4. Chabad translation by Eliyahu Touge. Can there be a bigger stumbling block than this? All the Prophets said that the anointed one saves Israel and rescues them, gathers their strayed ones and strengthens their mitzvot whereas this one caused the loss of Israel by sword, and to scatter their remnant and humiliate them, and to change the Torah and to cause most of the world to erroneously worship a god besides the Lord. But the human mind has no power to reach the thoughts of the Creator, for his thoughts and ways are unlike ours. All these matters of Yeshu of Nazareth and of Muhammad who stood up after him are only intended to pave the way for the anointed king, and to mend the entire world to worship God together, thus: 'For then I shall turn a clear tongue to the nations to call all in the Name of the Lord and to worship him with one shoulder.'" "How is this? The entire world had become filled with the issues of the anointed one and of the Torah and the Laws, and these issues had spread out unto faraway islands and among many nations uncircumcised in the heart, and they discuss these issues and the Torah's laws. These say: These Laws were true but are already defunct in these days, and do not rule for the following generations; whereas the other ones say: There are secret layers in them and they are not to be treated literally, and the Messiah had come and revealed their secret meanings. But when the anointed king will truly rise and succeed and will be raised and uplifted, they all immediately turn about and know that their fathers inherited falsehood, and their prophets and ancestors led them astray.")

Maimonides, citing a reference in the Talmud (Sanhedrin 91b), says: "There is no difference between this world and the days of the Messiah, excepting only the subjugation of kingdoms."

=== Spanish Inquisition ===
Following the expulsion of Jews from Spain in 1492, many Spanish rabbis such as Abraham ben Eliezer Halevi believed that the year 1524 would be the beginning of the Messianic Age and that the Messiah himself would appear in 1530–1531.

== Contemporary Jewish views ==
=== Orthodox Judaism ===
Orthodox Judaism maintains the 13 Principles of Faith as formulated by Maimonides in his introduction to Chapter Helek of the Mishna Torah. Each principle starts with the words Ani Maamin (I believe). Number 12 is the main principle relating to Mashiach. Orthodox Jews strictly believe in a Messiah, life after death, and restoration of the Promised Land:

I believe with full faith in the coming of the Messiah. And even though he tarries, with all that, I await his arrival with every day. (Note: אני מאמין באמונה שלמה בביאת המשיח, ואף על פי שיתמהמה עם כל זה אחכה לו בכל יום שיבוא Ani Maamin B'emunah Sh'leimah B'viyat Hamashiach. V'af al pi sheyitmahmehah im kol zeh achake lo b'chol yom sheyavo.)

==== Hasidic Judaism ====
Hasidic Jews tend to have a particularly strong and passionate belief in the immediacy of the Messiah's coming, and in the ability of their actions to hasten his arrival. Because of the supposed piety, wisdom, and leadership abilities of the Hasidic Masters, members of Hasidic communities are sometimes inclined to regard their dynastic rebbes as potential candidates for Messiah. Many Jews (see the Bartenura's explanation on Megillat Rut, and the Halakhic responsa of The Ch'sam Sofer on Choshen Mishpat [vol. 6], Chapter 98 where this view is explicit), especially Hasidim, adhere to the belief that there is a person born each generation with the potential to become Messiah, if the Jewish people warrant his coming; this candidate is known as the Tzadik Ha-Dor, meaning Tzaddik of the Generation. However, fewer are likely to name a candidate.

==== Chabad messianism ====
Rabbi Menachem Mendel Schneerson, the last Rebbe of Chabad-Lubavitch, declared often that the Messiah is very close, urging all to pray for the coming of the Messiah and to do everything possible to hasten the coming of the Messiah through increased acts of kindness. Starting in the late 1960s, the Rebbe called for his followers to become involved in outreach activities with the purpose of bringing about the Jewish Messianic Age, which led to controversy surrounding the messianic beliefs of Chabad. Some Chabad Hasidim, called mashichists, "have not yet accepted the Rebbe's passing" and even after his death regard him as the (living) 'King Messiah' and 'Moses of the generation', awaiting his second coming.

The "Chabad-Messianic question", regarding a dead Messiah, got oppositional addresses from a halachic perspective by many prominent Orthodox authorities, including leaders from the Ashkenazi non-Hasidic Lithuanian (Litvak) institutions, Ponevezh yeshiva in Bnei Brak, Israel, and got vehement opposition, notably that of the Yeshivas Chofetz Chaim (RSA) in New York and that of the Rabbinical Council of America.

=== Conservative Judaism ===
Emet Ve-Emunah, the Conservative movement's statement of principles, states the following:

Since no one can say for certain what will happen "in the days to come" each of us is free to fashion personal speculative visions ... Though some of us accept these speculations as literally true, many of us understand them as elaborate metaphors ... For the world community we dream of an age when warfare will be abolished, when justice and compassion will be the axioms of interpersonal and international relationships and when, in Isaiah's words (11:9) "...the land shall be filled with the knowledge of the Lord as the waters cover the sea." For our people, we dream of the ingathering of all Jews to Zion where we can again be masters of our destiny and express our distinctive genius in every area of our national life.... We affirm Isaiah's prophecy (2:3) that "...Torah shall come forth from Zion, the word of the Lord from Jerusalem. ... We do not know when the Messiah will come, nor whether he will be a charismatic human figure or is a symbol of the redemption of humankind from the evils of the world. Through the doctrine of a messianic figure, Judaism teaches us that every individual human being must live as if he or she, individually, has the responsibility to bring about the messianic age. Beyond that, we echo the words of Maimonides based on the prophet Habakkuk (2:3) that though he may tarry, yet do we wait for him each day.

=== Reform and Reconstructionist Judaism ===
Reform Judaism and Reconstructionist Judaism generally do not accept the idea that there will be a Messiah. Some believe that there may be some sort of Messianic Age (the World to Come) in the sense of a utopia, which all Jews are obligated to work towards (thus the tradition of Tikkun olam). In 1999, the Central Conference of American Rabbis, the official body of American Reform rabbis, authored "A Statement of Principles for Reform Judaism", meant to describe and define the spiritual state of modern Reform Judaism. (Note: In a commentary appended to the platform, it states: "The 1885 Pittsburgh Platform rejected the traditional Jewish hope for an heir of King David to arise when the world was ready to acknowledge that heir as the one anointed (the original meaning of mashiach, anglicized into "messiah"). This figure would rule in God's name over all people and ultimately usher in a time of justice, truth and peace. In the Avot, the first prayer of the Amidah, Reformers changed the prayerbook's hope for a go-el, a redeemer, to geulah, redemption. Originally this idea reflected the views of Georg Wilhelm Friedrich Hegel and the French Positivist philosophers that society was growing ever more enlightened. The cataclysmic events of the first half of the 20th century smashed that belief, and most Reform Jews saw the Messianic Age as a time that would probably be far off. Still, we renew our hope for it when we express the belief that Shabbat is mey-eyn olam ha-ba, a sampler of the world to come, when we sing about Elijah, herald of the messiah, when Havdalah brings Shabbat to a close, when we open the door for Elijah late in the Pesach Seder, and when we express the hope in the first paragraph of the Kaddish that God's sovereignty will be established in our days.")

=== Karaite Judaism ===
Karaite Judaism holds to Elijah Bashyazi and Caleb Afendopolo's 10 principles of Karaite belief, with the tenth one being about the Messiah:

God does not despise those living in exile; on the contrary. He desires to purify them through their sufferings and they may hope for his help every day and for redemption by Him through the Messiah of the seed of David.

== Calculation of appearance ==
According to the Talmud, the Midrash, and the Zohar, the "deadline" by which the Messiah must appear is 6000 years from creation (approximately the year 2239 or 2240 in the Gregorian calendar, though calculations vary). (Note: 6000 years: The Talmud comments: "R. Katina said, "Six thousand years the world will exist and one [thousand, the seventh], it shall be desolate (haruv), as it is written, 'And the Lord alone shall be exalted in that day' (Isa. 2:11)... R. Katina also taught, "Just as the seventh year is the Shmita year, so too does the world have one thousand years out of seven that are fallow (mushmat), as it is written, 'And the Lord alone shall be exalted in that day' (Isa. 2:11); and further it is written, 'A psalm and song for the Shabbat day' (Ps. 92:1) – meaning the day that is altogether Shabbat – and also it is said, 'For a thousand years in Thy sight are but as yesterday when it is past'."; The Midrash comments: "Six eons for going in and coming out, for war and peace. The seventh eon is entirely Shabbat and rest for life everlasting."; The Zohar explains: "The redemption of Israel will come about through the mystic force of the letter "Vav" [which has the numerical value of six], namely, in the sixth millennium.... Happy are those who will be left alive at the end of the sixth millennium to enter the Shabbat, which is the millennium; for that is a day set apart for the Holy One on which to effect the union of new souls with old souls in the world."; A kabbalistic tradition maintains that the seven days of creation in Genesis 1 correspond to seven millennia of the existence of natural creation. The tradition teaches that the seventh day of the week, Shabbat or the day of rest, corresponds to the seventh millennium (Hebrew years 6000 - 7000), the age of universal 'rest' - the Messianic Era.) Elaborating on this theme are early and late Jewish scholars, including Nahmanides, Isaac Abarbanel, Abraham ibn Ezra, Bahya ibn Paquda, the Vilna Gaon, Menachem Mendel Schneerson, the Moshe Chaim Luzzatto, Aryeh Kaplan, and Rebbetzin Esther Jungreis.

== See also ==
- Armilus
- Old Testament messianic prophecies quoted in the New Testament
- List of Jewish messiah claimants
- Year 6000

== Sources ==
Printed sources

- Avery-Peck, Alan J., ed. (2005), The Review of Rabbinic Judaism: Ancient, Medieval, and Modern, Martinus Nijhoff Publishers, ISBN 9004144846
- Boyarin, Daniel (2012), The Jewish Gospels: The Story of the Jewish Christ, New Press, ISBN 9781595584687
- Cohen, Shaye J.D. (1987), From the Maccabees to the Mishnah, The Westminster Press, ISBN 0-664-25017-3
- Cohen, Shaye J.D. (2002). From the Maccabees to the Mishnah. Westminster John Knox Press. ISBN 9780664227432.
- Cohen, Shaye J.D. (2014), From the Maccabees to the Mishnah. Third edition, Westminster John Knox Press, ISBN 9780664239046
- Collins, Adela Yarbro; Collins, John J. (2008), King and Messiah as Son of God: Divine, Human, and Angelic Messianic Figures in Biblical and Related Literature, Eerdmans
- Enns, Paul P. (2008), The Moody Handbook of Theology, Moody Publishers
- Grabbe, Lester L. (2002a), Judaic Religion in the Second Temple Period: Belief and Practice from the Exile to Yavneh, Routledge, ISBN 9780203461013
- Grabbe, Lester L. (2002b), "A Dan(iel) For All Seasons", in Collins, John J.; Flint, Peter W.; VanEpps, Cameron (eds.), The Book of Daniel: Composition and Reception, BRILL, ISBN 978-9004116757
- Klausner, Joseph (1955), The Messianic Idea in Israel: From Its Beginning to the Completion of the Mishnah, translated by W. F. Stinespring (from the Third Hebrew Edition) (Third ed.), New York: The Macmillan Company
- Knohl, Israel (2000), The Messiah Before Jesus: The Suffering Servant of the Dead Sea Scrolls, University of California Press, ISBN 9780520928749
- Schäfer, Peter (2012), The Jewish Jesus: How Judaism and Christianity Shaped Each Other, Princeton University Press, pp. 235–238, ISBN 9781400842285
- Schwartz, Daniel R. (1992), Studies in the Jewish Background of Christianity, Mohr Siebeck, ISBN 9783161457982
- VanderKam, James C. (2003), "Messianism and Apocalyticism", in McGinn, Bernard; Collins, John J.; Stein, Stephen (eds.), The Continuum History of Apocalypticism, A&C Black
