= Siege of Jerusalem (70 CE) =

Part of the First Jewish–Roman War

- Part of the First Jewish–Roman War
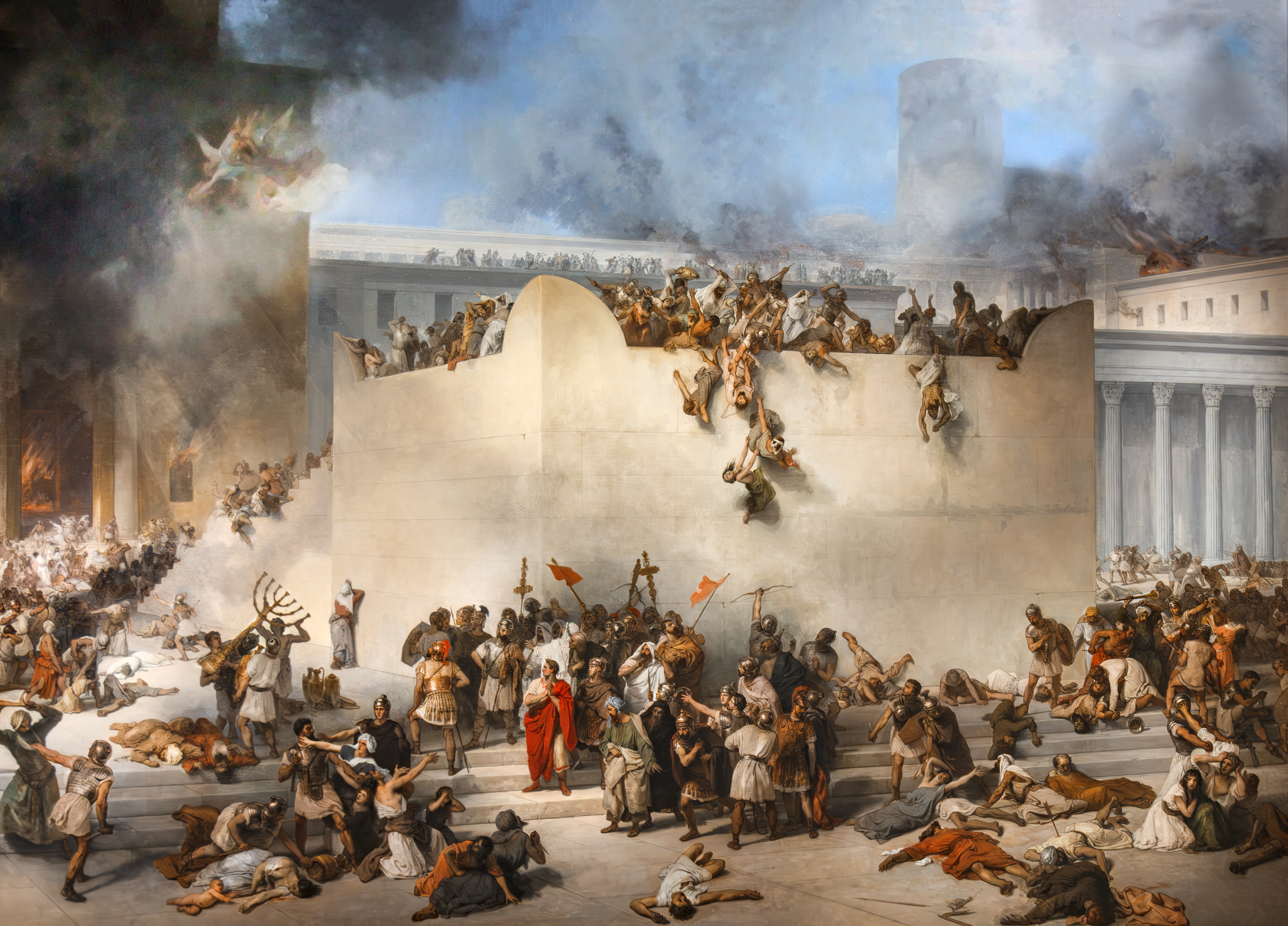
- The Destruction of the Temple of Jerusalem (Francesco Hayez, 1867)
Date	13 April – 8 September 70 CE (4 months, 3 weeks and 5 days)
Location	Jerusalem, then part of Judaea 31°46′41″N 35°14′9″E
Result	Roman victory

Belligerents
Roman Empire	Jewish rebels

Commanders and leaders
Titus; Julius Alexander	Simon bar Giora (executed); John of Gischala (POW); Eleazar ben Simon †

Strength
48,200 (minimum)	23,400

The siege of Jerusalem in 70 CE was the decisive event of the First Jewish Revolt against the Roman Empire (66–73 CE). Roman forces led by Titus, son of the emperor Vespasian, besieged Jerusalem, the Jewish capital and the revolt's main stronghold. After months of fighting, they breached the defenses, destroyed the Second Temple, and razed the city. Much of its population was killed, enslaved, or displaced by the Romans. The city's fall marked the effective end of the revolt and a turning point in Jewish history.

In winter 69–70, following a respite in the revolt's suppression caused by a succession war in Rome, Titus led four legions and auxiliary forces, numbering at least 48,200 soldiers, back into Judaea. By spring, this army had encircled Jerusalem, whose population had swollen with refugees and Passover pilgrims. Inside the city, rival factions led by John of Gischala, Simon bar Giora, and Eleazar ben Simon fought each other, destroying the city's food supplies and weakening its defenses. The factions eventually united and mounted fierce resistance, but the Romans breached the walls and drove the defenders into the Temple precincts.

In the month of Av (July/August), the Romans captured the Temple Mount and destroyed the Second Temple—an event commemorated annually in Judaism on Tisha B'Av. The rest of Jerusalem fell in the following weeks, and the Romans systematically demolished most of the city. A year later, Titus and Vespasian celebrated the victory with a triumph in Rome, parading Temple spoils—including the menorah—alongside hundreds of captives. The victory was later commemorated in monuments such as the Arch of Titus and on the Judaea capta coinage.

With sacrificial worship no longer possible, Judaism gradually reoriented around Torah study, acts of loving-kindness, and synagogue prayer, a development that culminated in Rabbinic Judaism. Some early Christians interpreted the destruction as a sign that God had turned away from the Jewish people, lending support to supersessionist theology. After the war, Legio X Fretensis established a permanent garrison on the site. Recalling the city's restoration after its destruction in 587/586 BCE, many Jews expected the Temple to be rebuilt, but it remained in ruins. In 130, the emperor Hadrian re-founded Jerusalem as Aelia Capitolina, a Roman colony dedicated to Jupiter, paving the way for the last major Jewish rebellion: the Bar Kokhba Revolt.

== Background ==
=== Jerusalem on the eve of the revolt ===
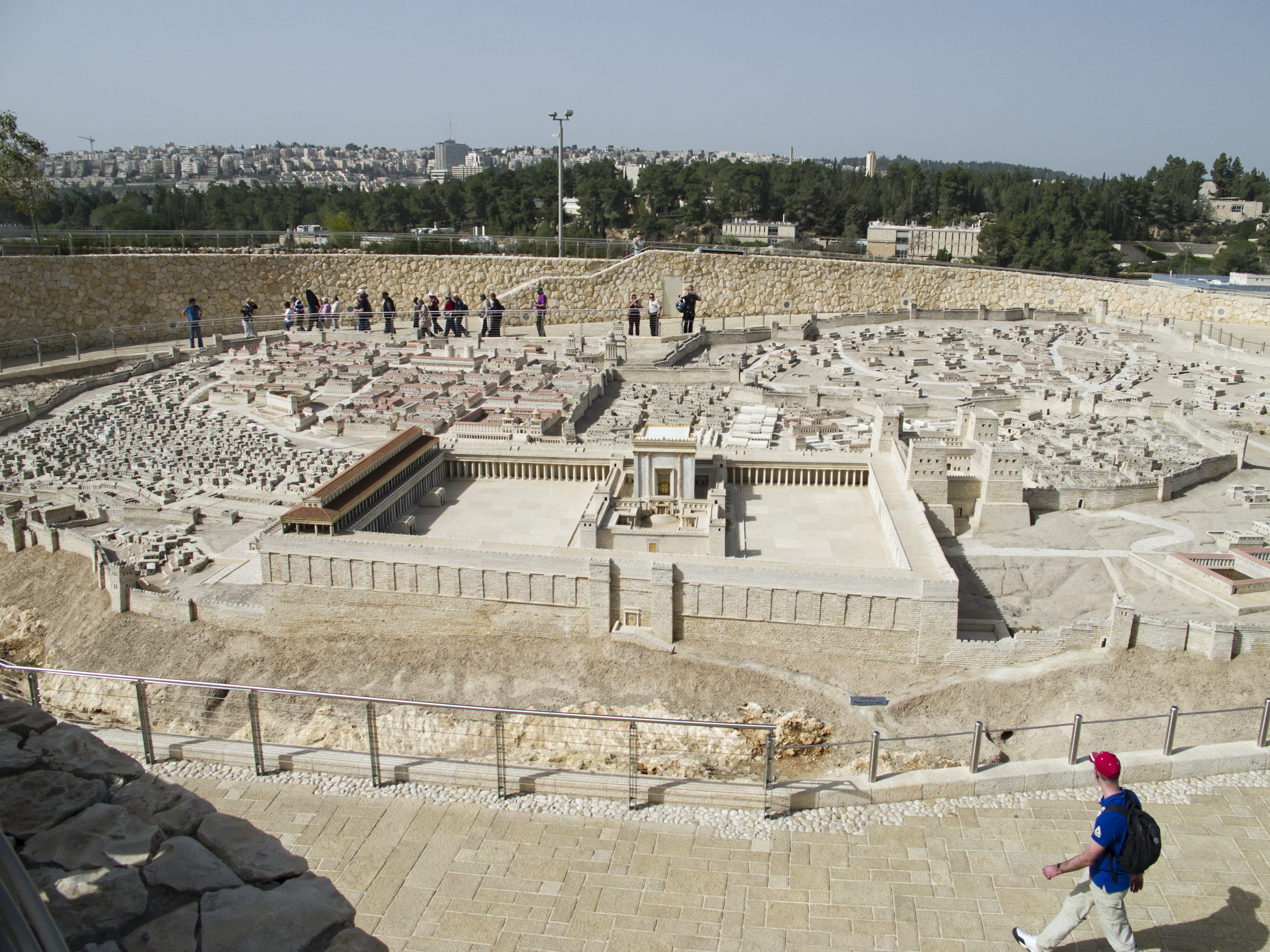
A scale model reconstruction of Jerusalem during the 1st century CE, part of the Holyland Model of Jerusalem at the Israel Museum

Jerusalem was a prosperous city during the first century CE, serving as the religious and political center of Jewish life both in Judaea and the diaspora. The city had reached its greatest extent before the modern era, covering about 450 acres (180 ha)—nearly twice the size of the present-day Old City—and was home to tens of thousands of residents. (Note: Historian Jonathan Price notes estimates ranging from 25,000 to over 150,000 residents. Archaeologist Magen Broshi estimated the population at around 80,000, while Orit Peleg-Barkat suggests a range of 50,000 to 80,000 people.)

Jerusalem was organized into several districts. (Note: The ancient Jewish historian Josephus remains the single most important source for reconstructing Jerusalem's urban layout on the eve of its fall.) The Upper City, on the southwestern hill, was the city's wealthiest quarter and was home to the elite, including many priestly families. The Lower City, on the southeastern hill, was more densely populated. The city's foremost landmark was the Temple Mount, crowned by the Second Temple. The Temple had long been central to Jewish national and religious identity, (Note: It succeeded Solomon's Temple, which was destroyed by the Babylonians in 587/586 BCE and was rebuilt in the late 6th century BCE during the Return to Zion.) and under King Herod (r. 37 to 4 BCE), it was expanded and rebuilt on a monumental scale, making the complex one of the largest religious precincts in the ancient world. The complex also hosted popular assemblies and judicial proceedings, and housed one of the city's largest marketplaces. Its upkeep was funded in part by an annual half-shekel tax levied on Jewish adults, roughly equivalent to two days' wages for an ordinary laborer.

During the Three Pilgrimage Festivals, (Note: The holidays of Passover, Shavuot (Pentecost), and Sukkot (Tabernacles), during which each Israelite male was required by the Torah to "appear before the Lord".) tens of thousands of visitors from Judaea and abroad traveled to Jerusalem to take part in Temple rituals—an influx that was a major source of the city's wealth. Rabbinic sources describing Jerusalem during the late Second Temple period praise its unparalleled beauty. Avot de-Rabbi Natan, a late antique rabbinic work, states that "There is no beauty like the beauty of Jerusalem", while the Babylonian Talmud declares that no one who never saw Jerusalem in its splendor has seen a beautiful city. Jerusalem's reputation extended well beyond Jewish circles: the Roman author Pliny the Elder, writing a few years after its destruction, retrospectively called it "by far the most famous city of the East"; the historian Tacitus, in a work published three decades after the city's destruction, described it as "the capital of the Jews" and noted a temple of "enormous reaches".

=== Jerusalem's defenses ===
Jerusalem was bounded by the Kidron Valley to the east and the Hinnom Valley to the south and west. These natural defenses were reinforced by successive lines of fortification. The First Wall enclosed both the Lower and Upper City and formed the core of Jerusalem. It was constructed in the 2nd century BCE by the Hasmonean kings on the foundations of an earlier wall dating to the kings of Judah. As the city grew, the Second Wall was added further north to protect newer neighborhoods and commercial districts. Continued expansion in the early 40s CE led the Jewish client king Herod Agrippa to begin building the "Third Wall," enclosing the new northern suburb of Bezetha. (Note: Settled in the first century CE, its name is Aramaic for 'olive grove'.) The Roman emperor Claudius halted its construction, perhaps fearing rebellion or simply due to Agrippa's death. The wall was completed only hastily after the revolt had begun.

Map of Jerusalem in the 1st century CE

The city's defenses also included fortified structures. The Antonia Fortress, positioned at the Temple Mount's northwestern corner, served as both barracks and palace, overlooking the Temple complex. In the western Upper City, north of Herod's Palace, stood another fortified complex (on the site of the present-day Tower of David), enclosed by walls and guarded by three towers named Phasael, Hippicus, and Mariamne.

Jerusalem's large population could not be sustained by local agriculture alone, and the city therefore relied heavily on food imported from elsewhere in Judea, as well as from Samaria, Galilee, and regions farther afield. The city also maintained food reserves. Its water supply relied on large rain-collecting pools, channels drawing from sources such as the Gihon Spring, and aqueducts that brought water from the area near Bethlehem and beyond. During the revolt, the influx of refugees and insurgents swelled the population further, leaving the city increasingly vulnerable to famine.

=== Jerusalem during the revolt ===
In the spring of 66 CE, violence broke out between Jews and Greeks in Caesarea Maritima, the Roman provincial capital on the coast of Judaea. Gessius Florus, the Roman procurator, arrived in Jerusalem soon after and seized funds from the Temple treasury. The act triggered widespread unrest, which Florus suppressed with a massacre of civilians. Florus subsequently fled the city; the client king Agrippa II, having failed to dissuade the population from rebellion, was driven out shortly after. The Temple's segan (deputy), Eleazar ben Hanania, then halted the daily sacrifices offered on behalf of the emperor.

The radical Sicarii faction, led by Menahem ben Judah, raided the desert fortress of Masada and seized weapons. Menahem armed his followers and joined the revolt in Jerusalem, where he emerged as a leading figure. The insurgents drove the king's soldiers from the Upper City and burned the house of Eleazar's father, the high priest Ananias, (Note: The Sicarii had for years engaged in targeted violence against Jews perceived as too accommodating toward Roman rule.) the royal palaces, and the public archives containing debt records. The rebels then captured the Antonia Fortress and besieged Herod's Palace. The Jewish defenders were allowed to surrender, while the Roman soldiers withdrew to the towers of Hippicus, Phasaelus, and Mariamne. The following day, Ananias was killed by the Sicarii, along with his brother. Menahem appeared in public in royal attire before being killed along with many of his followers by Eleazar's faction; a few survivors escaped to Masada, including Menahem's relative Eleazar ben Yair, who later became its leader. In mid-September, the remaining Roman soldiers, negotiating with Eleazar ben Hanania, surrendered after being promised safe passage out of the city, but were nevertheless massacred by his men. (Note: The sole survivor was the Roman commander Metilius, who was spared after pledging to convert to Judaism and undergo circumcision.)

With Jerusalem in open revolt, Gaius Cestius Gallus, the governor of Roman Syria, marched into Judaea in the fall of 66 to suppress the rebellion. He advanced on Jerusalem with an army of approximately 30,000 soldiers, reaching Mount Scopus and burning the northern suburb of Bezetha. He then retreated unexpectedly (Note: Josephus suggested that Gallus could have captured the city with more determination. Modern historians have proposed various explanations. Menahem Stern suggested that Gallus, facing strong resistance, doubted he could seize the city; E. Mary Smallwood proposed that he may have been concerned about the approaching winter, a lack of siege equipment, the risk of ambushes in the hills, and the potential insincerity of the moderates' offer to open the gates.) and in Cheshvan (October/November) 66 was ambushed by Jewish forces at Bethoron, losing nearly an entire legion. Following Gallus's defeat, a provisional Jewish government was established in Jerusalem, appointing commanders across the country and completing the city's Third Wall. John of Gischala led an independent rebel faction in Galilee, while Simon bar Giora led another in Judea.

In 67, the Roman emperor Nero appointed the general Vespasian to suppress the revolt. Vespasian conducted a methodical campaign across Galilee, subduing rebel strongholds one by one. Meanwhile, Jerusalem grew increasingly unstable as refugees and rebel factions, including John of Gischala and his followers, poured into the city. The Zealots, a priestly anti-Roman faction led by Eleazar ben Simon, and the Idumaeans (Note: A group residing south of Judaea, the Idumaeans were converted to Judaism by the Hasmonean leader John Hyrcanus after their conquest in the second century BCE.) overthrew the city's moderate leadership. (Note: The Zealots, encouraged by John of Gischala, invited the Idumaeans into Jerusalem under the pretext that the moderate leadership was betraying the city to Rome. The Idumaeans entered during a storm and, together with the Zealots, massacred soldiers, priests, and civilians. Many Idumaeans later withdrew in regret; others went on to join Simon bar Giora.) By 68, Vespasian had subdued most of Judaea, but Nero's suicide plunged Rome into the succession conflict known as the Year of the Four Emperors. Vespasian postponed the siege of Jerusalem; he reportedly preferred to let the rival Jewish factions exhaust one another while he waited for the spring harvest. In 69, Vespasian was proclaimed imperator by his troops and departed for Italy to secure the imperial throne, entrusting command of the campaign to his son, Titus.

In Jerusalem itself, civil war broke out among the rebel factions. By spring 69, Simon bar Giora's forces were camped outside the city, attacking deserters, while radical factions inside terrorized the population. Hoping to weaken John of Gischala, his opponents admitted Simon to the city. However, Simon's arrival deepened the conflict instead. Josephus, a captured Jewish commander who observed the siege from the Roman side and later chronicled the war under Roman patronage, describes Jerusalem as descending into a three-way civil war, with each faction fighting the other two; Tacitus similarly notes that the city was divided among three generals and three armies. John of Gischala, Eleazar ben Simon, and Simon bar Giora divided the city between them: John held most of the Temple Mount and the southeastern hill, Eleazar the inner Temple court, and Simon, with the largest force, the remainder. In the course of the fighting, the warring factions burned the city's food stores, destroying provisions that would have been critical once the siege began.

=== Reported omens before the destruction ===
Josephus recounts several omens said to have foretold the destruction of Jerusalem in the years before it fell. Among those were "a star resembling a sword, which stood over the city, and a comet that continued a whole year"—possibly Halley's Comet, which was visible over Jerusalem in the winter and spring of 66. Other reported signs included a sudden bright light around the Temple altar near the festival of Passover, a cow giving birth to a lamb, and the massive eastern gate of the Temple's inner sanctuary swinging open on its own. Josephus also reports armies in the sky before sunset, and recounts that during the pilgrimage festival of Shavuot, priests in the Temple heard a loud noise followed by a voice declaring, "We are departing from here." Beginning four years before the revolt, a peasant named Jesus ben Ananias wandered the city prophesying its destruction, continuing to do so for more than seven years until he was killed by a Roman projectile during the siege.

== Titus's march on Jerusalem and early engagements ==
In winter 69/70, Titus marched from Egypt through the coastal plain to Caesarea Maritima, where he established his main base. Four legions—V Macedonica, X Fretensis, XII Fulminata, and XV Apollinaris—formed the core of his army, supported by detachments of the Legio III Cyrenaica and the Legio XXII Deiotariana from Egypt, twenty infantry cohorts, eight cavalry alae, Syrian irregulars, and auxiliaries supplied by allied client kings. Tacitus also records the participation of "a strong force of Arabs", whom he described as driven by longstanding hostility toward Jews. In total, this combined force numbered at least 48,200 soldiers, making it considerably larger than the force deployed for the invasion of Britain in 43 CE. Titus's second-in-command was Tiberius Julius Alexander, a Jewish-born equestrian governor and general who had reportedly renounced his ancestral traditions.

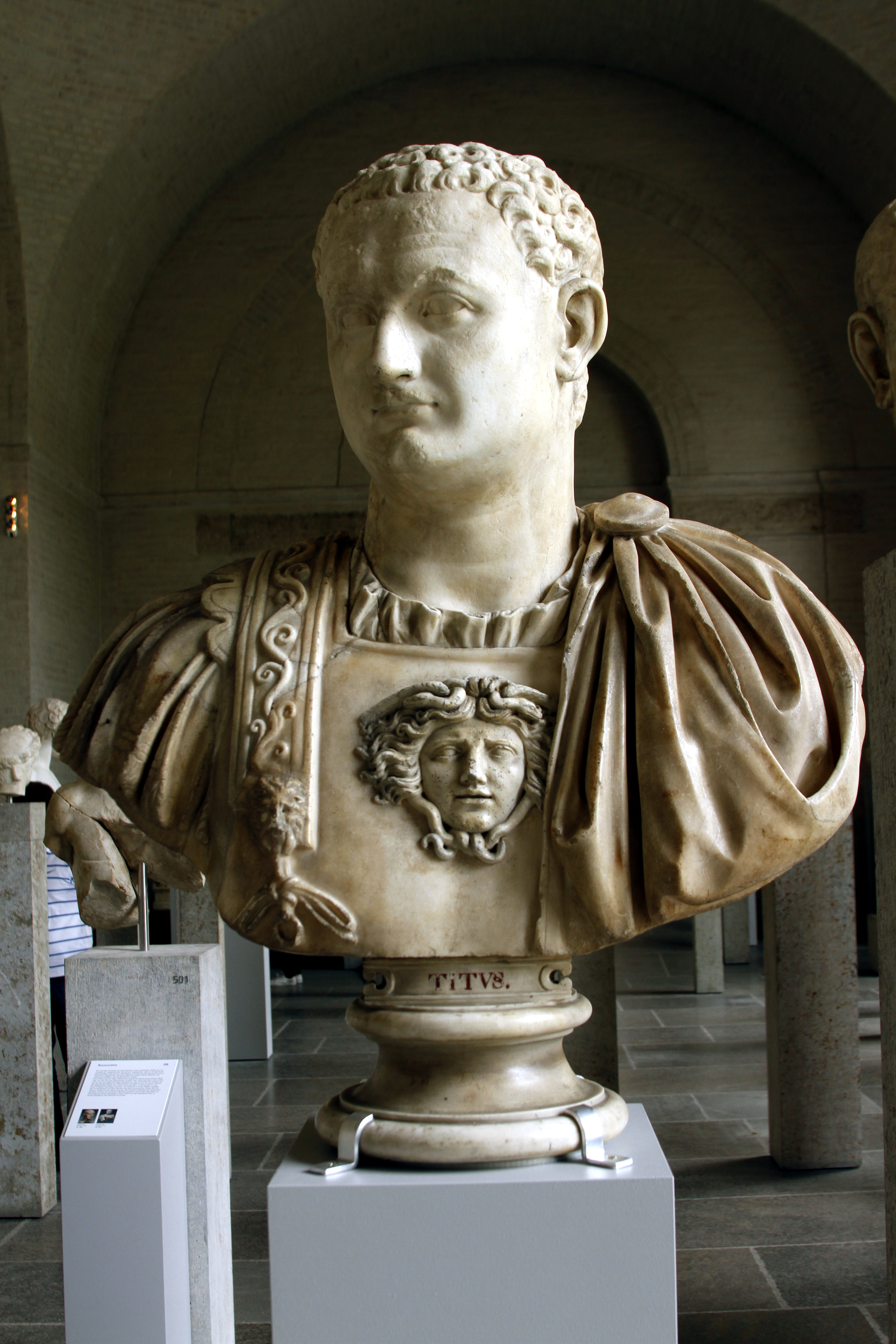
Marble bust of Titus, son of emperor Vespasian, who returned to Judaea in the winter of 69/70 at the head of an army of some 48,200

Meanwhile, infighting continued within Jerusalem. Eleazar ben Simon had fortified his position in the Temple's inner court, seizing its stores of consecrated first fruits. John of Gischala attacked him from below the Temple's sacred gates, while Simon bar Giora, who held the Upper and Lower cities, struck at John in turn. The factions employed artillery in the fighting, killing many, including among priests and worshippers.

In early Nisan 70 (March/April), Titus set out from Caesarea Maritima with Legio XII Fulminata and Legio XV Apollinaris, marching toward Jerusalem. The Roman army advanced through Samaria, halting to rest at Gophna, about 13 miles (21 km) north of Jerusalem. Meanwhile, Legio V Macedonica, under Sextus Vettulenus Cerialis, approached from the west via Emmaus, while Legio X Fretensis, commanded by Aulus Larcius Lepidus Sulpicianus, advanced from the east through Jericho. Titus's own force then made camp in the "Valley of Thorns" near Gibeah, about 3 miles (4.8 km) from Jerusalem. Like earlier commanders who had attacked the city—Sennacherib, Nebuchadnezzar II, Pompey, and Herod—Titus directed his assault against Jerusalem's northern and northeastern flanks, the only sides not protected by ravines.

Tacitus put the number of people besieged in Jerusalem at 600,000, including "every age and both sexes". He states that "all who were able bore arms", and regarded death as preferable to exile from their home. Josephus gives a far higher figure of 1.1 million dead over the course of the siege, among them Passover pilgrims trapped in the city when the siege closed. While rejecting these figures as exaggerated, historian Menahem Stern writes that Josephus's mention of 23,400 armed men in Jerusalem on the eve of the siege is realistic. The city was also crowded with refugees from Judea, Galilee, and Idumaea. The rival factions ended their internal conflict and united when the Romans began attacking Jerusalem's walls.

Titus led a reconnaissance force of about 600 cavalry to assess Jerusalem's northern defenses, narrowly escaping an ambush after being cut off from the main body of his troops. He then advanced to Mount Scopus, northeast of the city, where he established camps for Legio XII, XV, and V. Legio X Fretensis camped separately on the Mount of Olives. Its soldiers were still building their fortifications, many of them unarmed, when a combined force from the rival factions crossed the Kidron Valley and surprised them. The assault was repelled only after Titus intervened in person. John of Gischala and Simon bar Giora reconciled, though their factions continued to operate under separate command, maintaining their division of the city.

== Battle for Jerusalem's walls ==
On 14 Nisan, the start of the Passover festival, the Romans took advantage of a temporary halt in Jewish attacks to move their siege forces closer to Jerusalem's walls. That same night, John of Gischala's men took advantage of the opening of the Temple's inner gates for festival worshippers: entering among the crowd with weapons concealed, they overpowered the Zealots stationed in the courts and seized the sanctuary. Some of the defeated Zealots fled to underground hiding places beneath the Temple Mount, while others joined John's faction; Eleazar ben Simon retained a command role under John's leadership. Roman historian Cassius Dio, writing in Greek more than a century later, stated that Titus had offered the Jews terms of surrender before the siege began, but they rejected his offer.

The Romans opened their assault against the Third Wall. Internal fighting briefly resumed, with Simon bar Giora's forces engaged on two fronts, against John inside the Temple complex and against the Romans as their siegeworks advanced, though the two factions appear to have reached a truce shortly afterward. Once the Romans completed their siegeworks, Jewish forces launched an offensive that initially gained ground before being repelled by Roman cavalry. During or shortly after this engagement, the Idumaean commander John ben Sosas was killed by an arrow; Titus had a Jewish captive crucified within sight of the walls to intimidate the defenders, a tactic he would use repeatedly during the siege.

Fifteen days into the siege works, a Roman battering ram breached the Third Wall after repeated Jewish attempts to set fire to the engines. Within five days, the Romans broke through the middle section of the Second Wall. The breach was too narrow, and Roman troops pushing through it were caught in the lanes beyond, where defenders who knew the ground inflicted heavy losses and drove them back. Four days later, the Romans returned, widened the breach, and captured the area. They then levelled the northern quarter and halted operations for several days, during which desertions to the Roman lines increased.

== From Antonia to the Temple Mount ==
When hostilities resumed, Titus constructed siege ramps at the Antonia Fortress and against the towers of the Upper City, while also employing psychological warfare. He staged a four-day parade of cavalry and infantry in polished armor and distributed their pay in view of the walls. He again offered peace terms through Josephus, who addressed the population in their "ancestral tongue"—likely Hebrew, though possibly Aramaic. Josephus argued that the Romans had respected Jewish holy sites, unlike the rebels who had endangered them, and urged repentance, claiming that Rome's victories showed that God now favored Roman rule. Josephus says he was struck by a stone from the wall; he responded by recounting Jewish history from the Exodus to the return from Babylonian exile, arguing that past victories had come through obedience to divine will rather than armed resistance. Comparing himself to the prophet Jeremiah, he warned that the true struggle was not against Rome but against God, and again urged the defenders to surrender in order to spare the city, the Temple, and their families. The rebels refused—whether out of trust in divine protection, confidence in their fortifications, or fear of the humiliation and torture that awaited them if captured.

Within the city, the rebel factions attacked those trying to flee and ransacked wealthy homes for food, torturing householders suspected of hoarding. Outside the walls, Roman soldiers tortured and crucified captured Jews in sight of the defenders, nailing them to crosses in different positions as a form of mockery. Josephus states that about 500 were captured each day, sometimes more, and that Titus did not prevent the executions, hoping the spectacle would encourage surrender. Syrian and Arab auxiliaries reportedly disemboweled refugees in search of swallowed valuables.

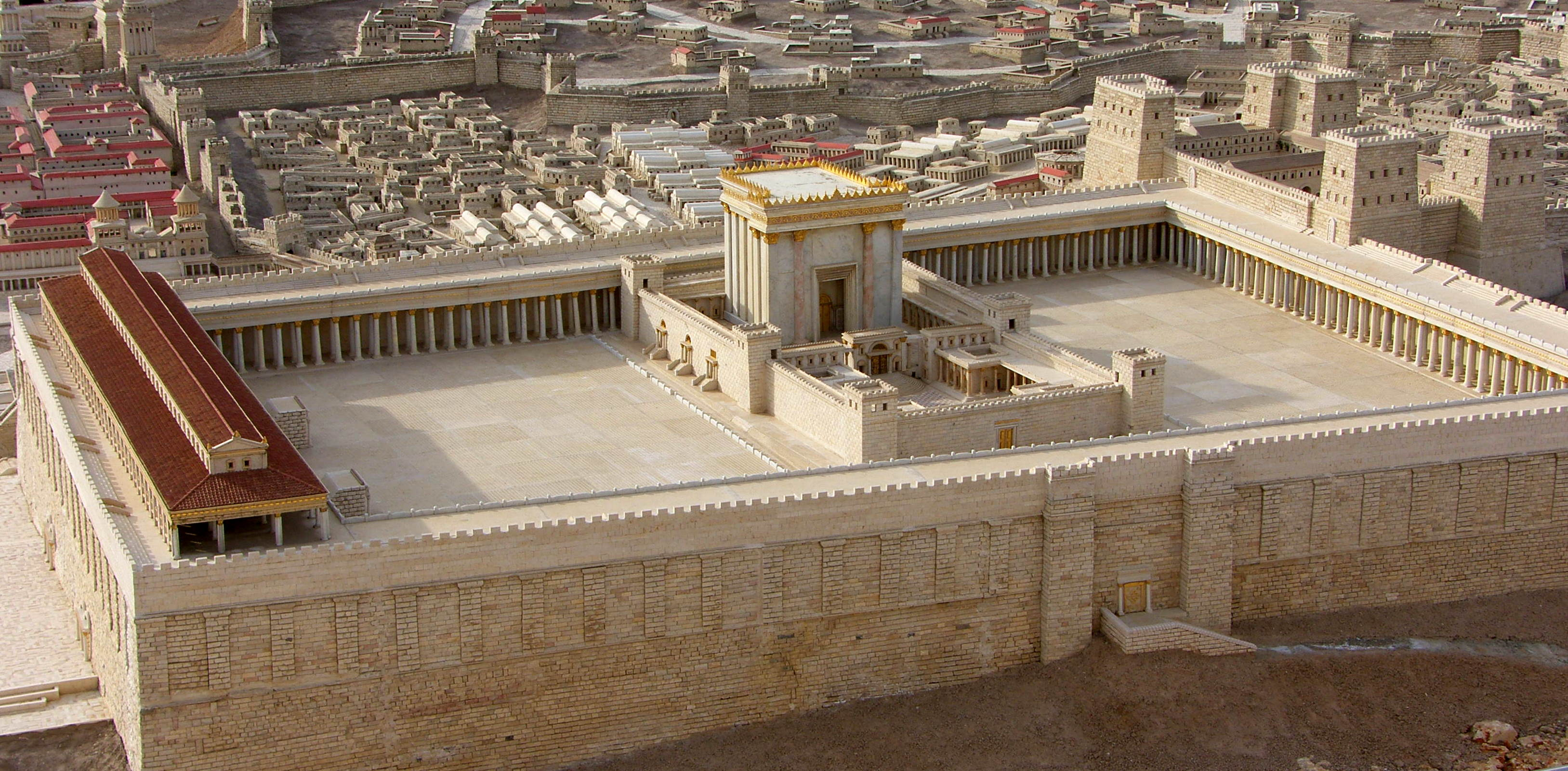
Scale model reconstruction of the Second Temple complex and the Antonia Fortress (upper right), part of the Holyland Model of Jerusalem at the Israel Museum

As grain prices soared, residents scavenged for scraps in the sewers. Meanwhile, large numbers of corpses accumulated outside the city. Many starved; others died of diseases brought on by hunger. Josephus describes children with swollen bellies and deserters showing signs of what appears to have been dropsy. The later exegesis Lamentations Rabbah preserves a tradition in which rabbi Eleazar bar Zadok recalls that his father's body never fully recovered from the famine, even decades later; the same source describes a woman whose hair fell out from malnutrition.

The legions began raising four ramps against the Antonia Fortress on 12 Iyar (April/May) and completed them seventeen days later. John of Gischala countered by tunneling beneath the works, shoring the mine with timber and setting it alight; the props burned through and the ramps collapsed into the cavity. Two days later, Simon bar Giora's men destroyed the engines in the western sector. The Romans rebuilt their machines and, according to Josephus, completed a circumvallation wall some 39 stadia (4.5 miles or 7.2 kilometers) long, with thirteen forts, in just three days, cutting off supply lines and escape routes. Titus then ordered fresh ramps raised against Antonia. The Romans stormed the outworks on 1 Tammuz (June/July), and that night the wall gave way at the very point John had mined; the fortress fell shortly afterwards.

Inside the city, Simon bar Giora executed members of the elite and suspected advocates of surrender, throwing their mutilated bodies beyond the walls. Some residents tried to escape by jumping from the walls; others went out as if to skirmish and then deserted to the Romans. John and his followers reportedly plundered the Temple, melting down sacred vessels, consuming consecrated food, and distributing sacred oil and wine among their supporters. The famine grew more severe, claiming many lives. Josephus recounts the story of a woman named Maria from Perea, a region in Transjordan. After rebels plundered her possessions, she killed, roasted, and ate her infant son. When rebel fighters later came searching for food, drawn by the smell of cooking, she offered them what remained of the child; horrified, they fled the house.

The fighting carried on into the Temple complex, where the Romans gained ground before being pushed back after some ten hours. A centurion named Iulianus temporarily drove the Jewish defenders back into the complex single-handedly before slipping, being surrounded, and killed. Titus ordered the foundations of the Antonia to be dug out to open a route for his army. According to Josephus, on 17 Tammuz, the daily temple sacrifice (Tamid) ceased for lack of priests or lambs. (Note: The Mishnah, Ta'anit 4:6 independently lists the cessation of the tamid on 17 Tammuz among the calamities of that date.) Titus again offered peace through Josephus, who addressed the defenders "in the language of the Hebrews", but they refused. Josephus also conveyed Titus's offer to let John resume the sacrifices with any Jews he wished to appoint, but John refused, declaring that he had no fear of the city's capture because it belonged to God. Whether or not the exchange occurred as described, it reflects a belief, dating back to the Kingdom of Judah, that Zion enjoyed divine protection.

Some priests and members of the nobility surrendered and were sent by Titus to Gophna. Titus later recalled them and had them walk around the city walls with Josephus to encourage further defections; many more residents then fled to the Romans. The Romans then built four ramps aimed at the Temple's defenses. The defenders set fire to the northwest stoa (portico) connecting the Temple to the Antonia Fortress to block Roman access, while the Romans burned the adjoining portico two days later, on 24 Tammuz. After repeated failed attempts to breach the Temple walls with battering rams, the Romans set fire to its gates and porticoes, forcing the defenders back into the inner court. Josephus reports that Titus then convened his commanders to debate the Temple's fate; and that Titus personally opposed those urging its destruction, arguing that so magnificent a structure should be preserved as an ornament of Roman rule.

== Destruction of the Second Temple ==
According to Josephus, on 8 Av (July/August), two legions completed their ramps against the Temple. When the battering rams failed to breach the masonry, Titus ordered the gates set alight; the fire spread through the porticoes, and the outer court fell into Roman hands. Two days later, on 10 Av, a Roman soldier hurled a burning piece of wood through a window on the Temple's north side, igniting a fire that ultimately consumed the structure. (Note: Josephus dates the burning to the tenth of Av and observes that the First Temple had been destroyed on the same day (War, 6.250). Rabbinic tradition instead places both destructions on the ninth (Mishnah, Ta'anit 4:6), the date observed as Tisha B'Av. The Talmud (Ta'anit 29a) already registers the difficulty, noting that 2 Kings 25:8 gives the seventh of the month and Jeremiah 52:12 the tenth, and reconciles them by holding that the fire was set late on the ninth and consumed the building on the tenth.) Josephus writes that Titus, roused from rest, rushed to the scene and ordered the fire extinguished, but that some soldiers either failed to hear or disregarded his orders, with some urging others to spread the flames. Titus and his commanders then entered the Temple, where he again ordered the soldiers to extinguish the fire, but many continued their actions, motivated by their hatred of Jews and hope of plunder.

As the Temple burned, Roman soldiers killed everyone they encountered, whether they resisted or pleaded for their lives. Soldiers climbed over piles of corpses as they pursued those attempting to flee. (Note: Josephus writes that the flames, battle cries, and screams combined into a deafening sound that could be heard as far as Perea.) The priests reportedly continued performing their ritual duties until they were killed, with many accepting death willingly. Josephus recounts that two priests, Meirus son of Belgas and Joseph son of Daleus, threw themselves into the flames and died alongside the Temple. Cassius Dio writes that "the Jews defended themselves much more vigorously than before", treating the chance to fight and die beside the temple as a stroke of "rare good fortune"; they soon "met death willingly, some throwing themselves on the swords of the Romans, some slaying one another, others taking their own lives, and still others leaping into the flames". Avot de-Rabbi Natan similarly relates that young priests, seeing the sanctuary ablaze, cast the Temple keys toward heaven, declaring themselves unworthy custodians before leaping together into the fire.

Roman soldiers looted and killed indiscriminately, sparing no one, including those who begged for their lives. According to Josephus, some 6,000 people, many of them poor women and children, had taken refuge in a colonnade in the outer court; the Romans set it ablaze, killing everyone inside. Josephus blames the deaths on "false prophets" who had urged the crowd to gather on the Temple Mount, promising that doing so would bring deliverance.

The Romans then systematically destroyed what remained of the Temple Mount, razing its porticoes, treasuries, and gates. Soldiers carried their military standards into the Temple court and offered sacrifices before them, then hailed Titus as imperator. The soldiers took so much plunder that, according to Josephus, that the price of gold in Syria fell by half. A group of priests attempted to surrender, but Titus had them executed, declaring it fitting that they die alongside the Temple. With the destruction of the Temple complex complete, Roman forces turned to demolishing the rest of the city.

=== Responsibility for the destruction ===
Whether the destruction was intentional, and how much responsibility rests with Titus personally, remains a matter of scholarly dispute. Sulpicius Severus, a Christian historian writing in 4th-century Gaul, offers a different account. Possibly drawing on Tacitus's lost narrative in the Histories, (Note: First proposed by Jacob Bernays in the mid-nineteenth century, this theory remains disputed. Another interpretation suggests that Sulpicius's account was derived from Josephus but was reworked for theological purposes, portraying the temple's destruction as divine punishment of the Jewish people.) he states that Titus deliberately ordered the Temple's destruction in order to abolish Judaism and Christianity. The Babylonian Talmud likewise portrays Titus as directly responsible for the destruction.

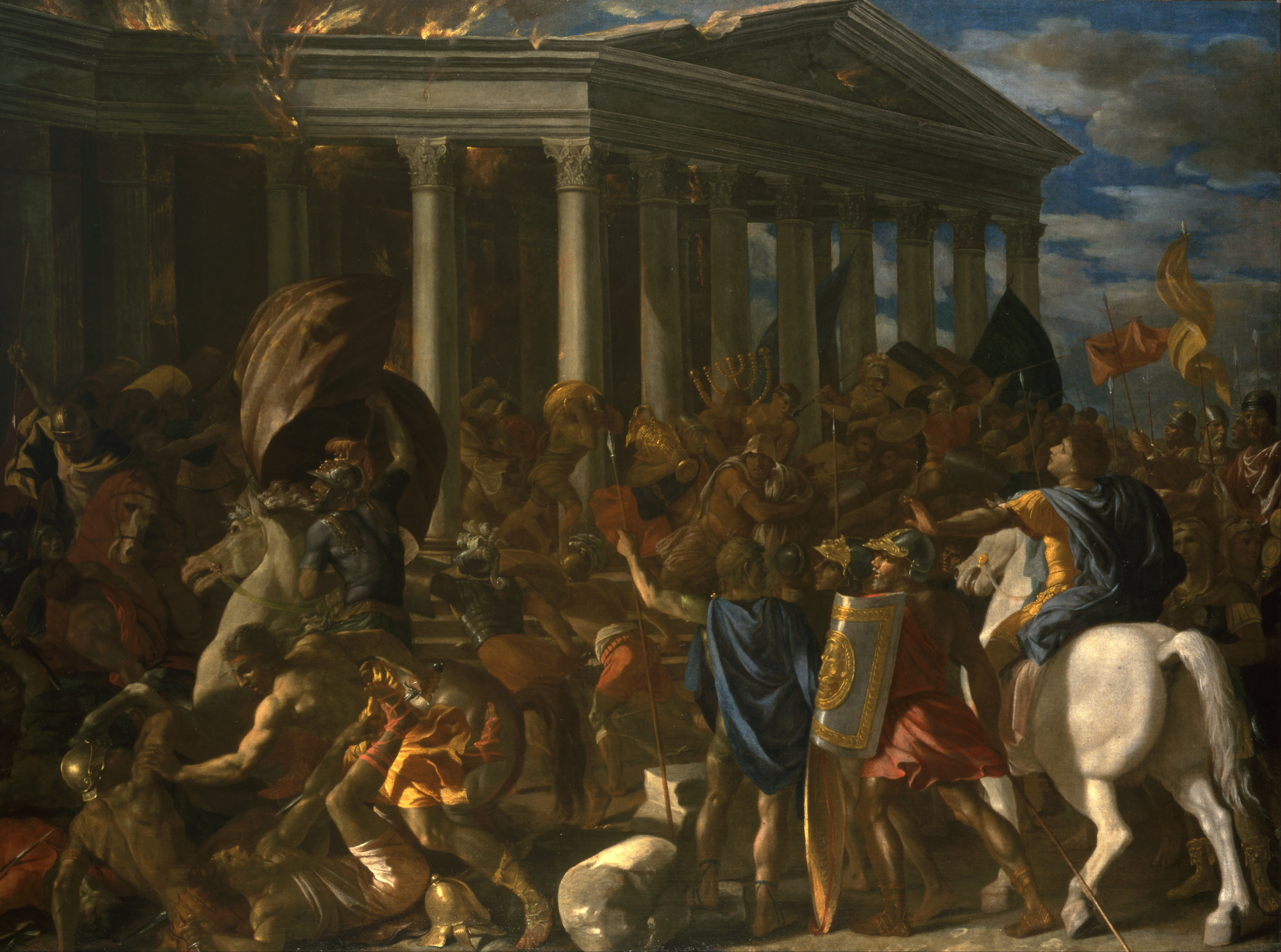
The Destruction and Sack of the Temple of Jerusalem, 17th-century painting by Nicolas Poussin

Given Jerusalem's dry summer heat, historian Martin Goodman considers Josephus's account—that a single burning piece of wood rapidly set the building alight—to be plausible. Most modern scholars, however, reject Josephus's version. Lester L. Grabbe calls it "unbelievable", arguing that a Roman commander known for harsh discipline, including the use of the death penalty, would not have tolerated his soldiers openly disobeying orders in his presence. Since the destruction of temples was regarded in antiquity as an act of sacrilege, (Note: According to Benjamin Isaac, the destruction of sanctuaries has been a common wartime practice dating back to at least the fifth century BCE.) some scholars suggest that Josephus may have downplayed Titus's role in order to protect Titus's reputation. Grabbe and Fausto Parente argue instead that Josephus's version was meant to discourage Jews from seeking future vengeance for the Temple's destruction.

Several modern historians view the destruction as deliberate and ideologically motivated. Doron Mendels argues that the Romans targeted the Temple because they regarded it, and Jerusalem more broadly, as the center of Jewish rebellion. James Rives maintains that the goal was "not only to forestall future revolts but also to eliminate the anomalous cultic organization that hindered the integration of Jews into the empire". Steve Mason argues that Titus and the Flavian regime treated the Temple's destruction not as an embarrassment but as a military necessity, noting that Rome had previously destroyed temples at Carthage and Corinth, and that nothing in the historical record suggests Titus regarded the act as shameful. He also points to the Argonautica of the Roman poet Valerius Flaccus, which celebrates Titus as "begrimed with the dust of Jerusalem", hurling firebrands and raging on every turret, as evidence that the destruction was not presented as a source of shame.

According to Doron Lopez, the Temple's destruction was a characteristic, perhaps even inadvertent, consequence of capturing an enemy city, common in Roman conquests generally. He notes that despite Rome's pious self-image, dozens of cases show piety being set aside amid the thirst for plunder or destruction. Lopez rejects the idea that the destruction targeted Judaism specifically, pointing to its absence from Flavian propaganda, and argues this interpretation instead reflects a Jewish perspective on the event.

== Conquest of the Lower and Upper City ==
After the Temple's destruction, some rebels sought a parley with Titus, meeting on a bridge overlooking the ruins, possibly at what is now Wilson's Arch. Hoping to save what remained of the city, they were met instead with a rebuke: Titus, speaking through an interpreter (possibly Josephus), condemned them for their repeated ingratitude and rejection of peace terms dating back to Pompey's time. He offered them one final chance to surrender, but the rebels demanded safe passage to the desert for themselves and their families. Offended by the demand, Titus broke off negotiations and declared that he would offer no further terms.

The following day, Titus authorized the burning and sacking of what remained of the city. Roman soldiers set fire to the city archives, the Acra fortress, the council chamber, and the Ophel district, and the blaze spread through the Lower City, eventually reaching Helena of Adiabene's palace and the Pool of Siloam. Titus granted protection to the family of King Izates of Adiabene, who were subsequently taken to Rome as hostages. The Romans found little plunder in the captured areas, as the rebels had already stripped them of anything valuable. The rebels then retreated to Herod's Palace, massacred those inside, and looted its contents. They captured two Roman soldiers and killed one; the second escaped before he could be executed, and Titus discharged him in disgrace. The rebels mocked Josephus's renewed appeals and withdrew into the tunnels beneath the city, hoarding food and killing anyone who came upon them.

Jerusalem's Upper City was the last district to fall. On 20 Av, the Romans launched a fresh assault, constructing siege ramps to the northwest and northeast. Five Idumaean leaders secretly approached Titus to negotiate surrender, and he agreed, hoping their capitulation would encourage others to follow. Simon bar Giora, however, discovered the plot, executed the five envoys, and imprisoned the remaining leaders. Despite this, many Idumaeans still defected to the Romans; those who held Roman citizenship were released, while the rest were sold into slavery. A priest named Jesus son of Thebuthi surrendered a number of sacred items from the sanctuary, including two lampstands, golden tables, garments, and precious stones, while another priest, Phineas, secured a pardon by handing over priestly vestments and the spices used in ritual offerings. These objects were later paraded in Rome during Titus's triumph.

Within eighteen days, the Romans completed their siege works and, on 7 Elul (August/September), launched their final assault. Once the Upper City's wall was breached, resistance collapsed quickly. The defenders abandoned the towers of Herod's citadel, which Josephus considered impregnable to anything but starvation. Their last counterattack repelled, the rebel leaders fled into the city's underground tunnels. Roman forces raised their standards over the captured towers and carried out a massacre, cutting down civilians in the streets and in their homes; some families were found already dead of starvation, while others were killed outright. The killing ceased only with nightfall. By morning, Jerusalem was entirely engulfed in flames.

== Destruction of Jerusalem ==
By early September, the conquest of Jerusalem was complete. According to Josephus, Titus ordered the city razed, except for a few structures:

The army now having no victims either for Jerusalem slaughter or plunder, through lack of all objects on which to vent their rage—for they would assuredly never have desisted through a desire to spare anything so long as there was work to be done—Caesar ordered the whole city and the temple to be razed to the ground, leaving only the loftiest of the towers, Phasael, Hippicus, and Mariamme, (Note: One of these towers still stands within the Tower of David complex. Most scholars identify it as Phasael, though Hillel Geva has argued that it should instead be identified as Hippicus.) and the portion of the wall enclosing the city on the west: the latter as an encampment for the garrison that was to remain, and the towers to indicate to posterity the nature of the city and of the strong defences which had yet yielded to Roman prowess. All the rest of the wall encompassing the city was so completely levelled to the ground as to leave future visitors to the spot no ground for believing that it had ever been inhabited. Such was the end to which the frenzy of revolutionaries brought Jerusalem, that splendid city of world-wide renown.

— Josephus, The Jewish War', VII, 1.1 (Translated by Henry St. John Thackeray)

Archaeological remains of destruction have been found across the ancient city, corroborating Josephus's account. Excavations along the southwestern foot of the Temple Mount—directed by Benjamin Mazar and Meir Ben-Dov in 1968–1978 and renewed by Ronny Reich and Ya'akov Billig in 1994–1998—uncovered massive piles of stones from the Western Wall, fallen onto the paved street below. The wall's upper courses appear to have been dismantled course by course. (Note: Shimon Gibson has proposed that the massive stone collapse resulted from the earthquake of 363 CE. Reich and Baruch reject this interpretation, citing, among other evidence, the absence of coins dated later than 69 CE beneath the collapse, indications that the wall's upper courses were systematically dismantled rather than brought down in a single seismic event, and the reuse of stones as early as 79 CE.) Among the rubble are stones from Robinson's Arch, a monumental staircase leading up to the Temple precinct, including remains of its parapets. One of the arch's fallen parapet stones was later reused as a Roman milestone bearing an inscription naming Vespasian and Titus; because Titus is styled imperator, Reich dates the inscription to his reign (79–81), indicating that the arch had already been destroyed by then. Also found among the rubble were broken pilasters, some bearing signs of burning. Near the southern end of the Western Wall, excavators recovered the Trumpeting Place inscription, a stone marking the spot where a priest would sound a trumpet to announce the beginning and end of Shabbat. (Note: The inscription's placement corresponds to a station described by Josephus, who notes that Jewish rebels built a tower above this same spot to gain height for hurling missiles at the Roman legionaries below.)

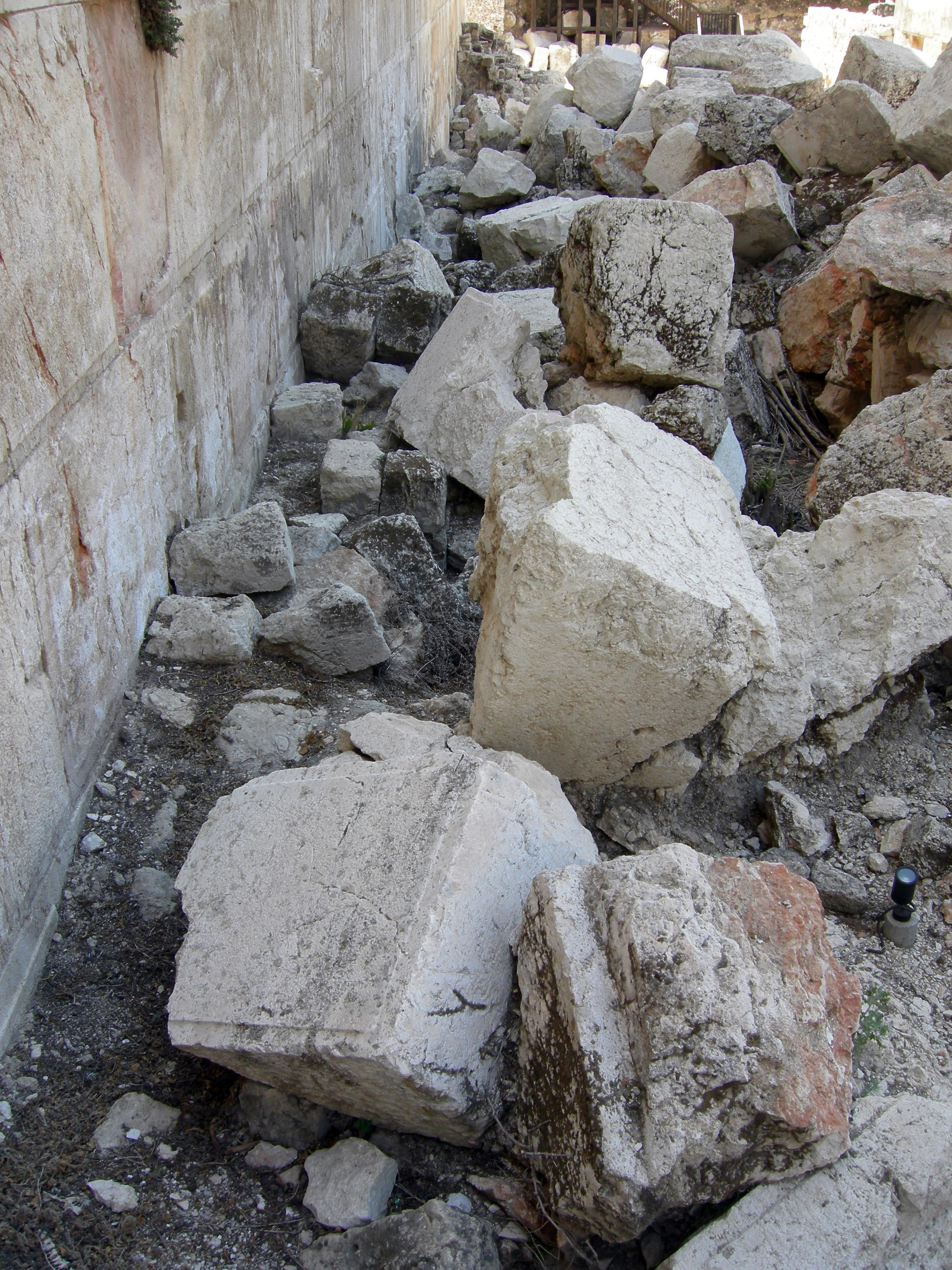
Stones from the Temple Mount complex lying on the street below at the Western Wall

Mazar's excavations also recovered hundreds of architectural fragments below the southern wall, later studied by Orit Peleg-Barkat. In consultation with geologist Aryeh Shimron, she attributed many of them on stylistic grounds to the Royal Stoa, a basilica that stood at the complex's southern end. Shimron's analysis found white crusts and gray discoloration on the stones consistent with soot absorption and conversion to calcium oxide, indicating sustained burning above 800°C. One limestone rosette also preserved a veneer of bone dust fused into its surface through vitrification, though whether the bone was human or animal could not be determined.

Evidence for widespread burning and destruction was also uncovered in the Jewish Quarter of the Old City, on the site of the ancient Upper City district. Excavations there were conducted under the direction of archaeologist Nahman Avigad from 1969 to 1982. They uncovered evidence of a massive fire and structural collapse, including deposits of ash and building debris up to 2 metres (6.6 ft) deep in some areas. The prolonged heat also caused the limestone walls to calcine into calcium oxide. The fire's effects were also visible on household objects: Limestone vessels were stained with ash or calcined into lime, while glass vessels shattered or warped in the heat. Among the glass finds was a piece made by the renowned first-century glassmaker Ennion, recovered from an Upper City mansion. The destruction also brought down wooden cellings and upper floors, burying the contents of the buildings beneath the collapse. Another structure uncovered in the Upper City is the Burnt House. Excavations there revealed thick layers of ash covering the basement, along with kitchen tools, pottery, and a stone weight inscribed with the name of the priestly Kathros family, suggesting the building may have formed part of the basement of the family villa. Among the finds were a spear and the skeletal forearm of a young woman who was probably killed during the siege.

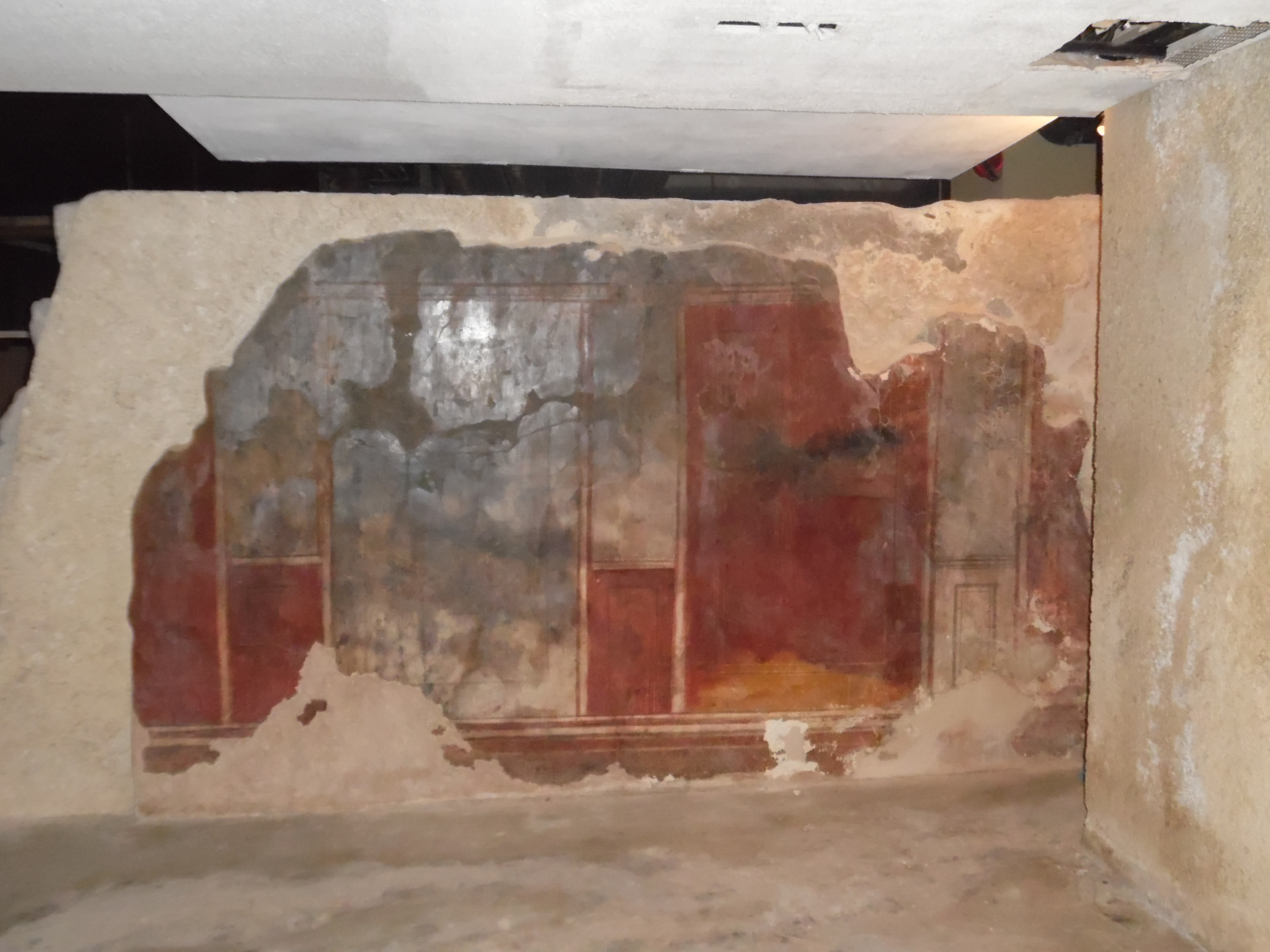
A fresco showing signs of burning, Wohl Archaeological Museum, Jewish Quarter

A large, elaborately constructed building uncovered in the Givati Lot in the City of David, (Note: Excavations at the site began in 2007.) near the southern edge of the Temple Mount, has been tentatively identified by Doron Ben-Ami and Yana Tchekhanovets as one of the Adiabene royal family's palaces in the Lower City. Its occupants had cut narrow, concealable openings into the basement walls, apparently in an attempt to escape shortly before the building's destruction. The structure appears to have been deliberately demolished, with collapsed walls crushing the basement vaults below. Pottery and coins recovered from the debris date the destruction to 70 CE.

Josephus's account of Jerusalem's residents attempting to escape through underground passages after the city's fall aligns with a drainage channel discovered beneath the stepped street in the Tyropoeon Valley. Excavations revealed the channel was large enough for a person to crawl through and contained intact cooking pots and coins from the revolt. The great urban drainage channel and the Pool of Siloam in the Lower City silted up and fell out of use. Nearby, Ronny Reich and Eli Shukron uncovered a paved esplanade buried beneath collapsed building stones and debris that had apparently fallen from the City of David hill above. Additionally, city walls collapsed in numerous places.

== Captives and executions ==
After Jerusalem's fall, Titus ordered the killing of those who continued to resist, though many elderly and infirm prisoners were massacred as well, despite his orders to the contrary. Survivors in good condition were detained in the Court of the Women, one of the temple's courtyards, where the Roman official Fronto determined their fate. Rebels and brigands were executed, while the tallest and most handsome were selected for Titus's triumph in Rome. Prisoners over 17 were sent in chains to Egypt or distributed across the empire for execution by the sword or wild animals, and those under 17 were sold into slavery.

Around 11,000 prisoners reportedly died of starvation, either from neglect or refusing food. Josephus claims to have rescued his brother and friends, and even intervened to save three men being crucified in Teqoa—though only one survived. Eusebius, a 4th-century bishop and historian, writes that Vespasian ordered the eradication of all members of the Davidic line, to prevent any potential Jewish royal resurgence.

Once most of Jerusalem's remaining population had been killed or enslaved, the Romans turned to searching the city's underground tunnels for survivors. In several places, paving stones above the tunnels had been deliberately removed and broken, apparently by Roman soldiers searching for people who had taken refuge below. According to Josephus, many of those found were executed on the spot, while more than 2,000 were discovered already dead, having died from starvation or killed one another. Soldiers also recovered valuables and prisoners the rebels had been holding. John of Gischala was captured after emerging from the tunnels and was sentenced to life imprisonment.

Simon bar Giora was caught after he and his companions, hiding in an underground passage, ran short of food. He surfaced at the site of the destroyed Temple dressed in a white tunic and a purple mantle—a choice of clothing possibly meant to assert a royal claim. The Roman officer Terentius Rufus had him seized and sent to Titus at Caesarea Maritima. Both John and Simon were later transported to Rome to be displayed in the triumph.

Following the conquest, Titus embarked on a regional victory tour. At Caesarea Philippi, he staged games featuring Jewish prisoners, including executions by wild animals and gladiatorial combat. At Caesarea Maritima, some 2,500 captives were killed in similar spectacles to mark his brother's birthday, and further prisoners died during games held in Berytus in honor of Vespasian's birthday.

== Aftermath ==
=== Casualties, enslavement, and displacement ===
During the siege of Jerusalem and its aftermath, the population suffered mass extermination. Josephus claims that 1.1 million people died in the siege, mostly Jews who came for Passover and became trapped in the city as pilgrims kept arriving despite the revolt. He also records several waves of desertions before and during the siege. Modern scholars generally regard his death toll as greatly exaggerated. Historian Seth Schwartz, for instance, estimates that Roman Palestine's total population at the time was around one million, with roughly half being Jewish. He notes that sizable Jewish communities remained in the region after the war, even in Judea, despite its devastation. (Note: Schwartz, however, believes that the captive number of 97,000 reported by Josephus is more reliable.) Guy Rogers estimates the death toll at tens of thousands, likely 20,000–30,000. Genocide scholar Shawn J. Kelley has characterized the event as a genocide. Gil Gambash, however, argued that since the Romans did not attempt to destroy the Jews as an ethnos or genos, but rather directed destruction at communities that resisted them, "urbicide" may be a more appropriate framework.

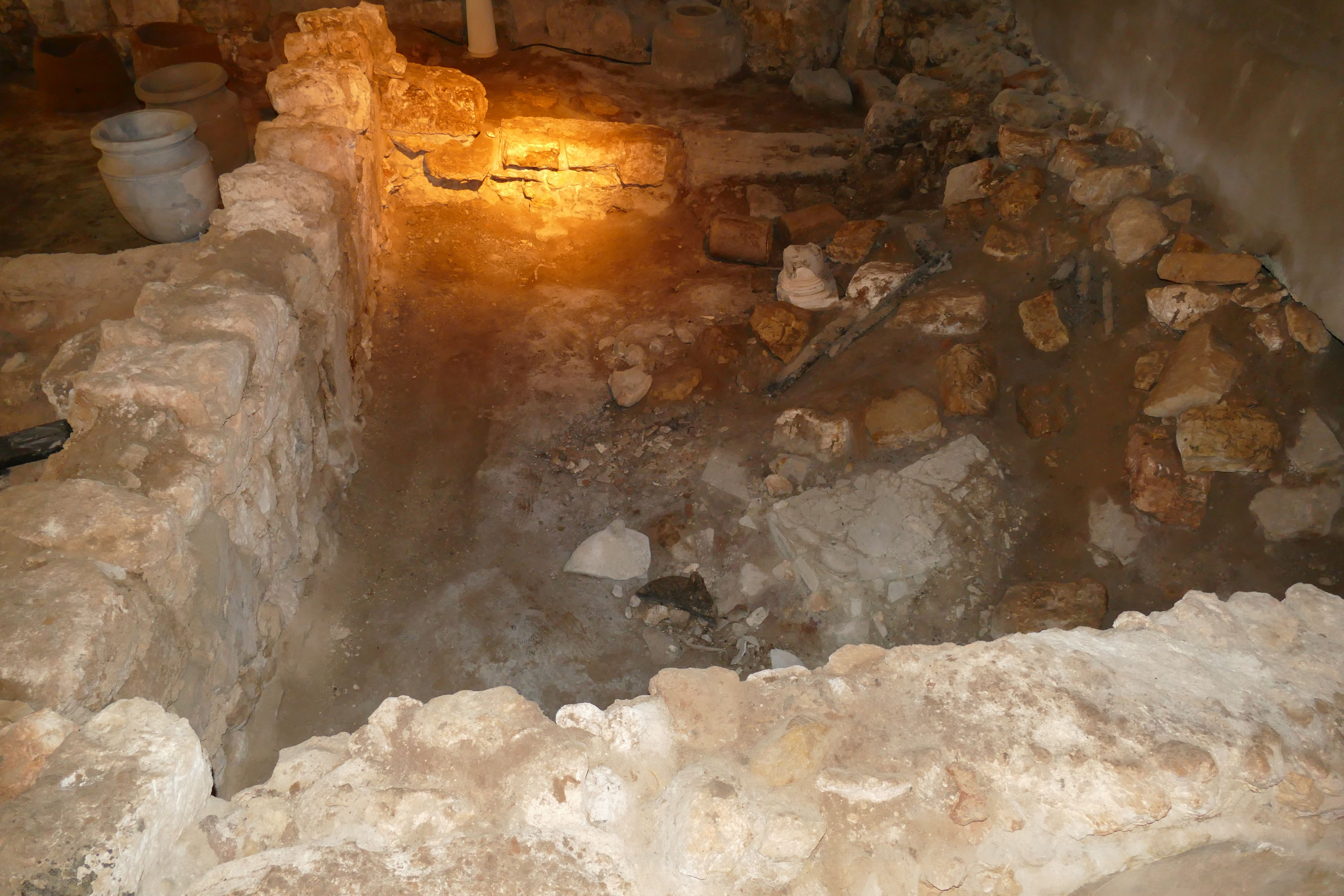
Layers of ash and collapsed building materials in the basement of a priestly mansion, known today as the Burnt House

Many in the surrounding region were also killed, displaced, or enslaved. Josephus reports that after the Romans put the armed men and elderly to death, others were sold into slavery (Josephus gives a total of 97,000 captives taken throughout the war), while 40,000 survivors from Jerusalem were released by the emperor. Traces of this enslaved population surface in Italy: a tombstone from Puteoli, near Naples, commemorates a woman named Claudia Aster, identified as a captive from Jerusalem, whose name may derive from Esther. Roman poet Martial likewise mentions a Jewish slave in his own household who came from "Jerusalem destroyed by fire."

=== Triumph and mop-up operations ===
in the summer of 71, about a year after Jerusalem's fall, Titus and Vespasian held a triumph in Rome celebrating their victory in Judaea. This triumph was unique in Roman history as the only one dedicated to subjugating the population of an existing province. It is also the best-documented triumph of the imperial era, described in vivid detail by Josephus in Book 7 of The Jewish War.

At dawn, Vespasian and Titus, wearing laurel crowns and ceremonial attire, left the Temple of Isis for the Porticus Octaviae, where they met Rome's leading officials. Seated on an ivory tribunal, they offered prayers of thanksgiving before proceeding to the Porta Triumphalis, where they performed sacrifices, donned purple triumphal robes, and began the procession. The event attracted an enormous crowd, estimated by archaeologist Ernst Künzl at over 300,000 spectators. The procession included 700 Jewish captives, who were paraded "to make a display of their own destruction", along with sacred items from the Temple, such as the menorah, the golden Table of Showbread, and the scrolls of the Law. Vespasian and Titus rode in triumphal chariots, while Domitian, Titus's younger brother, accompanied them on horseback. Artworks, rugs, gems, statues of the gods, and garlanded animals were carried past on multi-storey floats framed in gold and ivory and hung with tapestries showing scenes from the war. The triumph culminated on the Capitoline Hill with the execution of Simon bar Giora at the Mamertine Prison, in accordance with Roman custom.

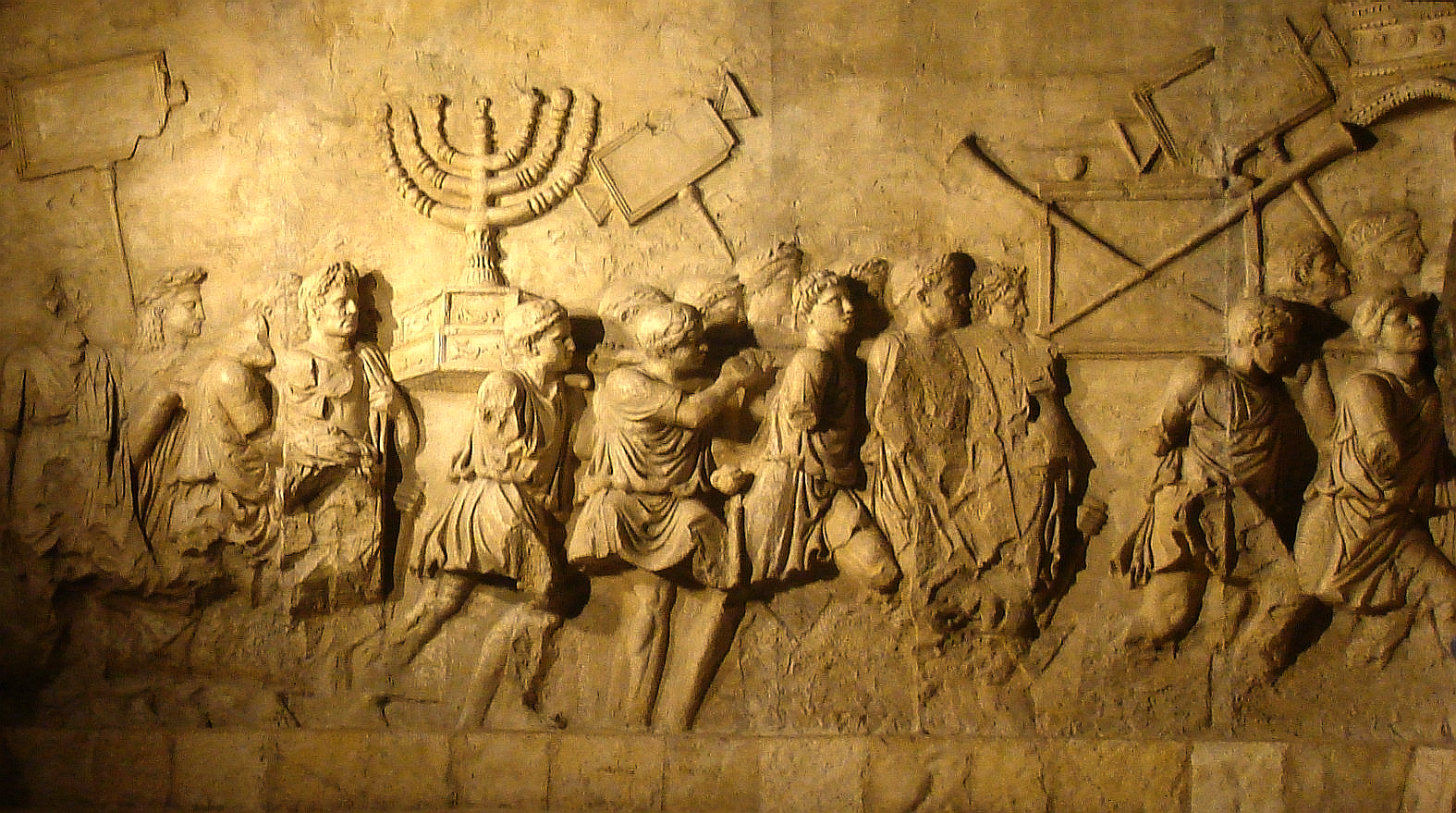
In 71, a triumph was held in Rome to celebrate Titus's victory. It is commemorated on the Arch of Titus, which depicts Roman soldiers carrying spoils from the Temple, including the menorah

After Jerusalem's fall, most of Judaea was finally subdued, with the exception of three strongholds—Herodium, Machaerus, and Masada—which remained under rebel control. Roman legates were assigned to eliminate these final pockets of resistance. Herodium and Machaerus fell within two years, leaving Masada as the last stronghold. In 73/74, the Romans breached its walls after a prolonged siege, ending the Jewish revolt.

=== Legio X Fretensis garrisons the ruins of Jerusalem ===
After Jerusalem's fall, Legio X Fretensis, garrisoned the ruins for nearly two centuries. Its presence is confirmed by inscriptions, tiles, and bricks bearing the legion's stamp, though the camp's exact location remains uncertain. (Note: It is widely accepted among scholars, however, that it stood on the southwestern hill.) The establishment of a Roman garrison likely discouraged Jews from returning. Josephus wrote that Titus granted him land elsewhere because his holdings in Jerusalem were unprofitable with the garrison quartered there. He also stated that the Romans cut down all the trees in the vicinity of the city as they constructed their siege works. The once tree-covered and garden-filled countryside became so desolate that those who had known it before would no longer have recognized it.

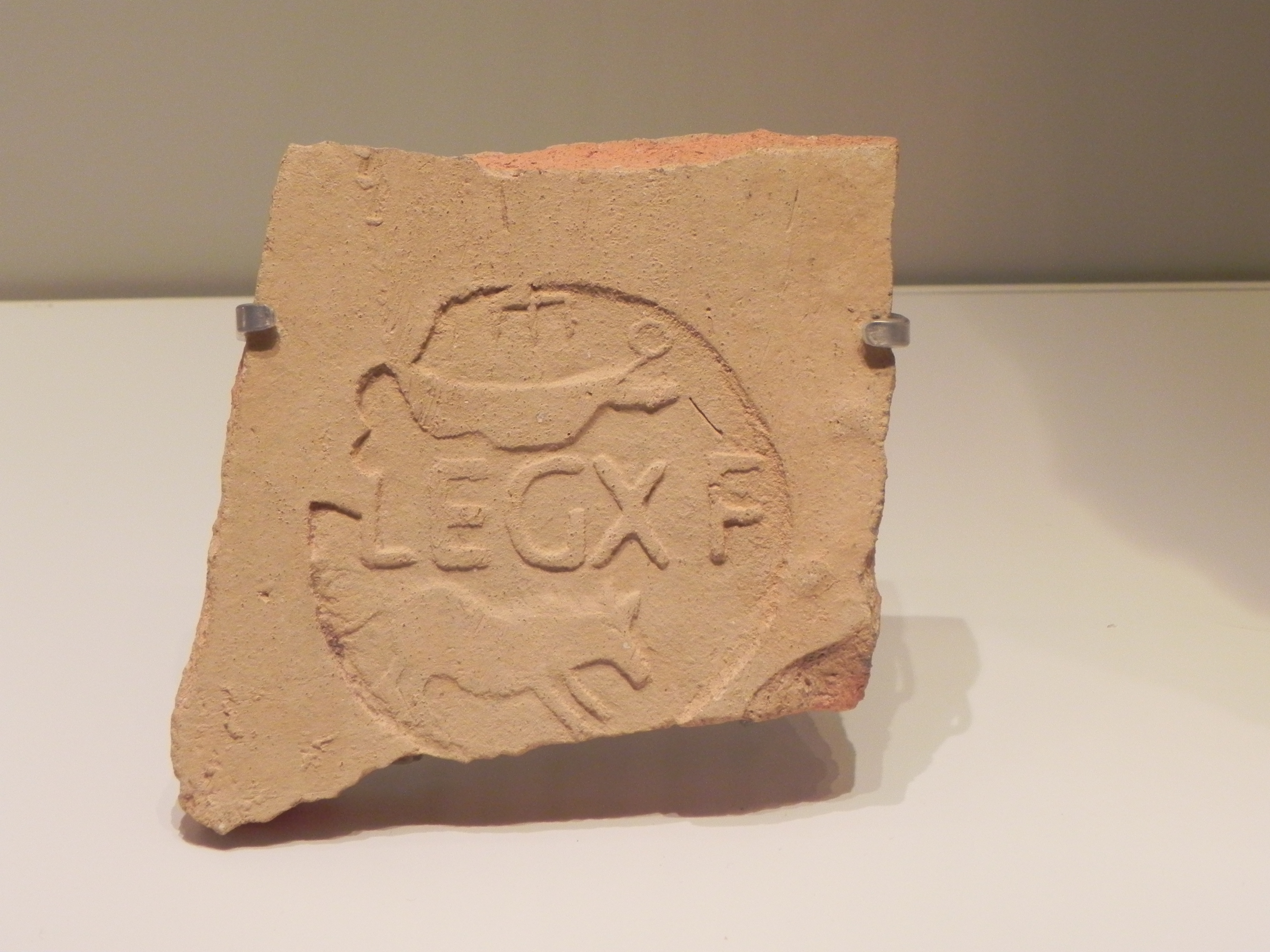
A roof tile stamped with the mark of Legio X Fretensis, found near Jerusalem's International Convention Center

A small number of people may have remained after the city's destruction. Josephus has Eleazar ben Yair speak of "hapless old men sit[ting] beside the ashes of the shrine, and a few women, reserved by the enemy for basest outrage". Epiphanius, a 4th-century Christian bishop, records what may be authentic testimony of a small, impoverished Jewish community residing on Jerusalem's southwestern hill between the revolts. Excavations at Shuafat, 4 kilometres (2.5 mi) north of the Old City, uncovered a post-destruction settlement built in Roman style but inhabited by Jews. It was partially burned and abandoned several decades later, at the start of the Bar Kokhba Revolt.

=== Commemoration in Rome ===
To celebrate their triumph, the Flavians initiated a series of grand construction projects in Rome. In 75, Vespasian completed the Temple of Peace—a monumental complex dedicated to Pax, the goddess of peace, adjacent to the Forum of Augustus. The temple housed the menorah, the Table of Showbread, and other ritual objects from Jerusalem, along with a large collection of artworks. Another landmark associated with the triumph was the Colosseum, completed under Titus and financed, according to an inscription, "from the spoils of war"—a reference to the war in Judaea.

The Flavians also launched a coinage campaign known as Judaea capta ("Judaea has been conquered"). Issued over a span of 10 to 12 years, these coins became a central tool of Flavian propaganda. The obverse featured Vespasian or Titus, while the reverse depicted a mourning female figure, symbolizing the subjugated Jewish people, seated beneath a palm tree, the emblem of Judaea. In some variations, the figure appears bound or kneeling before the victory goddess Nike (Victoria).

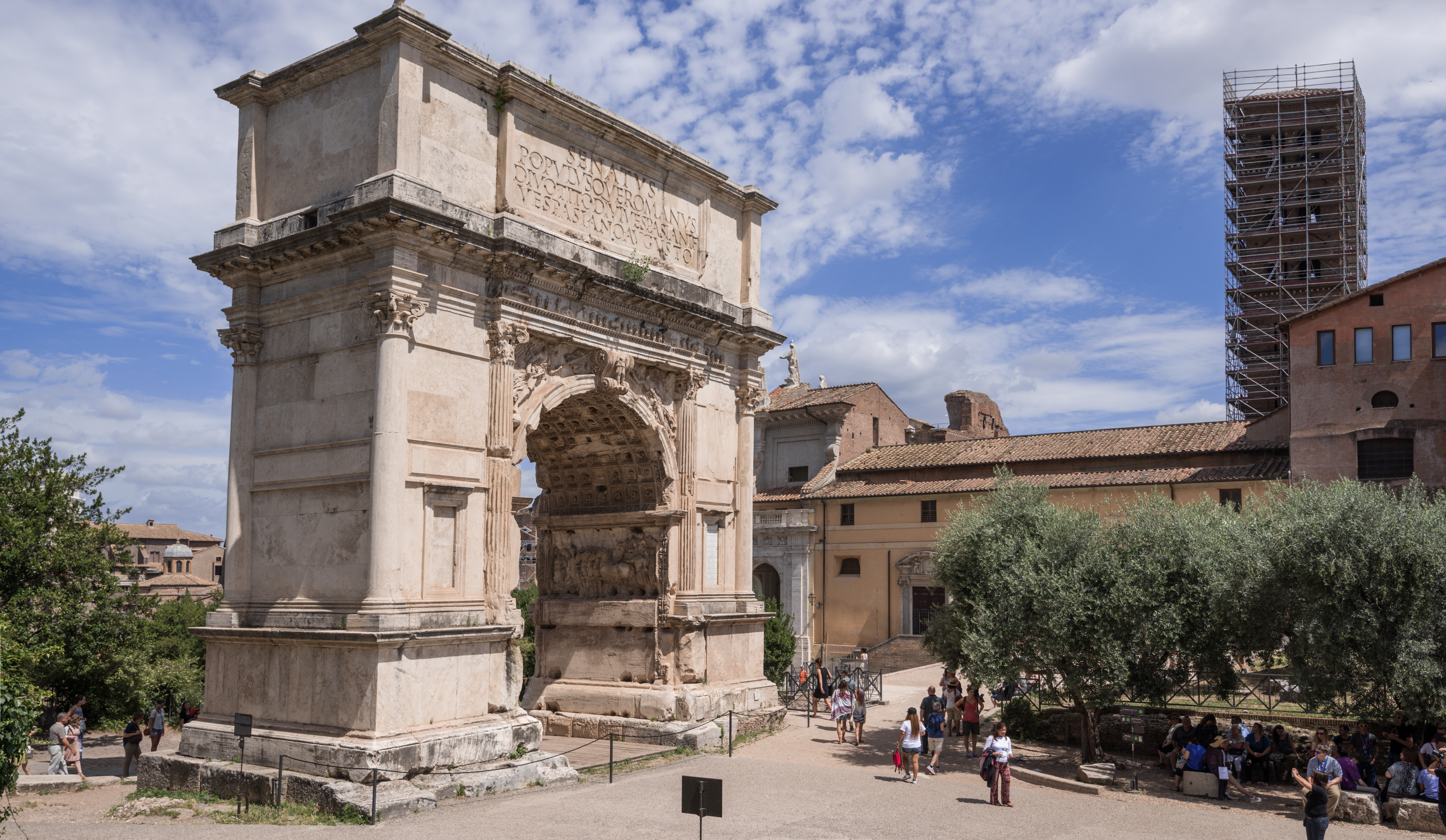
The Arch of Titus, built c. 81 on the Via Sacra, is one of the monumental structures in Rome commemorating the victory

The emperor Domitian (r. 81–96) continued to commemorate the victory, commissioning two triumphal arches that glorified the Flavian dynasty and its military success. Most prominent is the Arch of Titus, still standing along the Via Sacra, ancient Rome's main thoroughfare. Built shortly after Titus's death, the arch was dedicated by the Senate and People of Rome to the deified Titus. Its interior reliefs portray soldiers parading the seven-branched menorah, the Table of Showbread, a golden cup, and silver trumpets, during the triumphal procession. On the opposite panel, Titus appears in a quadriga, crowned with a laurel wreath by Victoria, while Virtus, the personification of bravery and military strength, leads the chariot. The menorah depicted on the arch was later chosen as the emblem of Israel. A second triumphal arch, constructed c. 81, stood near the southeastern edge of the Circus Maximus, Rome's main chariot racing venue. Its inscription proclaimed that Titus "subdued the Jewish people and destroyed the city of Jerusalem, a feat either sought in vain by all generals, kings, and peoples before him or entirely untried," overlooking earlier conquests of the city.

=== Aelia Capitolina and the Bar Kokhba Revolt ===
In 129/130, the emperor Hadrian visited Judaea and founded the Roman colony of Aelia Capitolina on Jerusalem's ruins — a move widely regarded as a key trigger for the Bar Kokhba Revolt (132–136). The rebels established a short-lived independent Jewish state before it was crushed by Rome, leaving widespread destruction and depopulation across Judea proper. Hadrian renamed the province from Judaea to Syria Palaestina and barred Jews from entering Jerusalem and its vicinity. Aelia Capitolina itself grew into a modest town devoid of Jerusalem's former Jewish character. Its population included Roman legionaries and non-Jewish settlers, and its buildings included temples dedicated to Roman deities, in contrast to the Temple that had once dominated the city.

For the following five centuries, Roman authorities permitted Jews to enter Jerusalem only once a year, on Tisha B'Av (Ninth of Av), to mourn the Temple's destruction. A Christian pilgrim from Bordeaux who visited the city in 333 recorded that Jews would come annually to anoint a perforated stone, then "bewail themselves with groans, rend their garments, and so depart." Under the emperor Julian (r. 361–363), Jews were briefly permitted to return, and may have begun efforts to rebuild the Temple, but the project was halted by a natural disaster (possibly an earthquake) and ended for good with Julian's death shortly afterward. Apart from this episode and another brief respite during the short-lived Sasanian conquest, Jews were not permitted to resettle in Jerusalem until after the Muslim conquest in the 630s. The Temple Mount itself appears to have remained largely in ruins, until the Umayyad caliph Abd al-Malik built the Dome of the Rock there in the 690s.

=== Fate of the temple treasures ===
While most of the Temple treasures were publicly displayed in Rome's Temple of Peace, items such as the purple curtains and a Torah scroll were instead deposited within the imperial palace. Rabbinic tradition attributed to Eliezer ben Jose (possibly dated to c. 170 CE) recounts that he saw a golden diadem and the curtain in Rome, possibly in Vespasian's private treasury. A slightly later source mentions these objects along with the menorah and the Table of Showbread.

In the 6th century, the Byzantine historian Procopius recorded that the Jewish treasures Titus had carried off from Jerusalem were among the trophies paraded in Constantinople in 534 after the Vandalic War. He states that these had previously been taken to Carthage by the Vandal king Gaiseric, after his sack of Rome in 455. During the procession, a Jewish onlooker reportedly warned that these objects belonged only in the place originally designated by King Solomon, and that their possession had empowered both Gaiseric and now Belisarius in conquest. Alarmed by the warning, the Byzantine emperor Justinian ordered that the items be sent to Christian shrines in Jerusalem. Some later medieval sources claimed that the treasures remained in Rome. The seven-branched lamp depicted in the apse mosaic of Santi Cosma e Damiano in the city has been associated by art historian John Osborne with the menorah. If the objects remained in Jerusalem after Justinian sent them there, they were likely lost during the Sasanian sack of the city in 614.

== Jewish responses ==
The destruction of the Second Temple marked a turning point in Jewish history, transforming Jewish identity and practice. With the loss of its religious and national center, Judaism had to adapt to displacement and uncertainty. The collapse of the Temple cult brought an end to the High Priesthood, rendered sacrificial rites impossible, and led to the decline of sectarianism. In response, new forms of worship and religious practice emerged. The Pharisees, one of the leading sects of late Second Temple Judaism, emerged as the central influence reshaping Jewish religious life. Their tradition gave rise to the rabbinic movement, which maintained close connections with the Pharisees without being exclusively Pharisaic, adopting the broader identity of "sages of Israel". This movement emphasized Torah study, communal prayer, and acts of loving-kindness, inaugurating a new era in the absence of both the Temple and Jewish sovereignty.

The Temple's destruction prompted theological reflection. Drawing on the precedent of Jerusalem's destruction by the Babylonians in 586/587 BCE, many Jews saw their suffering as a divine consequence of moral or religious transgressions. The idea that exile resulted from disobedience but that repentance could restore divine favor had been reinforced when the Persian king Cyrus allowed exiled Jews to return and rebuild the temple c. 538 BCE. However, while the Second Temple was rebuilt within some seventy years of the destruction of the First, the Romans did not allow a similar reconstruction after its destruction, leaving Jewish expectations unfulfilled.

=== Apocalyptic literature ===
The destruction prompted a resurgence of Jewish apocalyptic literature, which sought to interpret the destruction of the Temple and expressed hopes for its restoration. Two apocalypses of the period drew on the Babylonian destruction of Jerusalem, an event already central to the Hebrew Bible, as a framework for understanding the more recent catastrophe.

Blessed is he who was not born, or he who was born and died. But we, the living—woe to us, for we have seen the afflictions of Zion, and what has befallen Jerusalem ...

And you, heaven, keep your dew within you, and do not open the treasuries of rain. And you, sun, keep the light of your rays within you. And you, moon, extinguish the multitude of your light. For why should the light rise again, when the light of Zion is darkened? ...

And you, bridegrooms, do not enter, and do not let the brides adorn themselves. And you, wives, do not pray to bear children, for the barren will rejoice more.

— 2 Baruch 10:6–16 (translated by Albertus Klijn)

One such work is 2 Baruch, (Note: This text was preserved in Syriac, but widely believed to have been originally composed in Hebrew, likely in the late first century CE.) a pseudepigraphal text ascribed to Baruch ben Neriah. Baruch was a scribe of Jeremiah who lived at the time of the First Temple's destruction, though it was actually composed after the Second Temple's fall. It begins with God telling Baruch that Jerusalem is about to fall because of the people's sins, and instructing him to warn others to flee. Baruch protests that he would rather die than see the city taken and that its destruction will erase Israel's legacy; God replies that the true Jerusalem is preserved in heaven, untouched. Baruch then calls on both humanity and the natural world to join the mourning. The work ends with Baruch urging those left in the land to keep the Law, and writing to the exiles in Assyria and Babylonia to remain faithful as they await redemption.

4 Ezra, a work dated to the reign of Domitian (81–96), features a series of dialogues between the biblical scribe Ezra and the angel Uriel. Ezra is deeply shaken upon witnessing "the desolation of Zion and the wealth of those who lived in Babylon"; he asks why should Israel remain faithful when obedience has brought ruin, and why do its oppressors flourish. Uriel's answer, that Ezra himself is righteous and will be rewarded, leaves him unpersuaded. The second half turns to visions of the end of days. (Note: Some scholars interpret these visions as a resolution to Ezra's doubts. In one of these visions, Ezra sees an eagle with twelve large wings, eight smaller ones, and three heads; as its parts vanish one by one, a lion rebukes it, and it is consumed by flames. The angel explains that the eagle represents the fourth kingdom of Daniel's vision, while the lion symbolizes the Messiah bringing judgment (4 Ezra 11:1–12:36). In another vision, Ezra is commissioned to restore the Law, first warning the people that their suffering comes from disobedience, and then dictating 94 books, with 24 made public and 70 reserved for the wise.) The text holds that divine justice, though not immediately visible, will ultimately be revealed when Israel is restored and its enemies punished. Rome is destined to fall by divine judgment through the Messiah, a future liberator of the Jewish people. One of the Sibylline Oracles, a Jewish prophecy from the post-destruction era, frames the eruption of Mount Vesuvius in 79 as divine punishment for Jerusalem's destruction.

=== The destruction in rabbinic literature ===
Rabbinic literature engages with the fall of Jerusalem through stories, traditions, exegeses, and teachings that developed over the centuries. The rabbis attributed it to internal causes—factional conflict, the misuse of wealth, failures of leadership, neglect of communal responsibility, and sin. This interpretation followed the biblical tradition that Jerusalem's divine protection was forfeited through Israel's transgressions, with Rome's victory understood as punishment.

Early rabbinic works, composed by the Tannaim—the sages active from Jerusalem's destruction until the early 3rd century—reflect deep sorrow and anguish over the loss of the Temple. The Mishnah laments that with the destruction, "faithful men came to an end", and since that time, "there has been no day without its curse". Similarly, Avot de-Rabbi Natan states that the world was blessed while the Temple service continued, and that blessing departed once it ceased.

Due to what reason was the First Temple destroyed? ... Idol worship, forbidden sexual relations, and bloodshed ... why was the Second Temple destroyed? ... due to the fact that there was wanton hatred during that period. This comes to teach you that the sin of wanton hatred is equivalent to the three severe transgressions: Idol worship, forbidden sexual relations and bloodshed.

— Babylonian Talmud, Yoma, 9b (Noé Edition Koren, commentary by Rabbi Adin Steinsaltz)

The Babylonian Talmud (Gittin 55b–57a) provides an extensive narrative detailing the city's destruction and the factors that led to it. Another account, rich with interpretive homilies, appears in Lamentations Rabbah, particularly in its opening sections. The Yoma tractate of the Babylonian Talmud explains that the Second Temple fell due to the grave sin of baseless hatred (שִׂנְאַת חִנָּם; sin'at ḥinnam).

One of the most famous Talmudic tales explaining the destruction is the story of Kamsa and Bar Kamsa. In this account, a wealthy man in Jerusalem mistakenly invited his enemy, Bar Kamsa, to a banquet instead of his friend, Kamsa. When Bar Kamsa arrived, he was publicly humiliated and expelled despite offering to pay for the entire feast, while the attending sages remained silent. Seeking revenge, Bar Kamsa told the Roman emperor that the Jews had rebelled against Rome, triggering a chain of events that ultimately led to war. (Note: According to the story, Bar Kamsa told the emperor that the Jews had rebelled and suggested he test their loyalty by sending an offering to the Temple. The emperor dispatched a calf with Bar Kamsa, who secretly inflicted a blemish on it, one that rendered it unfit for sacrifice under Jewish law. The priests then debated whether to sacrifice the animal anyway, to avoid offending Rome, or to kill Bar Kamsa to keep him from reporting the refusal; Rabbi Zechariah ben Abkilus objected to both proposals, and neither was carried out. The narrative holds his excessive scrupulousness responsible for the Temple's destruction.) Another tale describes how three wealthy men—Ben Kalba Sabua, Naqdimon ben Gurion, and Ben Sisit Hakkeset—had stockpiled enough to sustain the city for twenty-one years; the revolutionaries (Jewish Babylonian Aramaic: baryoni) burned the stores to make surrender impossible and force the city to fight.

Rabbinic literature refers to Titus as "Titus the Wicked", portraying him as arrogant and blasphemous, and emphasizing that although Israel's enemies may gain power, they serve only as instruments of divine wrath destined for punishment. One legend recounts that Titus desecrated the Holy of Holies, the Temple's innermost chamber, by having intercourse with a prostitute on a Torah scroll before slashing the veil with his sword, causing it to bleed. The legend continues that a gnat flew into Titus's nose and gnawed at his brain until he died. (Note: These legends speak of a "Yattush", which may refer to either a mosquito or a gnat. According to the Babylonian Talmud, the creature grew in his head for seven years before he died. According to Genesis Rabbah, an autopsy after his death revealed a two-pound bird inside his head, while Leviticus Rabbah recounts that Titus requested a procedure to determine how he had been punished by the God of Israel.)

Rabbinic literature records visits to Jerusalem's ruins. One account describes Rabbi Akiva and three colleagues coming up to the ruined Temple Mount and seeing a fox emerge from the place where the Holy of Holies had stood. The others wept; Akiva laughed, explaining that now that Uriah's prophecy of desolation had been fulfilled, Zechariah's prophecy of Jerusalem's restoration would be fulfilled too. Additional rabbinic texts portray God, along with Moses, the patriarchs, prophets, and angels, as mourning Jerusalem's destruction.

=== Ben Zakkai, Yavneh, and the emergence of the Rabbinic movement ===
According to rabbinic sources, (Note: The episode is referenced in five works: Avot de-Rabbi Natan (Versions A and B), Midrash Lamentations, the Babylonian Talmud (Gittin), and Midrash Proverbs, with notable differences in the traditions.) the prominent sage Rabban Yohanan ben Zakkai (Ribaz) was hidden in a coffin and smuggled out of Jerusalem during the siege. After meeting Vespasian and prophesying his rise to the throne, (Note: According to legend, Ben Zakkai quoted a prophecy from Isaiah (10:34): "And the Lebanon shall fall by a majestic one." In this context, "Lebanon" is understood to refer to the temple, constructed from the cedars of Lebanon, while "majestic one" is interpreted as referring to Vespasian.) he secured the establishment of a rabbinic center in Yavneh. From there, he and his disciples laid the groundwork for the transformation of Jerusalem. A passage in Avot de-Rabbi Natan illustrates this shift, recounting how Ben Zakkai consoled his disciple, Joshua ben Hananiah, by teaching that acts of loving-kindness are equivalent to the temple's sacrificial atonement.

The rabbinic approach called for restrained mourning that did not disrupt daily life. Some Jews adopted ascetic practices, while others retreated to caves for fasting and awaited redemption. A debate in the Tosefta Sotah and Babylonian Talmud (Bava Batra 60b) recounts Rabbi Joshua countering those advocating abstention from meat and wine due to their role in temple offerings. He argued this logic would require abandoning bread, fruit, and water, leaving his opponents speechless. He also reminded them of the rabbinic enactment to leave a small section unpainted when plastering a new home as a memorial for Jerusalem.

Once as Rabban Johanan ben Zakkai was coming forth from Jerusalem, Rabbi Joshua followed after him and beheld the temple in ruins. "Woe unto us!" Rabbi Joshua cried, "that this, the place where the iniquities of Israel were atoned for, is laid waste!" "My son," Rabban Johanan said to him, "be not grieved; we have another atonement as effective as this. And what is it? It is acts of loving-kindness, as it is said, "For I desire mercy and not sacrifice" (Hosea 6:6).

— Avot de-Rabbi Natan, Version A, 4:5 (Translated by Judah Goldin)

The period after the Temple's destruction saw Ribaz assume a leading role in reshaping Judaism. He is credited with introducing several enactments (taqqanot) which adapted Jewish religious practices to function in the absence of the Temple. (Note: Such enactments appear in Mishnah, Rosh Hashanah 4:1–4) Among these, it was decreed that if Rosh Hashanah fell on a Shabbat, the shofar could be blown in any location with a court, rather than only in the Temple. Similarly, during Sukkot, the lulav was permitted to be carried outside Jerusalem for all seven days of the festival. Jewish prayer was also formalized, with the Amidah ("the Standing Prayer") becoming a central prayer recited three times daily, its timing linked to the Temple sacrifices. (Note: The Mishnah (Berakhot 1.1) and Tosefta (Berakhot 3.1–3) acknowledged a correlation between prayer and sacrificial offerings but did not equate the two; Amoraic sources first introduce prayer as a substitute (Jerusalem Talmud, Berakhot 4, 1, 7b; Babylonian Talmud, Berakhot 26b), a notion later expanded to portray it, along with other rituals, as superior.) The priestly class maintained its influence by contributing to synagogue liturgy and possibly to biblical translations. The establishment of the center at Yavneh fostered a structured and authoritative system of rabbinic scholarship, shaping Jewish life through the integration of oral tradition with the written Torah. These efforts later led to the compilation of the Mishnah and the two Talmuds, which became central sources of Jewish law and guidance.

== Legacy and cultural impact ==
=== In Jewish tradition and culture ===
The destruction of Jerusalem marked a profound turning point for the Jewish people, and Jewish political control over the city would not resume until the 20th century. (Note: Jewish political control over part of Jerusalem returned with the establishment of Israel in 1948. Between 1948 and 1967, the city was divided, with Israel controlling the western part and Jordan the eastern part, including the Old City. The Jordanian-held areas came under Israeli control during the 1967 war.) Even so, Jerusalem remained central to Jewish religious life and identity throughout this long period. Hope for Jerusalem's restoration and renewed Jewish nationhood persisted in literature, prayer, song, and art.

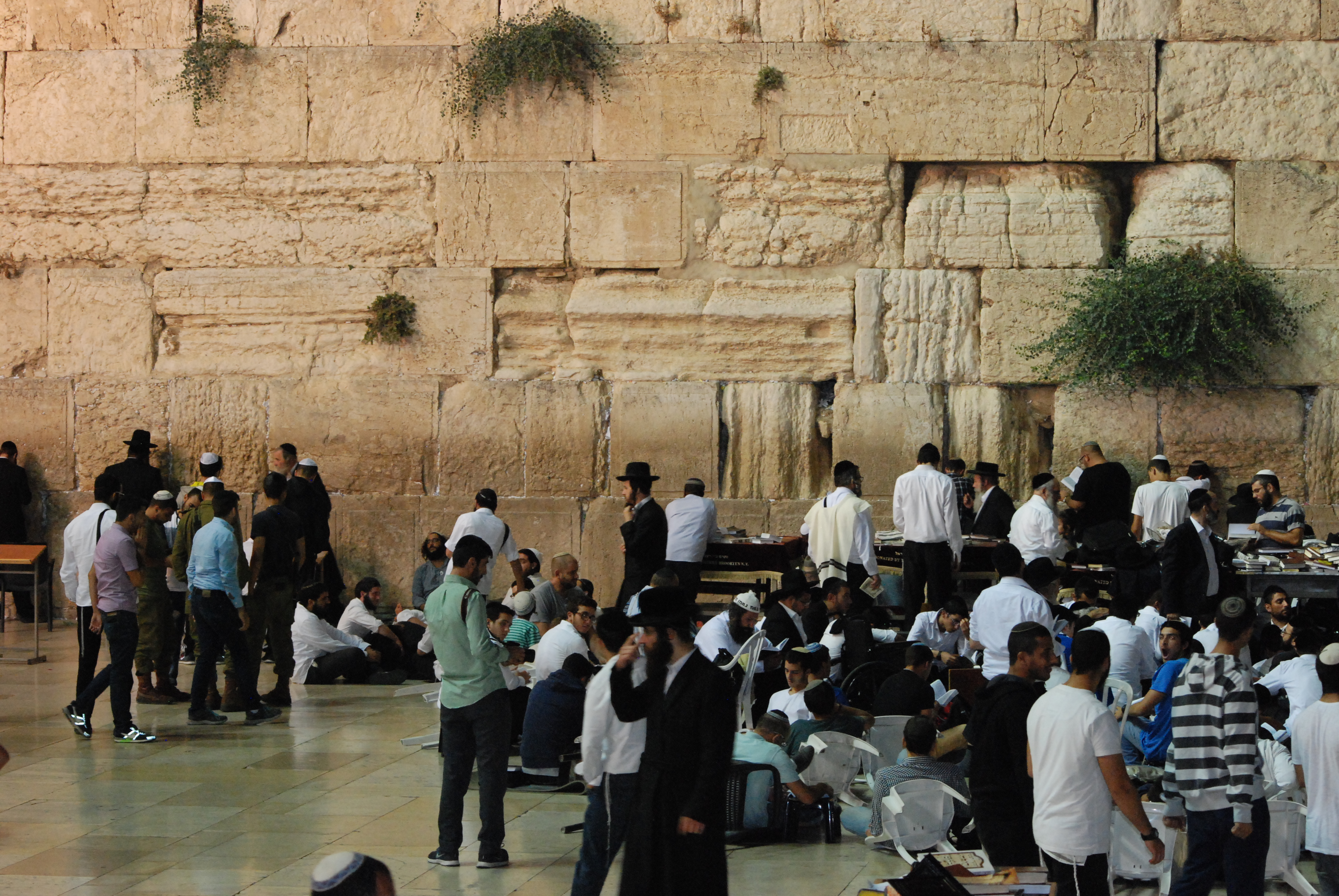
Jews praying at the Western Wall, a remnant of the retaining walls of the Temple Mount, during Tisha B'Av, a fast day commemorating the destruction of the Temples

In Judaism, the destruction of the Second Temple is commemorated on Tisha B'Av, a major fast day that also marks the destruction of the First Temple, along with other catastrophic events in Jewish history, including the fall of Betar and the expulsion of Jews from Spain. On this day, special qinnot (Hebrew dirges) are recited as part of the prayer service, and the Book of Lamentations is read. For three weeks leading up to this day, special prophetic readings are recited in the synagogue, and practices such as weddings, haircuts, and eating meat are prohibited during the first eight days of Av. The Western Wall, (Note: It has sometimes been referred to as the "Wailing Wall" due to the lamentations historically performed there.) the most substantial remnant of the Second Temple, has long served as a focal point for Jewish prayer and mourning, symbolizing both the loss of the Jewish homeland and hopes for its restoration.

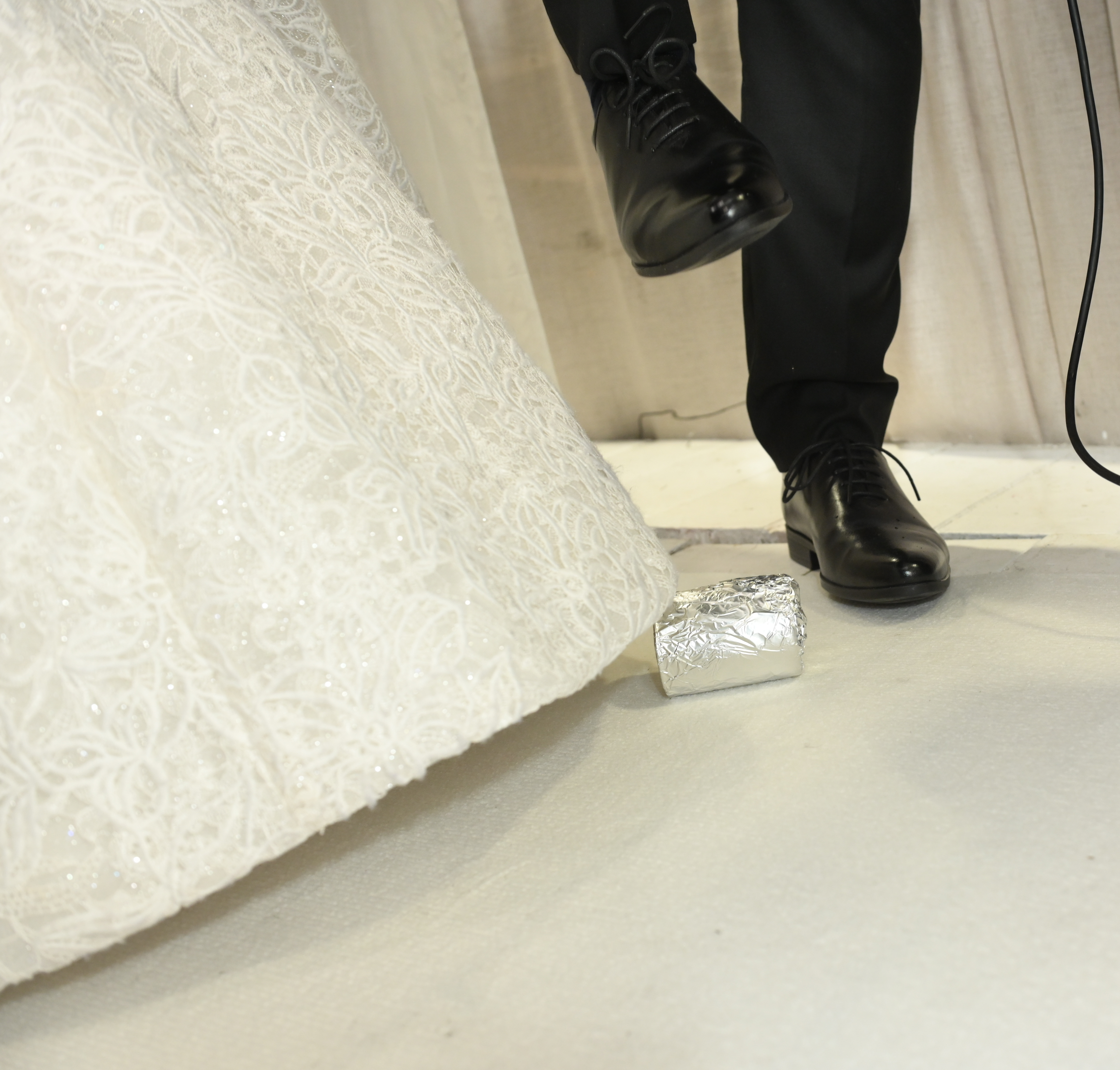
A groom breaks a glass underfoot during a Jewish wedding ceremony, a symbolic act commemorating the Temple's destruction

The destruction is also recalled in lifecycle rituals. At Jewish weddings, the groom breaks a glass to commemorate the Temple's destruction, often accompanied by a recitation of Psalm 137:5–6: "If I forget you, O Jerusalem, Let my right hand wither." Other mourning traditions include leaving a section of a home unpainted or refraining from wearing a full set of jewellery on joyous occasions. In late antiquity, some Jewish communities began dating life events from the Temple's destruction. (Note: In Zoara, south of the Dead Sea, this system was regularly used in the Jewish cemetery. One inscription, for a woman named Marsa, records her death as occurring on "17 Elul, the fourth year of shemitah, 362 years after the temple's destruction." Similarly, a lintel inscription at the 6th-century Nabratein synagogue in Upper Galilee notes that the building was constructed "494 years after the destruction of the Temple".) A common expression of comfort during funerary customs, both in the cemetery and afterward, is "May God comfort you among the mourners of Zion and Jerusalem." "Next Year in Jerusalem" is a recurring declaration during various points of the Hebrew calendar, notably at the Passover Seder.

Jews, both individually and in groups, attempted to return to Jerusalem throughout history, with notable cases including Judah Halevi in the 12th century and the followers of Sabbatai Zevi in the 17th century. The Talmuds, compiled in the 4th and 5th centuries, provide detailed prescriptions for mourning rituals observed by pilgrims visiting Jerusalem, including guidelines for tearing garments and reciting prayers when witnessing the ruins of Judea, Jerusalem, and the Temple. Lekha Dodi, a central piyyut (liturgical poem) recited during the welcoming of Shabbat, was composed in 16th-century Safed and devotes five of its nine stanzas to Jerusalem, mourning its destruction and expressing hope for its restoration. The rebuilding of the Temple and the restoration of sacrifices remain central themes in Orthodox Jewish liturgy.

Jewish diaspora communities preserved legends of their ancestors' exile from Jerusalem. A tradition recorded among Jews of Spain holds that their ancestors were taken there following the city's fall to Titus, with the earliest reference appearing in Seder Olam Zuta (c. 800 CE). One tradition holds that Jerusalemite exiles named the city of Toledo, linking it to the Hebrew words toledot or tulaytula, meaning "migration" or "wandering". The medieval Abu Albalia family traced its ancestry to Baruch, a skilled silk weaver who, according to their tradition, was sent by Titus to Mérida along with other noble Jerusalemite families at the request of the local governor. Similar traditions appear in medieval Italian sources. The eleventh-century Chronicle of Ahimaaz and later manuscripts of Josippon recount that around 5,000 captives taken by Titus were relocated to various cities in Apulia, including Oria, Otranto, and Trani.

The memory of the destruction continues to resonate in modern Israeli culture. Accepting the Nobel Prize in 1966, Israeli author Shmuel Yosef Agnon told the audience that he had been born in one of the cities of the Exile because Titus had destroyed Jerusalem, but that he had always considered himself "one who was born in Jerusalem." Anthropologist Nadia Abu El-Haj has argued that the Burnt House and Herodian Quarter emphasize the "splendor and destruction" of Herodian Jerusalem within a broader Israeli national-historical discourse, connecting the ancient city to the modern reconstruction of the Jewish Quarter.

The destruction has also featured in Zionist and Israeli political rhetoric. In December 1918, reflecting on the foundation ceremony of the Hebrew University on Mount Scopus several months earlier, Chaim Weizmann, then a leading Zionist statesman and later Israel's first president, wrote: "Here we are, on the very mountain from which Titus destroyed Jerusalem, laying the foundation-stone of this institution which will rebuild a regenerated Judaea." In December 1949, days after the UN General Assembly reiterated that Jerusalem should be placed under international administration, Israel's first prime minister David Ben-Gurion told the Knesset that Israel would not accept the loss of its sovereignty over the city. He stated that the Jewish people had twice been driven from Jerusalem, first by Babylon and later by Rome, yet argued that the nation's bond with the city remained "no less deep than in the days of Nebuchadnezzar and Titus Flavius." He added that those who had defended Jerusalem during the 1948 Arab–Israeli War had shown the same courage as their ancestors during the Temple periods, and declared that after twenty-five centuries of remaining faithful to Jerusalem, the nation would not give it up. Days later, the Knesset and government relocated to Jerusalem.

=== In Christian theology ===
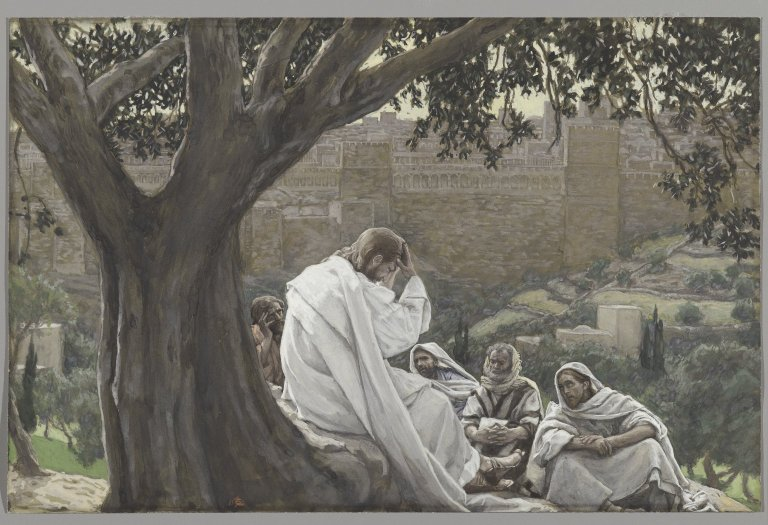
Early Christians interpreted the destruction of the Temple as the fulfillment of Jesus's prophecy, as recorded in the Gospels. "The Prophecy of the Destruction of the Temple", painting by James Tissot

In some early Christian texts, the destruction of Jerusalem was depicted as divine punishment for the Jewish people's rejection of Jesus, drawing on the prophetic tradition in which sin brings divine retribution. The Gospels—beginning with the Gospel of Mark, composed c. 70—contain prophecies attributed to Jesus foretelling the destruction of Jerusalem and the Temple (Mark 13, Matthew 24, Luke 21), with the Gospel of Matthew possibly alluding to the burning of the city. The Epistle of Barnabas (written between 70 and 135) framed the destruction as evidence that God had rejected the physical Temple in favor of a new, spiritual one, embodied in the faith and conversion of Gentile believers. Justin Martyr, writing after 135, interpreted the Temple's destruction as punishment for the crucifixion of Jesus, and viewed the second revolt as sealing Jerusalem's desolation—a sign, in his view, that the Temple cult and God's covenant with the Jewish people were temporary and had now been superseded by the Church.

According to 4th-century Church Fathers Eusebius and Epiphanius, the Christian community in Jerusalem fled to Pella in Transjordan after receiving divine instruction, thereby avoiding the city's destruction. The account has been questioned because of its late attestation, its mention of a divine warning, and the fact that Pella itself was attacked by Jewish rebels during the war. Some scholars suggest the community simply fled as others did; others that they surrendered to Rome and were resettled at Pella.

By the late 4th century, Christian writers reinforced these theological readings. John Chrysostom told his congregation that Christ, after being crucified, had destroyed the Jews' city, dispersed their people, and scattered the nation across the earth — proof, he argued, that Jesus was risen and reigning. Jerome described Jews paying for the right to enter the city once a year and mourning amid its ruins — ragged old men and wailing women, in his telling, displaying God's wrath in their very bodies and appearance, while the cross gleamed from the Mount of Olives. (Note: Theological interpretations persisted into the modern period. In the 1890s, Brooke Foss Westcott, Bishop of Durham, called Jerusalem's fall "the most significant national event" in world history, arguing that once the "more perfect Tabernacle" (i.e., Jesus) had been rejected, the temple was "necessarily doomed to final desolation.")

=== In art, literature and popular culture ===
Jerusalem's fall has inspired writers and artists since antiquity. An early medieval depiction appears on the Franks Casket, an 8th-century whalebone box from Anglo-Saxon England. Its back panel portrays the city's capture in a way seemingly informed by Josephus. The scene is labeled with the words "judgement" and "hostage", alongside an inscription interpreted as: "Here Titus and the Jews fight. Here its inhabitants flee from Jerusalem." Medieval Christian literature developed legends in which Vespasian and Titus were depicted as Christian heroes who converted after miraculous healings by Saint Veronica's relic. Their conversion was followed by their taking vengeance against the Jewish people. The legend's roots go back to De Pylato, a Latin prose text possibly written in the 11th century. It laid the groundwork for later works like the 12th-century La Destruction de Jerusalem and the 13th-century Legenda Aurea. A related narrative appears in the 14th-century Middle English alliterative poem Siege of Jerusalem, which portrays the event as "a crusade to avenge Christ's death," as described by medieval literature scholar Christine Chism. The city's fall is mentioned several times in Dante's Divine Comedy (c. 1321), where the "good Titus" is portrayed as an instrument of divine retribution.

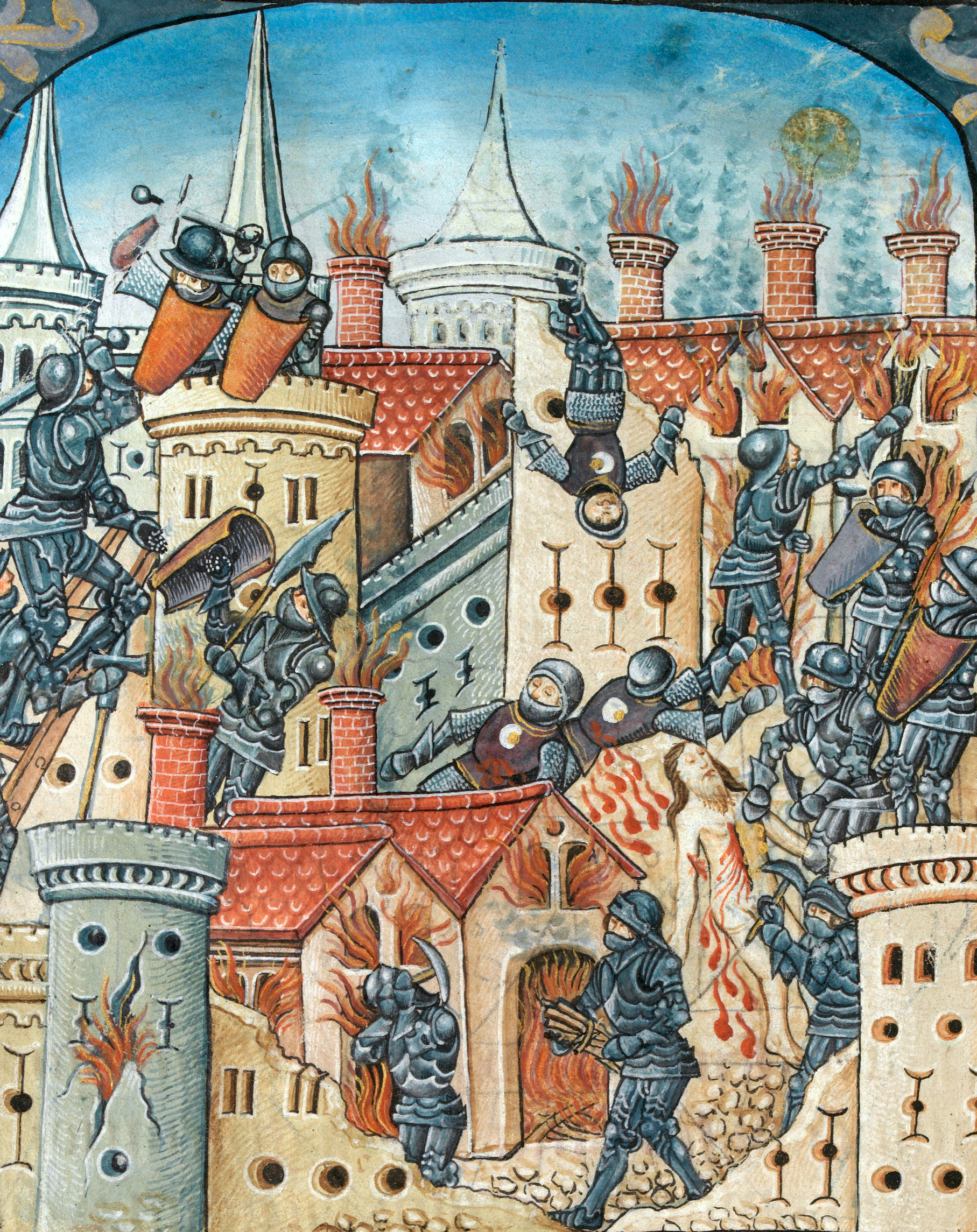
Medieval illumination of the siege and destruction of Jerusalem, from the Vaux Passional (c. 1504)

By the 17th century, artists began to adopt a more complex and ambivalent view of the event, marking a shift from earlier anti-Jewish readings. In his The Destruction of the Temple at Jerusalem (1638), French baroque painter Nicolas Poussin drew on Josephus to depict the siege as a scene of chaos and brutality. Rather than portraying Titus as a triumphant conqueror, Poussin depicted him as a conflicted figure, distressed by the ruin of the temple. In contrast, The Destruction of Jerusalem by Titus (1846) by German painter Wilhelm von Kaulbach follows the medieval Christian tradition, portraying the event as divine punishment, with avenging angels assisting Titus and the figure of the Wandering Jew being driven out by demons. Another 19th-century depiction is Destruction of Jerusalem by the Romans by Scottish orientalist painter David Roberts, who based his dramatic composition on sketches made during his 1839 visit to Jerusalem, though he took theatrical liberties with both the events and the city's topography. A painting by Italian Romantic painter Francesco Hayez (1867) reflects the Romantic nationalism associated with Giuseppe Verdi and places the menorah at the center of the Temple's destruction.

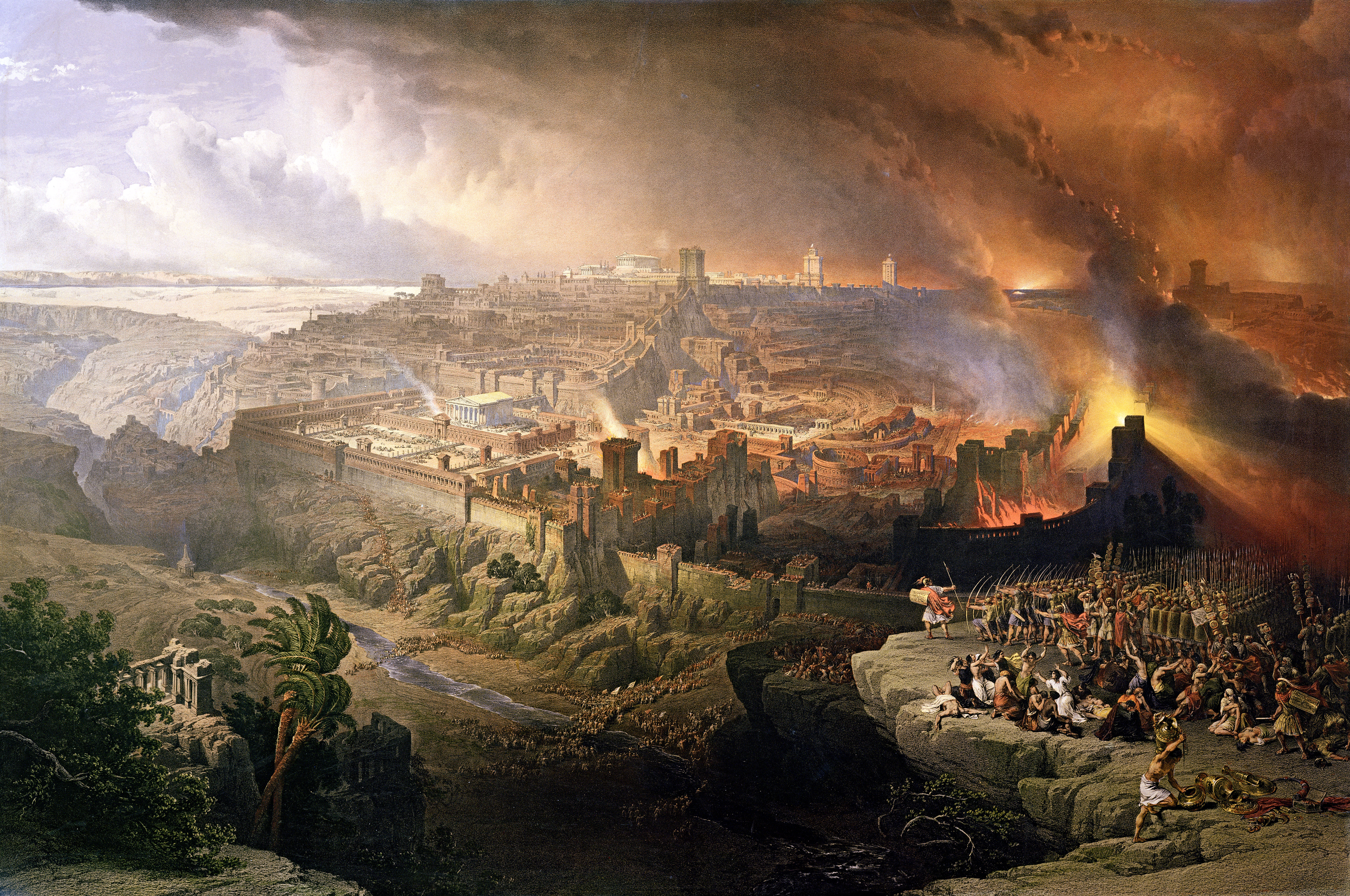
The Siege and Destruction of Jerusalem, by David Roberts (1850). Roberts took considerable artistic liberties to create a dramatized panorama of the events

In early modern England, the destruction of Jerusalem was seen as a mirror for national introspection. Writers across genres came to identify Protestant England with the besieged Jews, while Catholic powers were recast as the modern Romans. The 1618 poem Canaan's Calamity presents the Romans as seeking "this Holy City to defile". Preacher Samuel Rolle compared Jerusalem's destruction to the Great Fire of London, hinting that Romanists may have been behind both. In Paradise Lost (1667), Milton presents Jerusalem's destruction as a redemptive loss, like Eden's fall, pointing beyond judgment to spiritual renewal and the hope of the New Jerusalem. This perspective fostered a more empathetic identification with Jews among the English.

In the modern era, Jerusalem's destruction has been portrayed in novels and films. In his novel Les Misérables (1862), Victor Hugo wrote that the massacre at Jerusalem diminishes Titus, and warned against the man who leaves behind a shadow in his own shape. Henry Rider Haggard's The Pearl-Maiden (1903) uses the fall of Jerusalem as its backdrop, telling the story of Mariam, a young Christian woman, and her love for Marcus, a Roman soldier. More recently, the Israeli animated film Legend of Destruction (2021), directed by Gidi Dar, dramatized the siege of Jerusalem using still paintings and a voice cast, with Talmudic figure Ben Batiach as a central character; the film won four Ophir Awards.

== See also ==
- Fiscus Judaicus
- List of incidents of cannibalism
- Preterism
- Siege of Betar
- Timeline of the Second Temple period

== Sources ==
=== Ancient sources ===
==== Josephus ====
- Josephus (1926). The Life, Against Apion. Loeb Classical Library: Josephus. Vol. 1. Translated by Thackeray, Henry St. John. Cambridge, MA: Harvard University Press. OCLC 907470641.
- Josephus (1927a). The Jewish War, Books I–II. Loeb Classical Library: Josephus. Translated by Thackeray, Henry St. John. Cambridge, MA: Harvard University Press. OCLC 942995559.
- Josephus (1927b). The Jewish War, Books III–IV. Loeb Classical Library: Josephus. Translated by Thackeray, Henry St. John. Cambridge, MA: Harvard University Press. OCLC 942995339.
- Josephus (1928). The Jewish War, Books V–VIII. Loeb Classical Library: Josephus. Translated by Thackeray, Henry St. John. Cambridge, MA: Harvard University Press. OCLC 942992973.

==== Apocalypses ====
- "2 (Syriac Apocalypse of) Baruch (Early Second Century AD)". The Old Testament Pseudepigrapha. Vol. 1: Apocalyptic Literature and Testaments. Translated by Klijn, A. F. J. Garden City, NY: Doubleday. 1983. pp. 615–652. ISBN 0-385-09630-5.
- "4 Ezra (Late First Century AD)". The Old Testament Pseudepigrapha. Vol. 1: Apocalyptic Literature and Testaments. Translated by Metzger, Bruce M. Garden City, NY: Doubleday. 1983. pp. 517–560. ISBN 0-385-09630-5.

==== Greco-Roman literature ====
- Cassius Dio (1925). Roman History: Books 61–70. Loeb Classical Library: Dio Cassius. Vol. VIII. Translated by Cary, Earnest. Cambridge, MA: Oxford University Press. OCLC 50585209.
- Pliny (1942). Natural History: Books 3–7. Loeb Classical Library: Pliny. Vol. II. Translated by Rackham, Harris. Harvard University Press. OCLC 1091974962.
- Sulpicius Severus (2015). Chronica. Ancient Christian Writers. Vol. 70. Translated by Goodrich, Richard J. Newman Press. ISBN 978-1-587-68524-8.
- Tacitus (1931). Histories: Books 4–5. Annals: Books 1–3. Loeb Classical Library: Tacitus. Translated by Moore, Clifford H. Cambridge, MA: Harvard University Press. OCLC 2026323.

==== Christian literature ====
- Chrysostom's Homilies Against the Jews: an English Translation (PhD thesis). Translated by Maxwell, C. Mervyn. University of Chicago. 1966.
- Eusebius (1926). Ecclesiastical History: Books 1–5. Loeb Classical Library: Eusebius. Vol. 1. Translated by Lake, Kirsopp. Cambridge, MA: Harvard University Press. OCLC 899735654.
- Jerome (2016). "Commentary on Zephaniah". Commentaries on the Twelve Prophets. Ancient Christian Texts. Vol. 1. Translated by Scheck, Thomas P. InterVarsity Press. pp. 114–158. ISBN 978-0-830-82916-3.
- Malalas, John (1986). Chronicle. Byzantina Australiensia. Melbourne: Australian Association for Byzantine Studies. ISBN 978-0959363623.

==== Rabbinic literature ====
- Avot de-Rabbi Natan [The Fathers According to Rabbi Nathan]. The Yale Judaica Series. Translated by Goldin, Judah. New Haven, CT: Yale University Press. 1990. ISBN 978-0-300-04697-7.
- Avot de-Rabbi Natan [The Fathers According to Rabbi Nathan]. Translated by Saldarini, Anthony J. Leiden: Brill. 1975. ISBN 978-9-004-04294-0.
- Babylonian Talmud: A Translation and Commentary. Translated by Neusner, Jacob. Peabody, Massachusetts: Hendrickson Publishers. 2011. ISBN 978-1-59856-526-3.
- Jerusalem Talmud – First Order: Zeraim – Tractate Berakhot. Studia Judaica. Vol. 18. Translated by Guggenheimer, Heinrich W. De Gruyter Brill. 2000. ISBN 978-3-110-16591-3.
- Lamentations Rabbah: An Analytical Translation. Neusner Titles In Brown Judaic Studies. Translated by Neusner, Jacob. University Of South Florida. 1989. ISBN 978-1-555-40412-3.
- Mishnah. Translated by Neusner, Jacob. New Haven, CT: Yale University Press. 1991. ISBN 978-0-300-05022-6.

=== Modern sources ===
- Agnon, Shmuel Yosef (1967). "Nobel Banquet Address". Hebrew Abstracts. 11. National Association of Professors of Hebrew (NAPH): 5–9. ISSN 0438-895X. JSTOR 45275410.
- Alexander, Philip (2024). "A Tale of Two Cities: Rome and Jerusalem in Jewish Eschatology between 70 CE and 135 CE". In Czajkowski, Kimberley; Friedman, David A. (eds.). Looking In, Looking Out: Jews and Non-Jews in Mutual Contemplation. Supplements to the Journal for the Study of Judaism. Vol. 212. Leiden and Boston: Brill. pp. 203–222. doi:10.1163/9789004685055_013. ISBN 978-9-004-68503-1.
- Alon, Gedaliah (1977). Jews, Judaism and the Classical World: Studies in Jewish History in the Times of the Second Temple and Talmud. Jerusalem: Magnes Press. ISBN 978-9-652-23468-1.
- Ameling, Walter; Cotton, Hannah M.; Eck, Werner; Ecker, Avner, eds. (2023). "XLIV. Kefar Nevoraia". Volume 5/Part 1 Galilaea and Northern Regions: 5876–6924. De Gruyter. pp. 237–239. doi:10.1515/9783110715774-052. ISBN 978-3-11-071577-4.
- Avi-Hai, Avraham (22 December 2020). "Ben-Gurion did what he said he would do". The Jerusalem Post.
- Bahat, Dan (1999). "The Herodian Temple". In Horbury, William; Davies, W. D.; Sturdy, John (eds.). The Early Roman Period. The Cambridge History of Judaism. Vol. 3. Cambridge, UK: Cambridge University Press. pp. 38–58. ISBN 978-1-139-05366-2.
- Beard, Mary (2002). "The Triumph of Flavius Josephus". In Boyle, A. J.; Dominik, W. J. (eds.). Flavian Rome: Culture, Image, Text. Leiden: Brill. pp. 543–558. ISBN 978-9-004-11188-2.
- Belayche, Nicole (2001). Iudaea-Palaestina: The Pagan Cults in Roman Palestine (Second to Fourth Century). Tübingen: Mohr Siebeck. ISBN 978-3-161-47153-7.
- Ben-Ami, Doron; Tchekhanovets, Yana (2011). "Has the Adiabene Royal Family "Palace" Been Found in the City of David?". In Galor, Katharina; Avni, Gideon (eds.). Unearthing Jerusalem: 150 Years of Archaeological Research in the Holy City. Winona Lake, Indiana: Eisenbrauns. pp. 231–240. ISBN 978-1-57506-223-5.
- Bokser, Baruch M. (1983). "Rabbinic Responses to Catastrophe: From Continuity to Discontinuity". Proceedings of the American Academy for Jewish Research. 50. American Academy for Jewish Research: 37–61. doi:10.2307/3622688. ISSN 0065-6798. JSTOR 3622688.
- Bowers, W. P. (1975). "Jewish Communities in Spain in the Time of Paul the Apostle". The Journal of Theological Studies. New Series. 26 (2). Oxford University Press: 395–402. doi:10.1093/jts/XXVI.2.395. ISSN 0022-5185. JSTOR 23962030.
- Broshi, Magen (1999). "The Archaeology of Palestine 63 BCE–CE 70". In Horbury, William; Davies, W. D.; Sturdy, John (eds.). The Early Roman Period. The Cambridge History of Judaism. Vol. 3. Cambridge, UK: Cambridge University Press. pp. 1–37. ISBN 978-1-139-05366-2.
- Chism, Christine (1998). "The Siege of Jerusalem: Liquidating Assets" (PDF). Journal of Medieval and Early Modern Studies. 28: 309–340.
- Clarysse, Willy (2021). "The Jewish Presence in Graeco-Roman Egypt: The Evidence of the Papyri since the Corpus Papyrorum Judaicarum". In Salvesen, Alison; Pearce, Sarah; Frenkel, Miriam (eds.). Israel in Egypt: The Land of Egypt as Concept and Reality for Jews in Antiquity and the Early Medieval Period. Ancient Judaism and Early Christianity. Vol. 110. Leiden & Boston: Brill. pp. 305–325. ISBN 978-90-04-43539-1.
- Clements, Ruth A. (2012). "Temple and Identity in Early Christianity and in the Johannine Community: Reflections on the "Parting of the Ways"". In Schwartz, Daniel R.; Weiss, Zeev (eds.). Epilogue: 70 CE After 135 CE—The Making of a Watershed?. Leiden: Brill. pp. 517–536. ISBN 978-9-004-21534-4.
- Cohen, Shaye J. D. (1984). "The Significance of Yavneh: Pharisees, Rabbis, and the End of Jewish Sectarianism". Hebrew Union College Annual. 55: 27–53. ISSN 0360-9049. JSTOR 23507609.
- Cohen, Shaye J. D. (1999). "The Temple and the synagogue". In Horbury, William; Davies, W. D.; Sturdy, John (eds.). The Early Roman Period. The Cambridge History of Judaism. Vol. 3. Cambridge, UK: Cambridge University Press. pp. 298–325. ISBN 978-1-139-05366-2.
- Cohen, Shaye J. D. (2014). From Maccabees To Mishnah (3rd ed.). Louisville, Kentucky: Westminster John Knox Press. ISBN 978-0-664-23904-6.
- Cotton, Hannah M.; Di Segni, Leah; Eck, Werner; Isaac, Benjamin; Kushnir-Stein, Alla; Misgav, Haggai; Price, Jonathan; Roll, Israel; Yardeni, Ada, eds. (2011). Corpus Inscriptionum Iudaeae/Palaestinae: Volume 1/Part 1 Jerusalem: 1–704. Berlin: De Gruyter. doi:10.1515/9783110222203. ISBN 978-3-11-174100-0.
- Daschke, Dereck (2010). City of Ruins: Mourning the Destruction of Jerusalem Through Jewish Apocalypse. Biblical Interpretation Series. Vol. 99. Leiden: Brill. ISBN 978-9-004-18181-6.
- Davies, Gwyn (2023). "Stamping Out the Embers: Roman "Mopping-Up" Operations at the End of the First Jewish Revolt". In Mizzi, Dennis; Grey, Matthew; Rassalle, Tine (eds.). Pushing Sacred Boundaries in Early Judaism and the Ancient Mediterranean. Supplements to the Journal for the Study of Judaism. Vol. 208. Brill. pp. 100–127. doi:10.1163/9789004540828_005. ISBN 978-9-004-54082-8.
- Demsky, Aaron (1986). "When the Priests Trumpeted the Onset of the Sabbath". Biblical Archaeology Review. 12 (6): 50–52. ISSN 0098-9444.
- DeSilva, David A. (2024). Judea under Greek and Roman Rule. Oxford: Oxford University Press. ISBN 978-0-190-26328-7.
- Abu El-Haj, Nadia (2001). Facts on the Ground: Archaeological Practice and Territorial Self-Fashioning in Israeli Society. University of Chicago Press. pp. 206–209. ISBN 978-0-226-00194-4.
- Fine, Steven; Wisse, Jacob; Joshowitz, Jill (2021). "Exhibition Script and Object Checklist". In Fine, Steven (ed.). The Arch of Titus: From Jerusalem to Rome—and Back. Berlin/Boston. pp. 179–193. doi:10.1163/9789004447790_016. ISBN 978-9-004-44779-0.
- Fine, Steven (2023). "Why Was Titus Killed by a Gnat? Reflections on a Rabbinic Legend". In Eleff, Zev; Seidler-Feller, Shaul (eds.). Emet le-Ya'akov: Facing the Truths of History: Essays in Honor of Jacob J. Schacter. De Gruyter. pp. 544–568. doi:10.1515/9798887193137-028.
- Friedman, Mark (1996). "Jewish Pilgrimage after the Destruction of the Second Temple". In Rosovsky, Nitza (ed.). City of the Great King: Jerusalem from David to the Present. Cambridge, MA: Harvard University Press. pp. 136–147. ISBN 978-0-674-36708-1.
- Gabba, Emilio (1999). "The social, economic and political history of Palestine 63 BCE–CE 70". In Horbury, William; Davies, W. D.; Sturdy, John (eds.). The Early Roman Period. The Cambridge History of Judaism. Vol. 3. Cambridge, UK: Cambridge University Press. pp. 94–167. ISBN 978-1-139-05366-2.
- Gambash, Gil (2023). "Genocidal Perspectives in the Roman Empire's Approach towards the Jews". In Lemos, T. M.; Taylor, Tristan S.; Kiernan, Ben (eds.). The Cambridge World History of Genocide. Cambridge, UK: Cambridge University Press. pp. 330–352. doi:10.1017/9781108655989.015. ISBN 9781108655989.
- Geva, Hillel (2010). "Stratigraphy and Architecture". In Geva, Hillel (ed.). Jewish Quarter Excavations in the Old City of Jerusalem Conducted by Nahman Avigad, 1969–1982, Vol. IV. The Burnt House of Area B and Other Studies, Final Report. Jerusalem: Israel Exploration Society. pp. 1–90.
- Gerber, Jane S. (2021). "The Jews of Muslim Spain". In Lieberman, Phillip I. (ed.). Jews in the Medieval Islamic World. The Cambridge History of Judaism. Vol. 5. Cambridge, UK: Cambridge University Press. pp. 164–198. doi:10.1017/9781139048873. ISBN 978-1-139-04887-3.
- Goldenberg, Robert (2006). "The destruction of the Jerusalem Temple: its meaning and its consequences". In Katz, Steven T. (ed.). The Late Roman-Rabbinic Period. The Cambridge History of Judaism. Vol. 4. Cambridge, UK: Cambridge University Press. pp. 194–195. doi:10.1017/chol9780521772488.009. ISBN 978-0-521-77248-8.
- Goodblatt, David (2006). "The political and social history of the Jewish community in the Land of Israel". In Davies, William David; Finkelstein, Louis; Katz, Steven T. (eds.). The Late Roman-Rabbinic Period. The Cambridge History of Judaism. Vol. 4. Cambridge, UK: Cambridge University Press. pp. 404–430. ISBN 978-0-521-77248-8.
- Goodman, Martin (1987). The Ruling Class of Judaea: The Origins of the Jewish Revolt against Rome, A.D. 66–70. Cambridge, UK: Cambridge University Press. doi:10.1017/CBO9780511552656. ISBN 978-0-511-55265-6.
- Goodman, Martin (2004). "Trajan and the Origins of Roman Hostility to the Jews". Past & Present (182): 3–29. doi:10.1093/past/182.1.3. JSTOR 3600803.
- Grabbe, Lester L. (2021). A History of the Jews and Judaism in the Second Temple Period, Volume 4: The Jews under the Roman Shadow (4 BCE–150 CE). The Library of Second Temple Studies. London/New York: T&T Clark. ISBN 978-0-567-70070-4.
- Groves, Beatrice (2015). The Destruction of Jerusalem in Early Modern English Literature. Cambridge, UK: Cambridge University Press. ISBN 978-1-107-11327-5.
- Gruen, Erich S. (2002). "Diaspora and Homeland". In Wettstein, Howard (ed.). Diasporas and Exiles: Varieties of Jewish Identity. Berkeley, CA: University of California Press. pp. 18–46. ISBN 978-0-520-22864-1.
- Hengel, Martin (1989). The Zealots: Investigation into the Jewish Freedom Movement in the Period from Herod until 70 AD. Translated by Smith, David (2nd (Translated from German) ed.). Edinburgh: T&T Clark. ISBN 0-567-09372-7.
- Horowitz, Wayne (July 1996). "Halley's Comet and Judaean Revolts Revisited". The Catholic Biblical Quarterly. 58 (3). Catholic Biblical Association: 456–459. ISSN 0008-7912. JSTOR 43722716.
- Huitink, Luuk (2024). "Between Triumph and Tragedy: Josephus, Bellum Judaicum 7.121–157". In de Jong, Irene J. F.; Versluys, Miguel John (eds.). Reading Greek and Hellenistic-Roman Spolia: Objects, Appropriation and Cultural Change. Leiden: Brill. pp. 215–237. ISBN 978-9-004-68269-6.
- Isaac, Benjamin (2024). "Monotheism and Religious Wars in Antiquity". In Czajkowski, Kimberley; Friedman, David A. (eds.). Looking In, Looking Out: Jews and Non-Jews in Mutual Contemplation. Supplements to the Journal for the Study of Judaism. Vol. 212. Leiden and Boston: Brill. pp. 225–240. doi:10.1163/9789004685055_014. ISBN 978-9-004-68503-1.
- Jones, Ken (20 September 2011). Jewish Reactions to the Destruction of Jerusalem in A.D. 70: Apocalypses and Related Pseudepigrapha. Supplements to the Journal for the Study of Judaism. Vol. 151. Leiden: Brill. ISBN 978-90-04-21027-1.
- Kelley, Shawn J. (2022). "Genocide in Antiquity". In Brown, Sara E.; Smith, Stephen D. (eds.). The Routledge Handbook of Religion, Mass Atrocity and Genocide. London/New York: Routledge.
- Kessler, Edward (2010). An Introduction to Jewish-Christian Relations. Cambridge, UK: Cambridge University Press. doi:10.1017/CBO9780511801068. ISBN 978-0-511-80106-8. Archived from the original on 20 December 2024.
- Kirschner, Robert (1985). "Apocalyptic and Rabbinic Responses to the Destruction of 70". The Harvard Theological Review. 78 (1/2): 27–46. doi:10.1017/S0017816000027371. ISSN 0017-8160. JSTOR 1509592.
- Knight, W. (1896). The Arch of Titus and the Spoils of the Temple (2nd ed.). London: Religious Tract Society. pp. 9–10.
- Künzl, Ernst (1988). Der römische Triumph: Siegesfeiern im antiken Rom (in German). Munich: Beck. ISBN 978-3-406-32899-2.
- Landsberger, Franz (1941). "The Jewish Artist Before the Time of Emancipation". Hebrew Union College Annual. 16. Hebrew Union College Press: 321–414. ISSN 0360-9049. JSTOR 23503002.
- Leaney, Alfred Robert Clare (1984). The Jewish and Christian World 200 BC to AD 200. Cambridge: Cambridge University Press. doi:10.1017/CBO9780511621369. ISBN 978-0-511-62136-9.
- Leone, Francesco (2017). "A "Part" for the "Whole": Reality and Myth of the Menorah from Antiquity to the Present" (PDF). La Menorà: Culto, storia e mito, catalogo della mostra (Braccio di Carlo Magno in Vaticano–Museo Ebraico di Roma. Skira: 30–60.
- Levine, David (2018). "70 CE or 135 CE – Where was the Watershed? Ancient and Modern Perspectives". In Schwartz, Joshua J.; Tomson, Peter J. (eds.). Jews and Christians in the First and Second Centuries: The Interbellum 70‒132 CE. Compendia Rerum Iudaicarum ad Novum Testamentum. Vol. 15. Brill. pp. 161–175. doi:10.1163/9789004352971_011. ISBN 978-90-04-35297-1.
- Levine, Israel L. (1984). "Historical Context: The Land of Israel as Part of the Roman Empire and the Great Revolt" פני התקופה: ארץ-ישראל כחלק מן האימפריה הרומית והמרד הגדול. In Stern, Menahem (ed.). The Roman Byzantine Period: The Roman Period from the Conquest to the Ben Kozba War (63 BCE – 135 CE). The History of Eretz Israel (in Hebrew). Vol. 4. Ben-Zvi Institute. pp. 283–370.
- Levine, Lee I. (2005). The Ancient Synagogue: The First Thousand Years (2nd ed.). New Haven & London: Yale University Press. ISBN 0-300-10628-9.
- Levine, Lee I. (2008). "Jerusalem in Jewish history, tradition, and memory". In Mayer, Tamar; Mourad, Suleiman A. (eds.). Jerusalem: Idea and Reality. London: Routledge. pp. 27–47. doi:10.4324/9780203929773. ISBN 978-0-203-92977-3.
- Lieu, Judith (2006). "Self-definition vis-à-vis the Jewish matrix". In Mitchell, Margaret M.; Young, Frances M. (eds.). Origins to Constantine. The Cambridge History of Christianity. Vol. 1. Cambridge University Press. pp. 214–229. ISBN 978-1-139-05483-6.
- Lopez, Doron (2021). יהודה השבויה: רומא והיהודים לאחר החורבן [Captive Judea: Rome and the Jews after the Destruction of the Temple] (in Hebrew). Jerusalem: Zalman Shazar Center. ISBN 978-9-652-27376-5.
- Magness, Jodi (2012). The Archaeology of the Holy Land: From the Destruction of Solomon's Temple to the Muslim Conquest. Cambridge, UK: Cambridge University Press. ISBN 978-1-139-01383-3.
- Magness, Jodi (2024). Jerusalem Through The Ages: From Its Beginnings To The Crusades. New York: Oxford University Press. ISBN 978-0-19-093780-5.
- Marx, Doron (2013). "The Missing Temple: The Status of the Temple in Jewish Culture Following Its Destruction". European Judaism. 46 (2): 61–78. doi:10.3167/ej.2013.46.02.06. ISSN 0014-3006.
- Mason, Steve (2011). "What is History? Using Josephus for the Judaean-Roman War". In Popović, Mladen (ed.). The Jewish Revolt against Rome: Interdisciplinary Perspectives. Brill. pp. 155–240. doi:10.1163/9789004216693_017. ISBN 978-9-004-21668-6.
- Mason, Steve (2016). A History of the Jewish War: AD 66–74. Key Conflicts of Classical Antiquity. Cambridge University Press. doi:10.1017/CBO9781139020718. ISBN 978-1-139-02071-8.
- McKitterick, Rosamond; Ward, Graeme (2018). "Knowledge of the History of the Jews in the Early Middle Ages". Barbarian and Jews: Jews and Judaism in the Early Medieval West. Turnhout: Brepols Publishers. pp. 231–256. doi:10.1484/M.DIASPORA-EB.5.116413. ISBN 978-2-503-58101-9.
- Mendels, Doron (1992). The Rise and Fall of Jewish Nationalism: Jewish and Christian Ethnicity in Ancient Palestine. Anchor Bible Reference Library. New York: Doubleday. ISBN 978-0-385-26126-5.
- Meyers, Eric M.; Chancey, Mark A. (2012). Alexander to Constantine: Archaeology of the Land of the Bible, Volume III. The Anchor Yale Bible Reference Library. New Haven, CT: Yale University Press. ISBN 978-0-300-14179-5.
- Millar, Bonnie (1999). "The Role of Prophecy in the Siege of Jerusalem and its Analogues". The Yearbook of Langland Studies. 13: 153–178. doi:10.1484/J.YLS.2.302692. ISSN 0890-2917.
- Millar, Fergus (1995). The Roman Near East: 31 BC–AD 337. Harvard University Press. ISBN 978-0-674-77886-3.
- Millar, Fergus (2005). "Last Year in Jerusalem: Monuments of the Jewish War in Rome". In Edmondson, Jonathan; Mason, Steve; Rives, James (eds.). Flavius Josephus and Flavian Rome. Vol. 3. Oxford University Press. pp. 101–128. doi:10.1093/acprof:oso/9780199262120.003.0006. ISBN 978-0-199-26212-0.
- Millar, Fergus (2010). "Jerome and Palestine". Scripta Classica Israelica. 29: 59–79. doi:10.71043/sci.v29i.3155. ISSN 0334-4509.
- Mitchell, Margaret (2006). "Gentile Christianity". In Mitchell, Margaret M.; Young, Frances M. (eds.). Origins to Constantine. The Cambridge History of Christianity. Vol. 1. Cambridge, UK: Cambridge University Press. pp. 103–124. ISBN 978-1-139-05483-6.
- Moormann, E. M. (2023). "Judaea at the Tiber: Sacred objects from Judaea and their new function in Imperial Rome". In Troelenberg, Eva-Maria; Despoina, Tsiafakis (eds.). Reading Greek and Hellenistic-Roman Spolia. Vol. 5. Leiden: Brill. pp. 238–262. doi:10.1163/9789004682702_014. ISBN 978-90-04-68269-6.
- Overman, J. Andrew (2002). "The First Revolt and Flavian politics". In Berlin, Andrea M.; Overman, J. Andrew (eds.). The First Jewish Revolt: Archaeology, History, and Ideology. London/New York: Routledge. pp. 213–221. ISBN 978-0-415-62024-6.
- Paget, James Carleton (2018). "Jewish Revolts and Jewish-Christian Relations". In Schwartz, Joshua J.; Tomson, Peter J. (eds.). Jews and Christians in the First and Second Centuries: The Interbellum 70‒132 CE. Compendia Rerum Iudaicarum ad Novum Testamentum. Vol. 15. Leiden: Brill. pp. 276–306. doi:10.1163/9789004352971_011. ISBN 978-90-04-35297-1.
- Parente, Fausto (2005). "The Impotence of Titus, or Josephus' Bellum Judaicum as an example of 'pathetic' historiography". In Sievers, Joseph; Lembi, Gaia (eds.). Josephus and Jewish History in Flavian Rome and Beyond. Supplements to the Journal for the Study of Judaism. Vol. 104. Leiden: Brill. pp. 45–69. ISBN 978-9-047-41552-7.
- Patrich, Joseph (2024). The Jerusalem Temple and the Temple Mount: Collected Essays. Wissenschaftliche Untersuchungen zum Neuen Testament. Vol. 514. Tübingen: Mohr Siebeck. ISBN 978-3-16-163269-3.
- Peleg-Barkat, Orit (2019). Mourad, Suleiman A.; Koltun-Fromm, Naomi; Der Matossian, Bedross (eds.). Herodian Jerusalem. London/New York: Routledge. pp. 34–46. ISBN 978-1-138-93693-5.
- Price, Jonathan J. (1992). Jerusalem under Siege: The Collapse of the Jewish State 66-70 C.E. Brill's Series in Jewish Studies. Vol. 3. Leiden, New York and Köln: Brill. ISBN 978-9-004-09471-0.
- Price, Jonathan (2011). "The Jewish Population of Jerusalem from the First Century BCE to the Early Second Century CE: The Epigraphic Record". In Popović, Mladen (ed.). The Jewish Revolt against Rome: Interdisciplinary Perspectives. Leiden: Brill. pp. 399–418. doi:10.1163/9789004216693_017. ISBN 978-9-004-21668-6.
- Price, Jonathan (2024). "Historiography in the Time of Stasis: Reflections on the Nationalistic Uprisings in Judea/Palestine". In Czajkowski, Kimberley; Friedman, David A. (eds.). Looking In, Looking Out: Jews and Non-Jews in Mutual Contemplation. Supplements to the Journal for the Study of Judaism. Vol. 212. Leiden and Boston: Brill. pp. 15–37. doi:10.1163/9789004685055_003. ISBN 978-9-004-68503-1.
- Rand, Michael (2007). "Observations on the Relationship Between JPA Poetry and the Hebrew Piyyut Tradition: The Case of the Kinot". In Gerhards, Albert; Leonhard, Clemens (eds.). Jewish and Christian Liturgy and Worship: New Insights into Its History and Interaction. Jewish and Christian Perspectives Series. Vol. 15. Leiden: Brill. pp. 127–144.
- Reich, Ronny; Billig, Yakov (2008). "Jerusalem, The Robinson's Arch Area". The New Encyclopedia of Archaeological Excavations in the Holy Land. 5: 1809–1811.
- Reich, Ronny (2009). חורבן ירושלים בשנת 70 לסה"נ: תיאורו של יוסף בן מתתיהו והממצא הארכאולוגי [The Sack of Jerusalem in 70 CE: Flavius Josephus' Description and the Archaeological Record]. Cathedra: For the History of Eretz Israel and Its Yishuv (in Hebrew) (131): 25–42. ISSN 0334-4657. JSTOR 23407359.
- Reich, Ronny; Shukron, Eli (2011). "The Pool of Siloam in Jerusalem of the Late Second Temple Period and Its Surroundings". In Galor, K.; Avni, G. (eds.). Unearthing Jerusalem: 150 Years of Archaeological Research in the Holy City. Winona Lake, IN: Eisenbrauns. pp. 241–255. doi:10.1515/9781575066592-015.
- Reich, Ronny (2015). "בניינה וחורבנה של קשת רובינסון בהר הבית שבירושלים" [The Construction and Destruction of Robinson's Arch]. Eretz-Israel: Archaeological, Historical and Geographical Studies / ארץ-ישראל: מחקרים בידיעת הארץ ועתיקותיה (in Hebrew). 31. Israel Exploration Society: 398–407. JSTOR 24433079.
- Reich, Ronny; Shukron, Eli (2019). "The Second Temple Period Siloam Pool". In Geva, H. (ed.). Ancient Jerusalem Revealed: Archaeological Discoveries, 1998–2018. Jerusalem: Israel Exploration Society. pp. 73–83.
- Reich, Ronny; Baruch, Yuval (2020). "A Note on the Date of the Stone Collapse at the Western Wall of the Temple Mount". Israel Exploration Journal. 70 (1): 99–105. ISSN 0021-2059. JSTOR 27100278.
- Renton, James (2007). The Zionist Masquerade: The Birth of the Anglo-Zionist Alliance, 1914–1918. London: Palgrave Macmillan. ISBN 978-0-230-54718-6.
- Rives, James (2005). "Flavian Religious Policy and the Destruction of the Jerusalem Temple". In Edmondson, Jonathan; Mason, Steve; Rives, James (eds.). Flavius Josephus and Flavian Rome. Vol. 3. Oxford: Oxford University Press. pp. 145–166. doi:10.1093/acprof:oso/9780199262120.003.0008. ISBN 978-0-199-26212-0.
- Rocca, Samuele (2008). The Forts of Judaea 168 BC – AD 73. Oxford: Osprey. ISBN 978-1-84603-171-7.
- Rocca, Samuele (2022). In the Shadow of the Caesars: Jewish Life in Roman Italy. The Brill Reference Library of Judaism. Vol. 74. Leiden: Brill. ISBN 978-9-004-51704-2.
- Rogers, Guy MacLean (2022). For the Freedom of Zion: The Great Revolt of Jews against Romans, 66–74 CE. New Haven, CT: Yale University Press. ISBN 978-0-300-24813-5.
- Safrai, Samuel (1976). "The Era of the Mishnah and Talmud (70–640)". A History of the Jewish People. Cambridge, Massachusetts: Harvard University Press. pp. 307–382. ISBN 0-674-39731-2.
- Saldarini, Anthony J. (2002). "Good from evil: The rabbinic response". In Berlin, Andrea M.; Overman, J. Andrew (eds.). The First Jewish Revolt: Archaeology, History, and Ideology. London/New York: Routledge. pp. 221–233. ISBN 978-0-415-62024-6.
- Schäfer, Peter (2003). The History of the Jews in the Greco-Roman World: The Jews of Palestine from Alexander the Great to the Arab Conquest. Routledge. ISBN 978-0-415-30587-7.
- Schaper, Joachim (1999). "The Pharisees". In Horbury, William; Davies, W. D.; Sturdy, John (eds.). The Early Roman Period. The Cambridge History of Judaism. Vol. 3. Cambridge University Press. pp. 402–427. ISBN 978-1-139-05366-2.
- Schwartz, Seth (2006). "Political, social, and economic life in the Land of Israel, 66–c. 235". In Katz, Steven T. (ed.). The Late Roman-Rabbinic Period. The Cambridge History of Judaism. Vol. 4. Cambridge, UK: Cambridge University Press. pp. 23–52. ISBN 978-0-521-77248-8.
- Schwartz, Seth (2014b). The Ancient Jews from Alexander to Muhammad. Cambridge, UK: Cambridge University Press. ISBN 978-1-139-64947-6.
- Shimron, Aryeh; Peleg-Barkat, Orit (2010). "New Evidence of the Royal Stoa and Roman Flames". Biblical Archaeology Review. 36 (2): 57–62.
- Silberman, Neil Asher (2002). "The First Revolt and its afterlife". In Berlin, Andrea M.; Overman, J. Andrew (eds.). The First Jewish Revolt: Archaeology, History, and Ideology. London/New York: Routledge. pp. 237–252. ISBN 978-0-415-62024-6.
- Sivan, Hagith (2008). Palestine in Late Antiquity. Oxford University Press. ISBN 978-0-19-928417-7.
- Smallwood, E. Mary (1976). The Jews under Roman Rule from Pompey to Diocletian. London: SBL Press. ISBN 978-90-04-50204-8.
- Steinberg, Jessica (9 February 2023). "Award-winning animated feature about Second Temple destruction now in English". Times of Israel.
- Stern, Menahem (1976). "The Period of the Second Temple". A History of the Jewish People. Harvard University Press. pp. 185–303. ISBN 0-674-39731-2.
- Stern, Menahem (1980). Greek and Latin Authors on Jews and Judaism. Vol. 2. Jerusalem: Israel Academy of Sciences and Humanities. ISBN 9-652-08037-3.
- Stuckenbruck, Loren T.; Gurtner, Daniel M., eds. (2019). T&T Clark Encyclopedia of Second Temple Judaism. Vol. 2. London/New York: T&T Clark. ISBN 978-0-567-66144-9.
- Tropper, Amram (2016). Rewriting Ancient Jewish History: The History of the Jews in Roman Times and the New Historical Method. London & New York: Routledge. ISBN 978-1-138-64148-8.
- Von Falkenhausen, Vera (2012). "The Jews In Byzantine Southern Italy". In Bonfil, Robert; Irshai, Oded; Stroumsa, Guy G.; Talgam, Rina (eds.). Jews in Byzantium: Dialectics of Minority and Majority Cultures. Jerusalem Studies in Religion and Culture. Vol. 14. Brill. pp. 271–296. doi:10.1163/ej.9789004203556.i-1010.36. ISBN 978-9-004-20355-6.
- Van Kooten, George H. (2011). "The Jewish War and the Roman Civil War of 68–69 CE: Jewish, Pagan, and Christian Perspectives". In Popović, Mladen (ed.). The Jewish Revolt against Rome: Interdisciplinary Perspectives. Leiden: Brill. pp. 419–450. doi:10.1163/9789004216693_018. ISBN 978-9-004-21668-6.
- Vette, Nathanael (December 2023). "The Omens at Jesus's Death (Mark 15:33–39) and the Divine Abandonment of the Temple before Its Destruction in 70 CE". Journal of Biblical Literature. 142 (4): 657–675. doi:10.15699/jbl.1424.2023.6. hdl:20.500.11820/7a6849bb-bcc8-41b2-a47e-e4c72cfeb60b. ISSN 0021-9231.
- Weksler-Bdolah, Shlomit (2019). Aelia Capitolina – Jerusalem in the Roman Period: In Light of Archaeological Research. Mnemosyne, Supplements, History and Archaeology of Classical Antiquity. Vol. 432. Brill. ISBN 978-9-004-40733-6.
- Wilker, Julia (2012). ""God is with Italy now" Pro-Roman Jews and the Jewish Revolt". In Eckhardt, Benedikt (ed.). Jewish Identity and Politics between the Maccabees and Bar Kokhba Groups, Normativity, and Rituals. Supplements to the Journal for the Study of Judaism. Vol. 155. Leiden: Brill. pp. 157–187. doi:10.1163/9789004218512_010. ISBN 978-9-004-21046-2.
- Yavetz, Zvi (1975). "Reflections on Titus and Josephus". Greek, Roman, and Byzantine Studies. 16 (4): 411–432. ISSN 2159-3159.
- Zissos, Andrew (2016). "The Emperor Titus". In Zissos, Andrew (ed.). A Companion to the Flavian Age of Imperial Rome. Chichester: Wiley. pp. 487–517. doi:10.1002/9781118878149.ch4. ISBN 978-1-444-33600-9.
