= Zealot coup in Jerusalem =

Siege of the Temple in Jerusalem during the First Jewish–Roman War (66–70 AD)

- Part of the First Jewish–Roman War
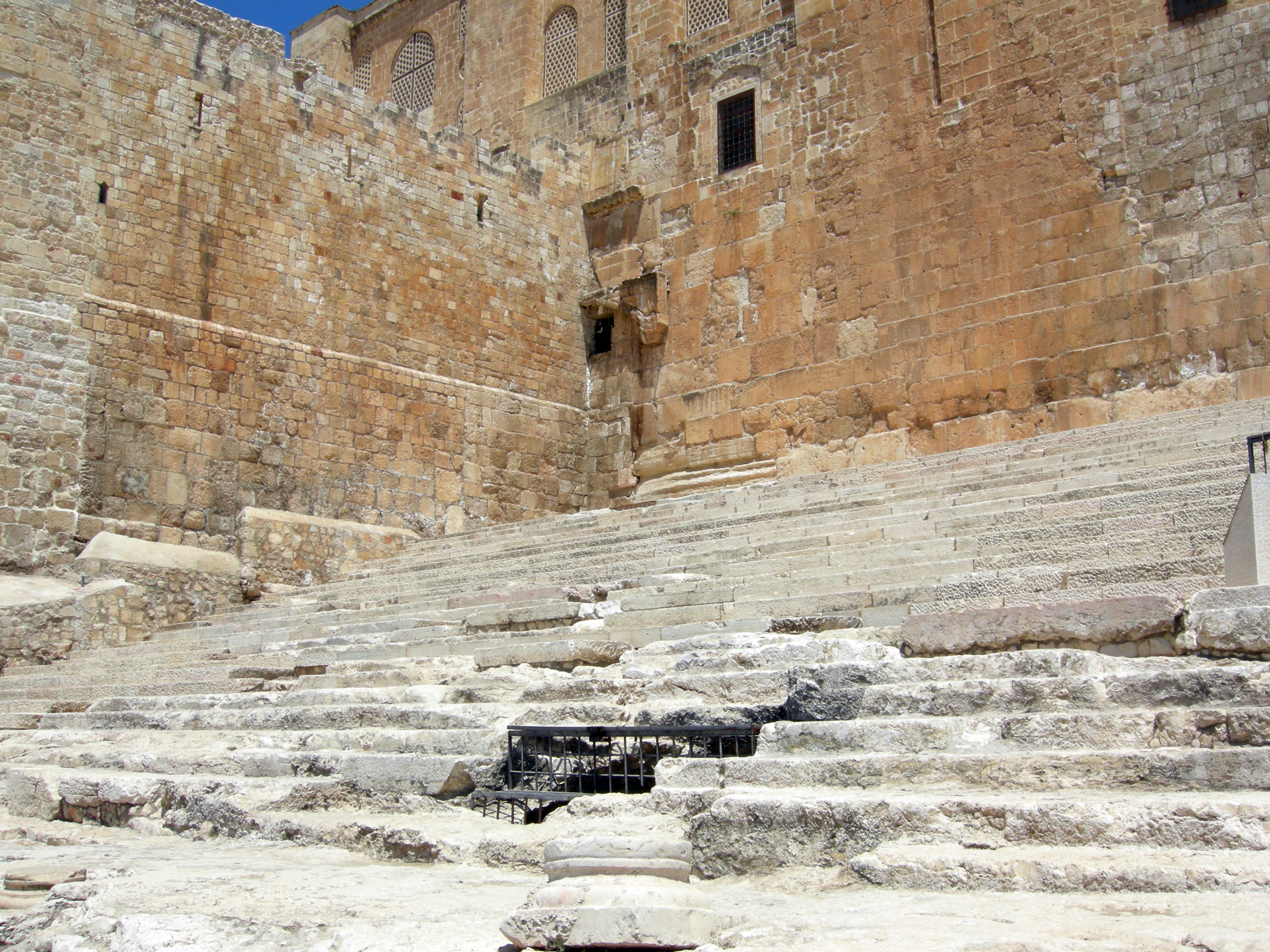
- Excavated remains of staircase from the Temple in Jerusalem
Date	Winter of 67/68 AD
Location	Jerusalem, Judaea
Result	Zealot victory: Moderate government overthrown; Execution of moderate leaders

Belligerents
Zealots Idumeans Galileans	Judean provisional government

Commanders and leaders
Eleazar ben Simon John; Jacob ben Sosa; Simon ben Cathlas; Phineas ben Clusothus John of Giscala	Ananus ben Ananus †; Joseph ben Gurion †

Strength
2000 to 4000 zealots 20,000 Edomite (Idumeans) men	6,000 men (temple guards and loyalists recruits)

Casualties and losses
Unknown	6,000, plus mass civilian casualties

The Zealot coup in Jerusalem was a violent seizure of power in 66–68 CE, in which the Zealots, a radical Jewish faction, overthrew the moderate government established at the outset of the First Jewish–Roman War (66–73 CE). The coup marked a turning point in the growing internal conflict among Jewish factions resisting Roman rule. The zealot coup took place as Vespasian's forces were concluding their Galilee campaign, while Jerusalem faced mounting instability due to an influx of refugees and rebel fighters.

Led by Eleazar ben Simon, the Zealots executed prominent figures accused of collaboration with the Romans, seized the Temple precinct, and replaced the traditional high priesthood with Phannias ben Samuel, chosen by lot. Moderate leader Ananus ben Ananus gained popular support and began raising an army to challenge the Zealots. In response, the Zealots launched a counteroffensive, but were outnumbered and forced to retreat and fortify themselves in the Temple. Urged by John of Gischala, they summoned the Idumeans, who entered the city under the cover of a storm and aided in the massacre of the moderates.

Following their victory, the Zealots and Idumeans established tribunals, killed their opponents—including Ananus, Joshua ben Gamla, and Niger the Perean—and solidified control through terror and purges. Many Idumeans later withdrew, while some joined the faction of Simon bar Giora. The internal violence led many to flee the city, and according to Josephus, convinced Vespasian to delay his assault on the city, believing the Jews were destroying themselves without Roman intervention.

== Background ==
The Zealot coup took place against the backdrop of the First Jewish–Roman War (66–73 CE), which began with mounting tensions between Jews and Greeks in Caesarea Maritima, and was inflamed by the actions of Roman prefect Gessius Florus, whose seizure of Temple funds sparked riots and mass violence in Jerusalem. After Florus fled the city and King Agrippa II failed to calm the unrest, Eleazar ben Hananiah, a temple official, ceased the traditional sacrifices offered on behalf of the emperor—an open rejection of Roman authority. Soon after, Jewish rebels seized key strongholds in Jerusalem, burned official buildings, and killed the Roman garrison. The Sicarii, a radical group of Jewish assassins, executed the high priest and his brother, but after their leader was killed, they fled to Masada.

In response, Cestius Gallus, the Roman governor of Syria, marched on Jerusalem but, after initial successes, unexpectedly retreated. His withdrawal ended in disaster at Bethoron. After Gallus' defeat, a popular assembly convened at the Temple in Jerusalem and established a provisional government. Leadership was assumed by Ananus ben Ananus, a Sadducee and former High Priest, who shared power with the noble Pharisee Joseph ben Gurion. However, unity among the rebels proved elusive, as John of Gischala and Simon bar Giora led independent factions in Galilee and Judea, respectively, operating outside the authority of the central leadership.

In 67 CE, the Roman general Vespasian was appointed by Emperor Nero to crush the rebellion. Upon arriving in Judaea, Vespasian launched a systematic campaign through Galilee, capturing towns and driving many rebels and civilians to seek refuge in Jerusalem. The influx of refugees and armed groups turned the city into a powder keg of political instability and factional conflict. Among those arriving was John of Gischala, who likely reached Jerusalem in autumn 67 CE. According to Josephus, John of Gischala, who secretly aspired to rule Jerusalem, had cultivated a friendship with Ananus, though he betrayed him by revealing his secrets to the Zealots:

[John of Giscala] was a man of great craft, and bore about him in his soul a strong passion after tyranny, and . . . he pretended to be of the people's opinion, and went all about with Ananus when he consulted the great men every day, and in the night time also when he went round the watch; but he divulged their secrets to the zealots, and every thing that the people deliberated about was by his means known to their enemies, even before it had been well agreed upon by themselves.

Opposing the moderate government, the Zealots gained control of the Temple, carried out purges of suspected collaborators. They also broke with tradition by appointing the high priest through a lottery, selecting Phannias ben Samuel from a remote village with no priestly lineage or knowledge of the role. These developments set the stage for the violent power struggle that would soon culminate in the Zealot coup.

== Siege ==
According to Josephus, Ananus ben Ananus delivered a speech at a public assembly in Jerusalem, condemning the population for tolerating the rise of the Zealots, whom he called "tyrants." He rebuked the people for remaining silent when the city's nobles were murdered without trial and warned that the rebels had turned the Temple—the most sacred place—into a fortress. Evoking past struggles against foreign domination, Ananus questioned why those who had fought for liberty now submitted to homegrown oppression. He contrasted the restraint of the Romans, who had not violated the sanctuary, with the bloodstained rebels who roamed freely within it. Urging the people to rise up, he called on them to fight not just for family, but for God and the sanctity of the Temple. The speech stirred the crowd, who demanded that he lead them against the Zealots.

As Ananus began mobilizing fighters, the Zealots, realizing the threat, launched a furious counterattack from within the Temple. The skirmish began with the belligerents throwing rocks at one another, then javelins, then finally hand-to-hand combat with swords ensued. Eventually the Zealots retreated to the inner court of the Temple, and The moderates' superior numbers eventually forced the Zealots to retreat into the inner court of the Temple, where they fortified themselves. 6,000 men of Ananus's men were appointed to guard the Temple’s surrounding porticoes, blockading the Zealots inside the sanctuary.

John was suspected of being a spy, and so was made to swear an "oath of goodwill" to Ananus ben Ananus and the people. After swearing the oath, Ananus sent John of Giscala into the inner court, to speak with the Zealots on his behalf. John immediately turned coat, "as if his oath had been made to the zealots," telling them that they were in imminent danger, and could not survive a siege. He told them that they had two options: 1) to surrender, in which case they'd either face execution, vigilantism, or retribution for the "desperate things they had done"; or 2) to ask for outside assistance. John told the Zealots that Ananus had sent ambassadors to Vespasian to ask him to come take the city. This in fact was not true, but convinced them that they could not endure a siege without help.

In response, the Zealots summoned upon the Idumeans, a group residing in southern Judea, who were converted to Judaism by Hasmonean leader John Hyrcanus after their conquest in the 2nd century BCE. According to Josephus:

[The Zealots] hesitated a great while what they should do, considering the shortness of the time by which they were straitened; because the people were prepared to attack them very soon, and because the suddenness of the plot laid against them had almost cut off all their hopes of getting any foreign assistance; for they might be under the height of their afflictions before any of their confederates could be informed of it. However, it was resolved to call in the Idumeans [Edomites]; so they wrote a short letter to this effect: That Ananus had imposed on the people, and was betraying their metropolis to the Romans; that they themselves had revolted from the rest, and were in custody in the temple, on account of the preservation of their liberty; that there was but a small time left wherein they might hope for their deliverance; and that unless they would come immediately to their assistance, they should themselves be soon in the power of Ananus, and the city would be in the power of the Romans.

The messengers managed to sneak out of the Temple and successfully deliver their message to the rulers of the Edomites, who were greatly alarmed, and quickly raised an army of 20,000 to march on Jerusalem, "in order to maintain the liberty of their metropolis." Upon receiving word that 20,000 Edomites were marching on Jerusalem, ben Hanan ordered the gates shut against them, and the walls guarded. Jesus, one of the elder high priests, made a speech from the walls, denouncing the Zealots as robbers and telling the Edomites to throw down their arms. Simon, son of Cathlas, one of Idumean commanders, quieted the tumult of his own men and answered: "I can no longer wonder that the patrons of liberty are under custody in the temple, since there are those that shut the gates of our common city to their own nation, and at the same time are prepared to admit the Romans into it; nay, perhaps are disposed to crown the gates with garlands at their coming, while they speak to the Idumeans from their own towers, and enjoin them to throw down their arms which they have taken up for the preservation of its liberty. . . ."

That night a thunderstorm blew over Jerusalem, and the Zealots sneaked from the Temple to the gates, and cut the bars of the gates with saws, the sound masked by the sound of the wind and thunder. They opened the gates of Jerusalem to the Edomites, who fell upon the guards and made their way to the Temple. The two factions then launched a brutal assault on the city's defenders, many of whom were killed in their sleep or overwhelmed by the superior numbers of the attackers. The Idumeans, showing no mercy, slaughtered both defenders and supplicants. They slaughtered Ananus' forces there, killing him as well. After freeing the Zealots from the Temple, they massacred the common people. Eventually, after learning that Vespasian had never been contacted by Ananus ben Ananus, the Edomites repented and left the city.

During the winter of 67/68 CE, the rebel factions ruthlessly eliminated their enemies and solidified their power through slaughter, terror, and public trials. Ananus ben Ananus and Joshua ben Gamla were captured, killed, and dishonored, their bodies left unburied in violation of Jewish custom. The distinguished commander Niger the Perean and the moderate leader Joseph ben Gurion were also murdered. The Zealots established special tribunals to prosecute those accused of treason.

== Aftermath ==
Most of the Idumaeans, realizing the extent of their wrongs, eventually chose to leave Jerusalem; others stayed and joined Simon's ranks. Many Jews fled to the Romans, driven either by personal danger from their ties to the former government or by disillusionment with the revolutionary leaders; others secured their departure by paying a price. Vespasian, upon hearing of the events in Jerusalem from deserters, decided against marching on the city, asserting, according to Josephus, that God was letting the Jews destroy themselves without Roman interference.

Jerusalem remained in the hands of the Zealots until the Siege of Jerusalem (70 AD) by Roman legions under Titus resulted in the destruction of the city and the capture and imprisonment of the rebel leaders.

== See also ==
- Josephus

== Bibliography ==
=== Sources ===
- Gabba, Emilio (1999). "The social, economic and political history of Palestine 63 BCE–CE 70". In Horbury, William; Davies, W. D.; Sturdy, John (eds.). The Early Roman Period. The Cambridge History of Judaism. Vol. 3. Cambridge University Press. pp. 94–167. ISBN 9781139053662.
- Price, Jonathan J. (1992). Jerusalem under Siege: The Collapse of the Jewish State 66-70 C.E. Brill's Series in Jewish Studies. Vol. 3. Leiden, New York and Köln: Brill. ISBN 978-9-004-09471-0.
- Rogers, Guy MacLean (2022). For the Freedom of Zion: The Great Revolt of Jews against Romans, 66–74 CE. Yale University Press. ISBN 978-0-300-24813-5.
