= Battle of Beth Horon (66) =

Battle between Judean rebels and the Syrian Legion of the Roman Empire

- Part of the First Jewish–Roman War
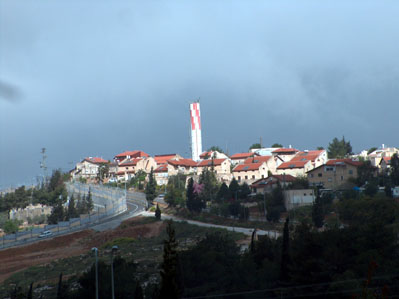
- Beit Horon
Date	66 CE
Location	Bethoron 31°52′38″N 35°7′7″E
Result	Judean victory

Belligerents
Roman Empire	Jews of Judaea Province

Commanders and leaders
Cestius Gallus	Simon bar Giora; Eleazar ben Simon; Joshua ben Zafia; Niger the Perean

Units involved
Legio XII Fulminata; Vexilations from III Gallica, IIII Scythica and VI Ferrata; Several cohorts of auxiliaries	Judean militias

Strength
20,000 troops	Tens of thousands

Casualties and losses
6,000 troops killed, XII Fulminata lost aquila	Unknown

The Battle of Beth Horon was a military engagement fought in 66 CE between the Roman army and Jewish rebels in the early phase of the First Jewish–Roman War. During the event, the Syrian Legion Legio XII Fulminata with auxiliary support headed by Legate of Syria Cestius Gallus was ambushed by a large force of Judean rebel infantry at the passage of Beth Horon, on their retreat from Jerusalem towards the coastal plain. The rebel Judean forces headed by Simon Bar Giora, Eleazar ben Simon and other rebel generals succeeded in inflicting a humiliating defeat, killing some 6,000 Roman troops and capturing the Legion's aquila, with much of the Roman Army fleeing in disarray from the battle field. The defeat of the Roman Army had major implications in prolonging the rebellion, leading to the short-lived Judean self-governorship in Judea and Galilee.

== Background ==
In the spring of 66 CE, a series of events in Judaea ignited what would become the First Jewish–Roman War. The immediate catalyst was a land dispute in the mixed city of Caesarea, where the Roman authorities sided with the local Greek community against the local Jewish community. Shortly thereafter, Roman procurator Gessius Florus arrived in Jerusalem and seized 17 talents from the Temple treasury, claiming it was for "governmental purposes." His brutal suppression of protests—including mass killings, looting, crucifixions, and the taking of prisoners—sparked a popular uprising that led to his withdrawal from the city.

Efforts to restore order quickly collapsed. The pro-Roman Jewish ruler Herod Agrippa II attempted to calm the unrest, but his appeals were rejected and he was forced to flee the city. He then traveled to Antioch, where he informed Cestius Gallus, the Roman governor of Syria—who held responsibility for security across the region—of the unfolding developments. Meanwhile, Eleazar ben Hanania, a Temple official and son of a former High Priest, halted the daily sacrifices offered on behalf of the emperor, an act which according to Josephus, marked the beginning of the war. Around the same time, the radical Sicarii faction seized the desert fortress of Masada, killing the Roman garrison.

As the situation deteriorated, Jerusalem descended into civil strife. Fighting broke out between pro-Roman moderates and militant rebels, and the Upper City was captured by the insurgents. Roman positions across the city were overrun, and in mid-September, the final Roman garrisons surrendered under terms of safe passage, only to be killed shortly afterward. Violence quickly spread beyond Jerusalem. Massacres of Jews occurred in mixed cities, while Jewish forces raided nearby settlements and seized the fortresses of Cypros and Machaerus.

In response to the events in Judaea, Cestius began organizing a major campaign to restore Roman control. From Antioch, he assembled a large expeditionary force, anchored by Legio XII Fulminata, a unit with a history dating back to Caesar's Gallic Wars. To this core, he added 2,000-man vexillations (detachments) from the three other Syrian legions—Legio IV Scythica, Legio VI Ferrata, and Legio X Fretensis. Gallus also mobilized six auxiliary infantry cohorts and four cavalry alae, as well as thousands of allied troops (largely composed of archers and cavalry) from client kings including Antiochus IV of Commagene, Agrippa II, and Sohaemus of Emesa. Irregular forces from cities like Berytus, driven by anti-Jewish sentiment, were also recruited. In total, Cestius's army numbered between 29,000 and 36,000 troops, not including a significant support train of military slaves and logistical personnel.

== Prelude ==
By 19 August 66 at the latest, Gallus began marching his troops from Antioch to Akko-Ptolemais in Phoenicia (modern Acre, Israel). His forces moved swiftly through Galilee and along the coast, capturing and burning towns such as Chabulon and Jaffa. Upon reaching Lydda—largely deserted as most residents had gone to Jerusalem for the festival of Sukkot (around September–October)—his troops killed the few remaining inhabitants and razed the town. As the army advanced from the foothills into the Judaean Mountains, it was ambushed by Jewish forces and suffered heavy losses. In late Tishrei (September/October), Gallus finally reached Jerusalem, captured and burned parts of the city, but then lifted the siege and retreated for reasons that remain unclear. Modern historians suggest the withdrawal may have been due to strong resistance, poor logistics, lack of siege equipment, and doubts about the sincerity of local peace offers.

After abandoning the assault on Jerusalem, Gallus withdrew to his camp on Mount Scopus and the next day began a retreat from the city. Jewish forces pursued the Roman column, harassing its rear units and attacking from both sides with missiles. The Romans, likely under orders or wary of breaking formation, offered minimal resistance and suffered heavy casualties, including senior officers such as Priscus, commander of the Sixth Legion, a tribune named Longinus, and the cavalry leader Iucundus. The column then abandoned most of its baggage under pressure.

The Roman army then arrived in Gabaon (near modern Al-Jib). There, the troops rested for two days, but observing the growing strength of the rebel forces, Gallus ordered a further retreat. To speed the withdrawal and avoid enemy capture of supplies, he commanded the killing of all remaining pack animals except those needed to transport weapons and siege engines. The Roman force then continued its march towards the coastal plain.

== Battle ==
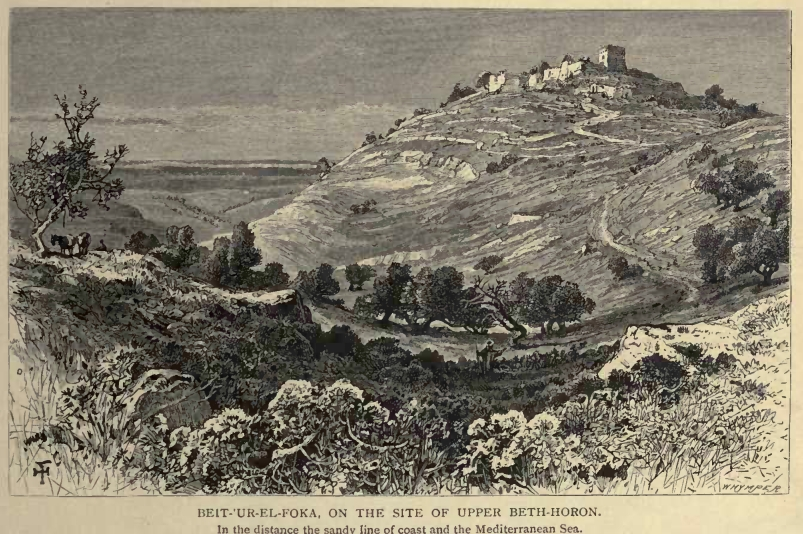
Upper Bet Horon, drawing from 1880

Upon arriving at the narrow Bethoron pass, Gallus's army was struck by an ambush, at the same route where the Maccabees had defeated a Seleucid army two centuries earlier. As the Romans entered the steep pass, Jewish warriors positioned on the surrounding cliffs unleashed a barrage of arrows and missiles. Those who escaped to the pass's foot did so under cover of darkness but lost hundreds of men in the process. Suetonius, possibly in error, mentions that the Romans lost their legionary eagle. The Romans suffered heavy losses, with 5,300 infantry—nearly an entire legion—killed, along with 480 cavalry, the equivalent of a full ala.

Scholars have compared the Roman failure to the disastrous Battle of the Teutoburg Forest in 9 CE, though the latter was much larger in scale, resulting in three times the losses. Fergus Millar writes that Gallus' defeat is particularly significant as a rare instance where Roman regular forces suffered a decisive defeat in a Roman province and at the hands of the local population.

== Aftermath ==
The rebels pursued the retreating Romans all the way to Antipatris, forcing them to abandon supplies, including artillery and battering rams, which, along with other spoils, were seized by the rebels. Soon after his return, Gallus died, possibly taking his own life (before the spring of 67 CE), and was succeeded in the governorship by Mucianus.

This major Roman defeat encouraged many more volunteers and towns in Judea to throw their lot in with the rebellion. The Judean victory led to the establishment of the Judean self-governorship in Judea and Galilee, with some of the figure heads of the battle taking leading roles in the governance. Battle leaders Eleazar ben Simon, Joshua ben Zafia and Niger the Perean were appointed regional governors across Judaea's territories. However, Simon bar Giora was evicted from Jerusalem due to fears by rebel government leaders of his dominance. This led Bar Giora to raise his own army in southern Judaea.

A full-scale war was then inevitable. The shock of the defeat convinced the Romans of the need to fully commit to crushing the rebellion regardless of the effort it would require. Emperor Nero and the senate then appointed Vespasian, the future Emperor, to bring the Roman army to Judea and crush the rebellion with a force of four Legions.

== Literature ==
In Manda Scott's historical novel, Rome: The Eagle of the Twelfth, the author describes the Battle of Beth Horon and the destruction of the XII legion.

== Bibliography ==
- Bilde, Per (1979). "The Causes of the Jewish War according to Josephus". Journal for the Study of Judaism in the Persian, Hellenistic, and Roman Period. 10 (2): 179–202. doi:10.1163/157006379X00048. JSTOR 24657020. Archived from the original on 23 December 2024.
- Davis, Paul K. (2001). 100 Decisive Battles. Oxford University Press. ISBN 1-57607-075-1.
- Gabba, Emilio (1999). "The social, economic and political history of Palestine 63 BCE–CE 70". In Horbury, William; Davies, W. D.; Sturdy, John (eds.). The Early Roman Period. The Cambridge History of Judaism. Vol. 3. Cambridge University Press. pp. 94–167. ISBN 9781139053662.
- Price, Jonathan J. (1992). Jerusalem under Siege: The Collapse of the Jewish State, 66-70 C.E. Brill's Series in Jewish Studies. Vol. 3. Brill. ISBN 978-9-004-09471-0.
- Mason, Steve (2016). A History of the Jewish War: AD 66–74. Key Conflicts of Classical Antiquity. Cambridge University Press. doi:10.1017/CBO9781139020718. ISBN 978-1-139-02071-8.
- Millar, Fergus (1995). The Roman Near East: 31 BC–AD 337. Harvard University Press. ISBN 978-0-674-77886-3. Archived from the original on 7 December 2024.
- Murison, Charles Leslie (2016). "The Emperor Titus". In Zissos, Andrew (ed.). A Companion to the Flavian Age of Imperial Rome. Wiley. pp. 76–91. doi:10.1002/9781118878149.ch4. ISBN 978-1-444-33600-9.
- Rogers, Guy MacLean (2022). For the Freedom of Zion: The Great Revolt of Jews against Romans, 66–74 CE. Yale University Press. ISBN 978-0-300-24813-5. Archived from the original on 7 December 2024.
- Smallwood, E. Mary (1976). The Jews under Roman Rule from Pompey to Diocletian. SBL Press. ISBN 978-90-04-50204-8. Archived from the original on 22 April 2024.
- Stern, Menachem (1976). "The Period of the Second Temple". A History of the Jewish People. Harvard University Press. pp. 185–303. ISBN 0-674-39731-2.
