= Joseph ben Gurion =

Jewish leader during the First Jewish–Roman War (66-70 CE)

Leader of Judean Provisional Government
- In office 66 – 68 AD
- Preceded by: Position established
- Succeeded by: Position abolished

Military service
- Battles/wars: First Jewish–Roman War

Joseph ben Gurion was according to Josephus one of the chief leaders of the First Jewish–Roman War, which erupted in the year 66 in Roman Judea. Along with Ananus ben Ananus, ben Gurion was heading the Judean provisional government (66–68), formed in the aftermath of the Battle of Beth Horon (66). Ben Gurion was killed in the year 68 during the carnage of the Zealot coup in Jerusalem.

== Great Revolt ==
Following the defeat of Gallus in Beth Horon, the People's Assembly was called under the political guidance of Simeon ben Gamliel and thus the Judean provisional government was formed in Jerusalem. Former High Priest Ananus ben Ananus (Hanan ben Hanan) was appointed one of the government heads and began reinforcing the city, with other prominent figure of Joseph ben Gurion, with Joshua ben Gamla taking a leading role. Josephus Matthias (Yosef ben Matityahu) was appointed the commander in Galilee and Golan, while Josephus Simon (Yosef ben Shimon) was appointed commander of Jericho, John the Issene (Yohanan Issean) commander of Jaffa, Lydda, Ammeus-Nikopolis and the whole Tamna area. Elazar Ananias (Eliezar ben Hananiya) the joint commander in Edom together with Jesus ben Sapphas (Joshua ben Zafia), with Niger the Perean the war hero during the Gallus campaign under their command. Menasseh was appointed for Perea and John Ananias (Yohanan ben Hananiya) to Gophna and Acrabetta.

== Legacy ==
The name of Josephus Gurion was adopted by certain Jewish writer Josephus ben Gorion in the Middle Ages, who assembled the Josippon.

Josephus ben Gurion was the inspiration of David Grün, Jewish leader in Mandatory Palestine and later the first Prime Minister of Israel, to change his surname to Ben-Gurion.

== See also ==
- Simon bar Giora
- Simon bar Kokhba
