= Galilee campaign (67) =

Roman military campaign during the First Jewish–Roman War

Galilee Campaign
- Part of the First Jewish–Roman War
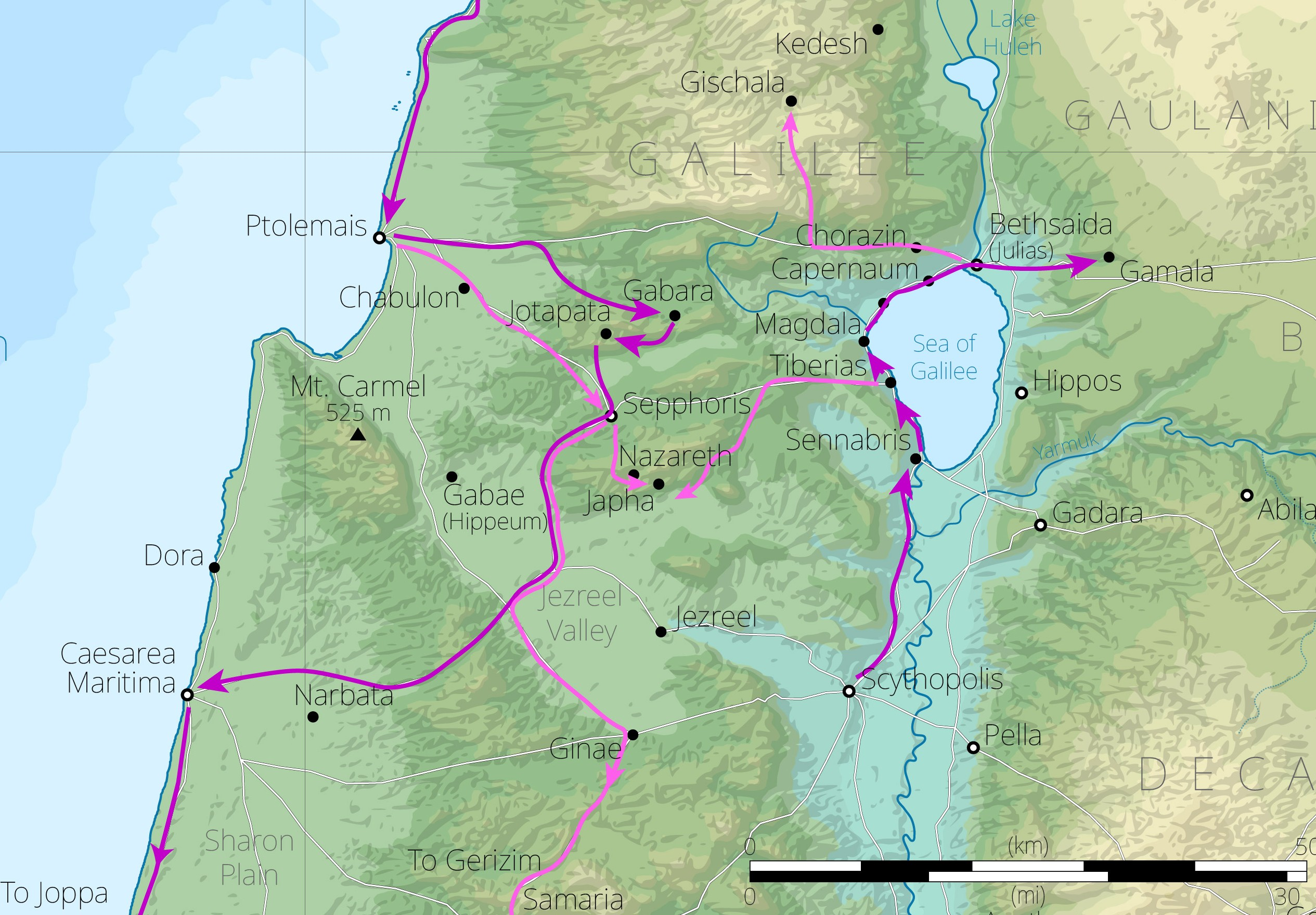
Date	April–December 67 CE
Location	Galilee (Judea Province)
Result	Roman victory

Belligerents
Roman Empire	Judean provisional government: Northern Command; Zealot factions

Commanders and leaders
Vespasian; Titus; Agrippa II (WIA)	Josephus (POW) John of Giscala; Justus of Tiberias †

Units involved
X Fretensis; V Macedonica; Legio XV Apollinaris Several cohorts of auxiliaries Agrippa II's forces	Judean command in Galilee; Zealot rebel factions

Strength
60,000 soldiers and auxiliaries	20,000 Jewish militias

Casualties and losses
- 100,000 Judean rebels and civilians dead

The Galilee campaign, also known as the Northern Revolt, took place in the year 67, when Roman general Vespasian invaded Galilee under the orders of Emperor Nero in order to crush the Great Revolt of Judea. Many Galilean towns gave up without a fight, although others had to be taken by force. By the year 68, Jewish resistance in the north had been crushed, and Vespasian made Caesarea Maritima his headquarters and methodically proceeded to cleanse the coastline of the country, avoiding direct confrontation with the rebels at Jerusalem.

The Galilee campaign is unusually well-recorded for the era. One of the Jewish rebel leaders in Galilee, Josephus, was captured. Josephus struck up a friendship with Vespasian, who would later ascend to become Roman Emperor. Josephus was eventually freed and given a place of honor in the Flavian dynasty, taking the name Flavius, and worked as a court historian with the backing of the Imperial family. In his work The Jewish War, the chief source on the Great Revolt, he provides detailed accounts of the sieges of Gamla and Yodfat, and of internal Jewish politics during the Galilee campaign.

== Background ==
The Galilee then had a significant Jewish population primarily living in easily fortifiable villages.

The Romans faced a substantial challenge in the Galilee. Unable to confront the Romans directly on the battlefield, the Jews retreated to their cities and villages, compelling the Romans to lay siege in order to suppress the resistance.

According to Josephus, he fortified several sites in the Galilee. These included, in Lower Galilee: Yodfat, Bersabe, Selame, Caphareccho, Japha, Sigoph, Mount Tabor, Tarichaea, and Tiberias; in Upper Galilee: Seph, Jamnith, and Mero; and in the Golan: Seleucia, Soganaea, and Gamla. He also reported fortifying the caves of Arbela and the rock of Acchabaron. Josephus further claims to have raised an army of 100,000 men, though this figure is considered implausible; historian Lester L. Grabbe, for example, regards it as "grossly exaggerated". It appears that while some form of irregular militia was assembled from various towns, its effectiveness was limited. In practice, only Josephus’ mercenaries and personal guard (estimated by Grabbe at around 5,000 men) seem to have operated under his direct command.

== Timeline ==
=== Preparations ===
After the defeat of Gallus, Emperor Nero entrusted the command of the war to Vespasian, a 57-year-old commander and former consul. According to Roman historian Suetonius, Vespasian was chosen "both for his proven energy and because his family and name were not feared due to their obscurity."

Vespasian then traveled overland from Corinth to Syria, gathering an army that included three full legions: the V Macedonica and X Fretensis, both of which had fought in Armenia, with the latter being stationed in Syria. The XV Apollinaris, which had also participated in the Armenian campaign, was marched from its station in Alexandria to Akko-Ptolemais by Titus, Vespasian's 27-year-old firstborn son. The Roman forces were bolstered by 23 auxiliary cohortes and six alae of cavalry, likely drawn from Syria. In addition to these, troops were supplied by local rulers: Antiochus IV of Commagene, Agrippa II, and Sohaemus of Emesa each contributed 2,000 infantry archers and 1,000 cavalry, while Malchus II of Nabatea sent 1,000 cavalry and as many as 5,000 infantry.

=== Early advances ===
Vespasian established his base of operations in the port city of Akko-Ptolemais (modern Acre), arriving in the summer of 67 CE. From this location, the Romans launched their offensive against the rebels. The people of Sepphoris–the capital of the Galilee and the second-largest Jewish city in the country after Jerusalem–surrendered to the Romans by meeting Vespasian in Ptolemais and formally pledging their loyalty to Rome. Gabara (was captured by the Romans in the first assault, with all males reportedly killed due to animosity towards the Jews and the memory of Gallus' defeat. The city and surrounding villages were set on fire, and survivors were enslaved.

=== Fall of Yodfat ===
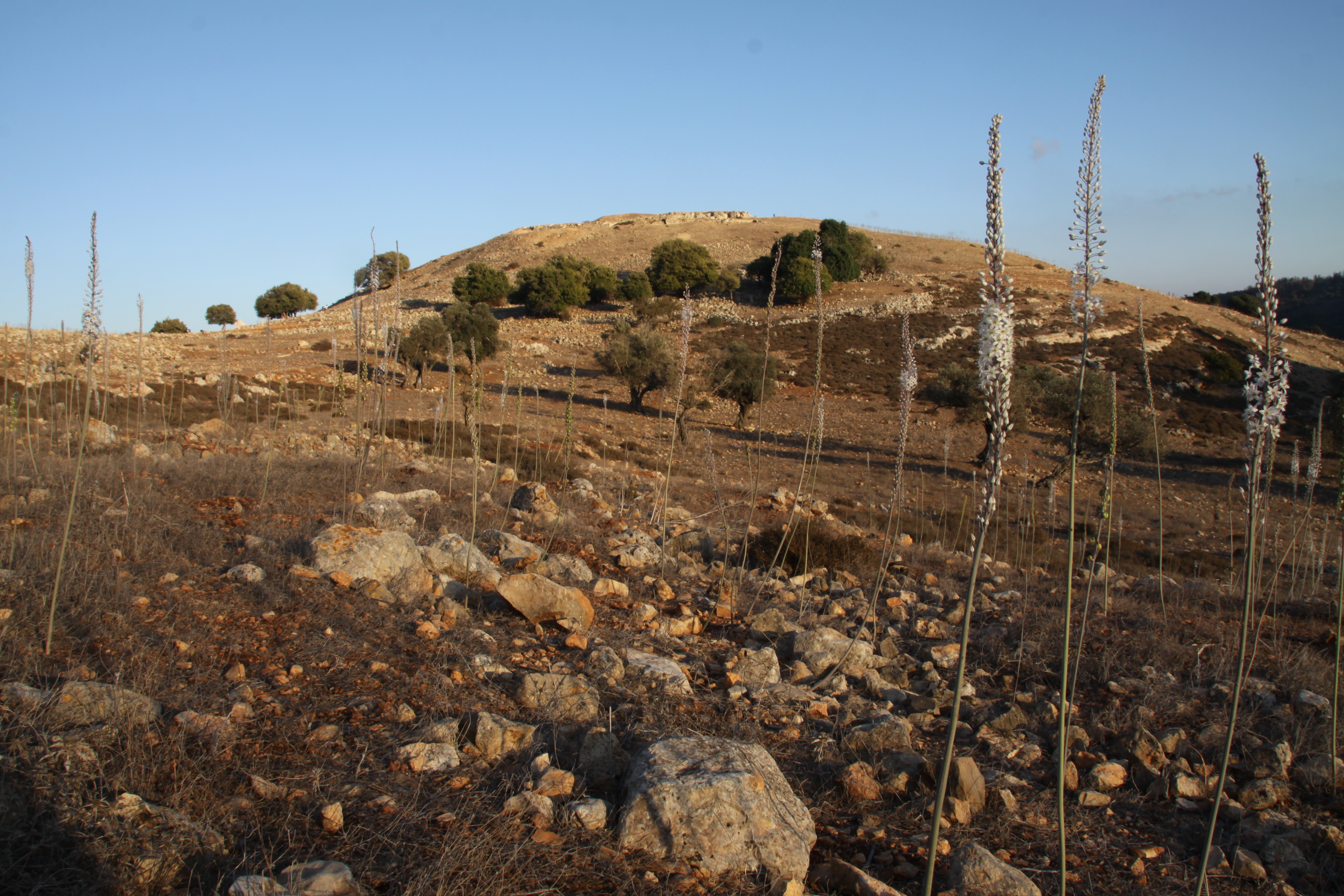
The ruins of Yodfat

The Romans then moved to attack Yodfat (Yodefat/Iotapata), a town with an estimated population of 7,000 on the eve of the siege. The town fell after a 47-day siege, which Josephus, who led its defense, documented in great detail. The defenders employed various materials to absorb projectiles and battering ram strikes, and counterattacked the besieging forces with boulders and boiling oil—marking the first recorded use of this tactic. Dozens of arrowheads and ballista stones were discovered at the site.

When the Romans finally captured the city, they massacred all those who were found in the open and hunted down the rest in hiding; Josephus estimates 40,000 died, though modern estimates suggest around 2,000 were killed, with 1,200 women and infants captured. Excavations at Yodfat uncovered a cistern containing the remains of approximately twenty people, including men, women, and children, some of whom showed evidence of violent deaths. This finding, alongside scattered remains across the site, suggests that after the Roman destruction, survivors or returning Jews gathered unburied bones and interred them in cisterns and caves.

Josephus records that following the fall of Yodfat, he and 40 others took refuge in a deep pit. When discovered, they resolved to commit suicide by drawing lots. After being left among the final two survivors, Josephus chose to surrender to the Romans rather than take his own life. Soon after, upon meeting Vespasian, Josephus prophesied the general's rise to emperor, which led Vespasian to spare his life.

Around the same time, Vespasian's son Titus led a force to destroy the nearby village of Iaphia, where all male inhabitants, excluding infants, were reportedly slain, and the infants and women were sold into slavery. Cerialis, who commanded Legio V Macedonica, was dispatched to fight a large group of Samaritans who had gathered atop Mount Gerizim, the site of their ruined temple, killing many. After the fall of Yodfat, Vespasian and Titus took a 20-day respite in Caesarea Philippi (Panias), the capital of Agrippa II.

=== Conquest of Tarichaea ===
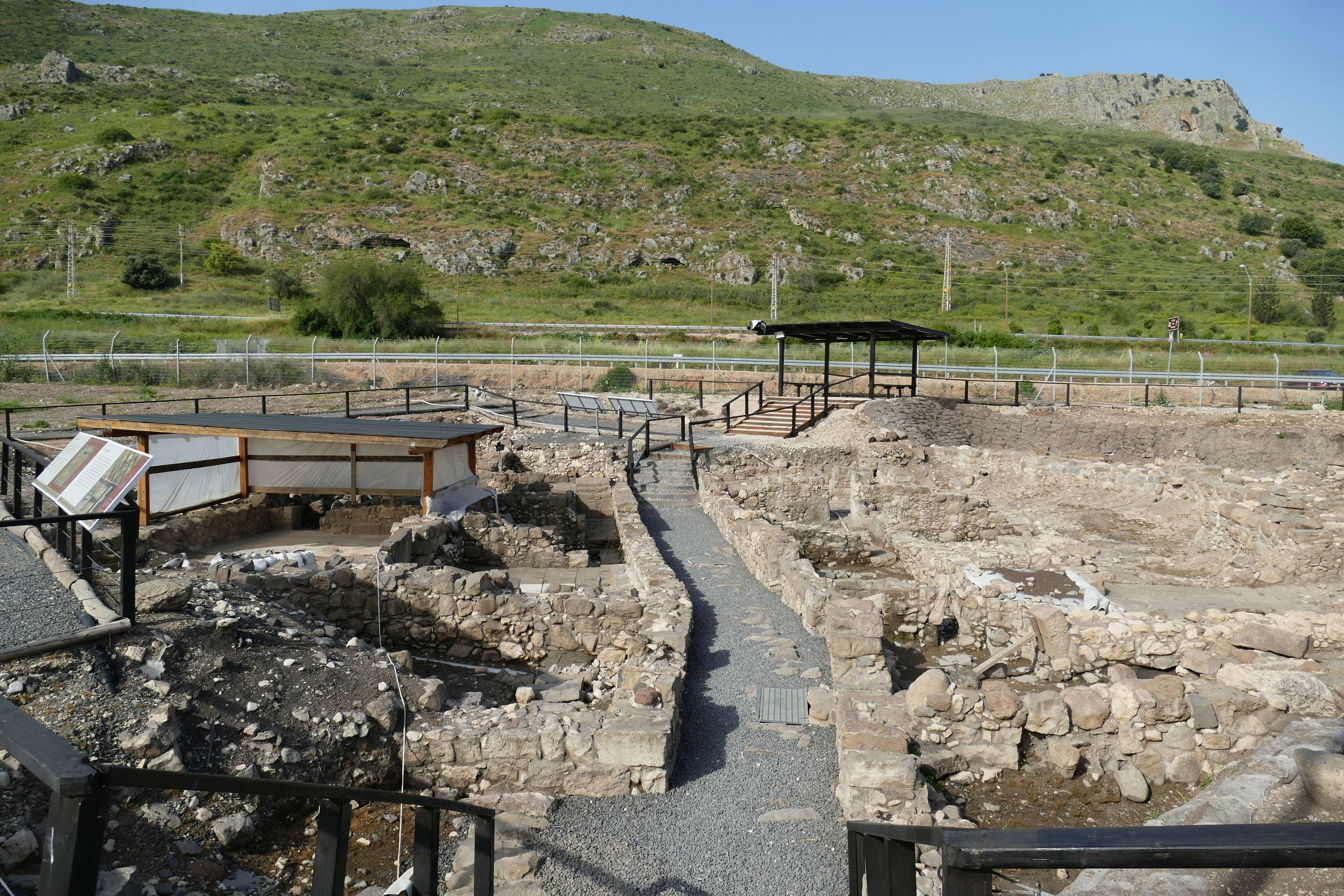
The ruins of Tarichaea (Magdala)

When military operations resumed, Tiberias, a Jewish-majority city that was part of Agrippa's realm, surrendered to the Romans without resistance. The city's population, which had been divided into pro-revolt and pro-Roman factions, saw the pro-Roman faction prevail as the Roman army approached.

By contrast, Tarichaea, a port town north of Tiberias, mounted a fierce defense but was eventually subdued. According to Josephus, the residents of Tarichae did not initially want to fight, but the influx of outsiders to the city became more determined to resist following a decisive defeat outside the walls. After its fall, surviving rebels took to the Sea of Galilee, engaging the Romans in naval skirmishes that resulted in heavy losses for the Jews. Josephus reports that 6,700 were killed in Taricheae, leaving the lake stained red with blood and floating bodies. Afterward, Vespasian separated the local prisoners from the "foreigners" blamed for instigating the revolt; the latter were forced to travel along a guarded route to Tiberias, where, in the city's stadium, 1,200 were executed. Six thousand young men were reportedly sent to work on the Corinth Canal in Greece, some were given as a gift to Agrippa II, and 30,400 were sold into slavery.

=== Siege of Gamla ===
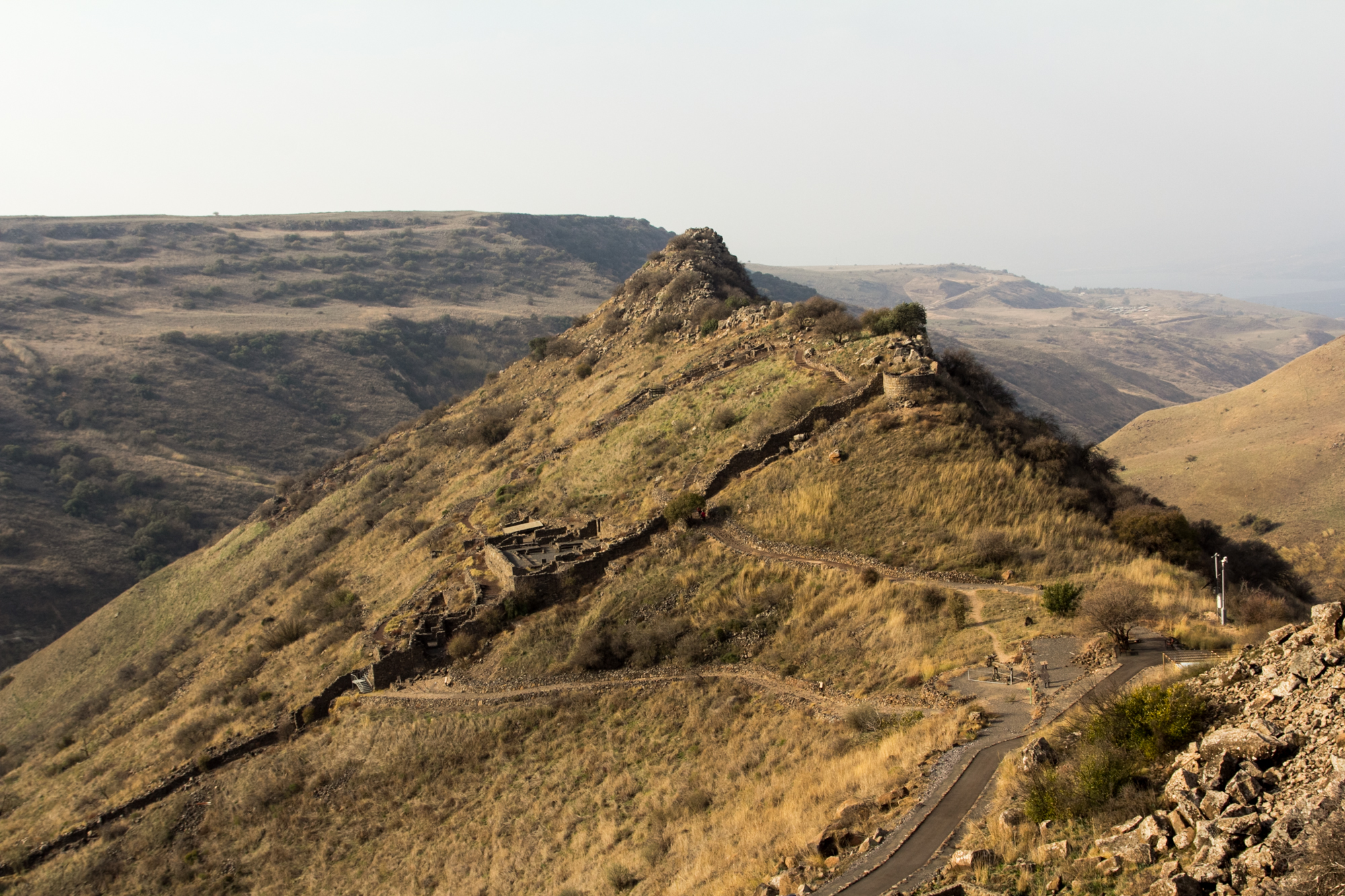
Gamla, a fortified town in the Golan, captured in October 67 after a siege

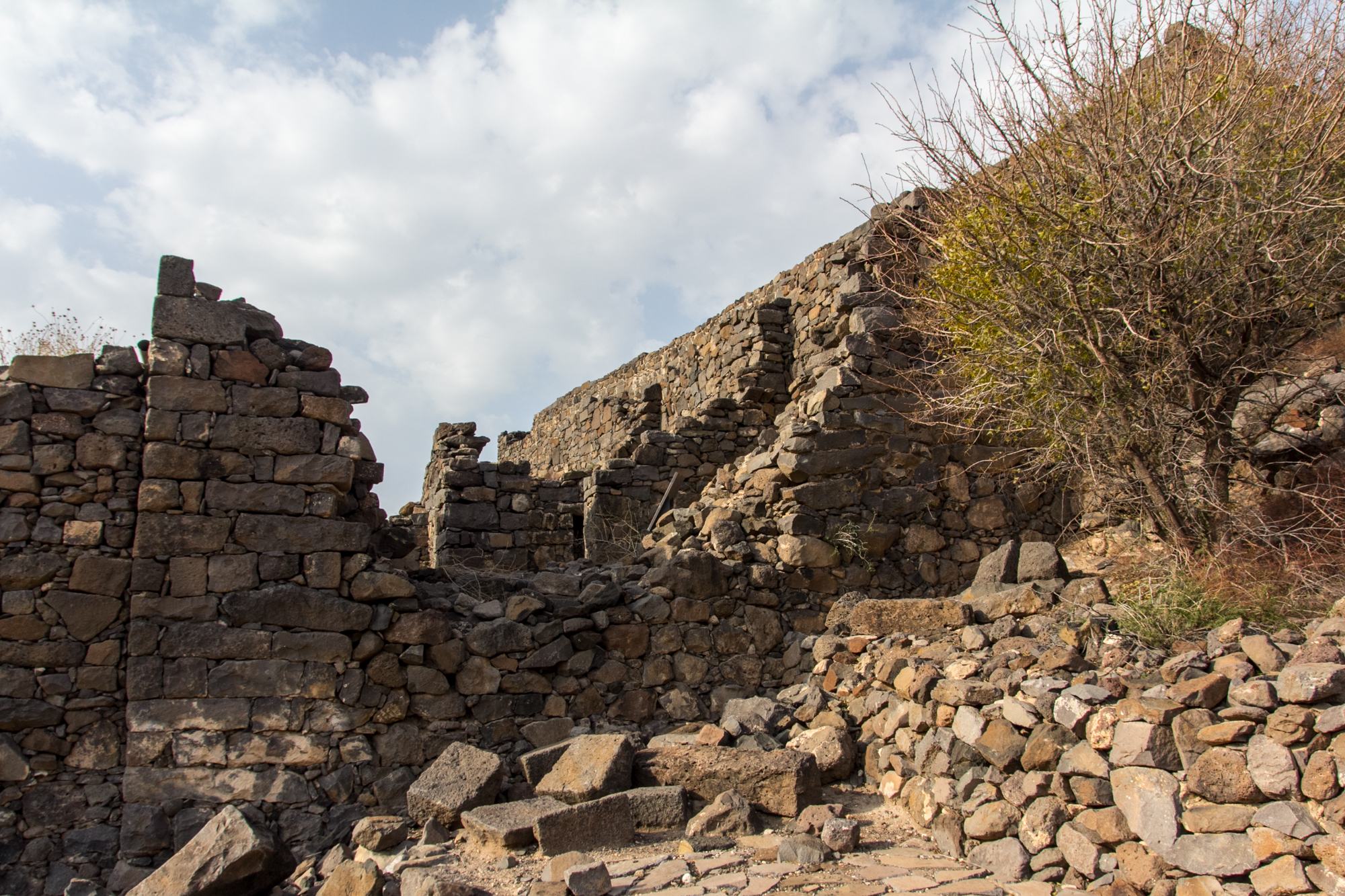
The main breach in Gamla's wall

Roman-era ballista (reconstructed at Gamla)The Roman campaign then shifted to Gamla, a fortified city on a steep rocky promontory in the southern Golan. Part of Agrippa II's realm, the city was initially loyal to Rome, but later switched allegiance and minted its own revolt coins. Josephus, who claimed to have walled the city, had in reality only hastily sealed gaps between existing structures along the city's perimeter. Now a prisoner of war rather than a commander, he accompanied the Romans and documented the siege firsthand.

Archaeological finds at the site include various pieces of Roman armor, around 100 catapult bolts, roughly 1,600 arrowheads, and close to 2,000 ballista stones. Gamla's synagogue was seemingly repurposed during the war into a refuge for displaced individuals, as indicated by the presence of fireplaces, cookpots, and storage jars near its northern wall. These objects were found buried beneath Roman ballista stones. Despite heavy Roman casualties, the city was eventually captured in October 67 after a siege, and was never resettled. According to Josephus, only two women survived the onslaught, with the rest either throwing themselves into ravines or being killed by the Romans.

=== Gush Halav and Tabor ===
The Romans also captured the fortress on Mount Tabor. In Gush Halav, a town in Upper Galilee, rebel leader John of Gischala attempted to negotiate a surrender but instead fled with his followers during a brief Shabbat respite granted by Titus. When Titus returned, the city surrendered to the Romans.

Another Roman force recaptured the coastal city of Jaffa, putting an end to the rebel activities that had flourished in Judaea's coast following Gallus's withdrawal. The rebels had engaged in piracy, disrupting connections with other parts of the empire and threatening vital grain supplies. The Romans were aided by a storm that destroyed the rebel fleet.

== Casualties ==
According to Josephus, the Roman vanquishing of Galilee resulted in 100,000 Jews being killed or sold into slavery.

== Aftermath ==
By the year 68, Jewish resistance in the north had been crushed, and Vespasian made Caesarea Maritima his headquarters and methodically proceeded to cleanse the coastline of the country, avoiding direct confrontation with the rebels at Jerusalem.

== Bibliography ==
- Alon, Gedaliah (1977). Jews, Judaism and the Classical World: Studies in Jewish History in the Times of the Second Temple and Talmud. Magnes Press. ISBN 978-9-652-23468-1. Archived from the original on 19 December 2024.
- Aviam, Mordechai (2002). "Yodefat/Jotapata: The archaeology of the first battle". In Berlin, Andrea M.; Overman, J. Andrew (eds.). The First Jewish Revolt: Archaeology, History, and Ideology. London and New York: Routledge. pp. 121–133. ISBN 978-0-415-62024-6. Archived from the original on 22 December 2024.
- Grabbe, Lester L. (2021). A History of the Jews and Judaism in the Second Temple Period, Volume 4: The Jews under the Roman Shadow (4 BCE–150 CE). The Library of Second Temple Studies. T&T Clark. ISBN 978-0-567-70070-4.
- Horsley, Richard A. (2002). "Power vacuum and power struggle in 66–7 CE". In Berlin, Andrea M.; Overman, J. Andrew (eds.). The First Jewish Revolt: Archaeology, History, and Ideology. London and New York: Routledge. pp. 87–109. ISBN 978-0-415-62024-6. Archived from the original on 22 December 2024.
- Magness, Jodi (2012). The Archaeology of the Holy Land: From the Destruction of Solomon's Temple to the Muslim Conquest. Cambridge University Press. ISBN 978-1-139-01383-3.
- Mason, Steve (2016). A History of the Jewish War: AD 66–74. Key Conflicts of Classical Antiquity. Cambridge University Press. doi:10.1017/CBO9781139020718. ISBN 978-1-139-02071-8.
- Meyers, Eric M. (2002). "Sepphoris: City of peace". In Berlin, Andrea M.; Overman, J. Andrew (eds.). The First Jewish Revolt: Archaeology, History, and Ideology. London and New York: Routledge. pp. 110–120. ISBN 978-0-415-62024-6. Archived from the original on 22 December 2024.
- Millar, Fergus (1995). The Roman Near East: 31 BC–AD 337. Harvard University Press. ISBN 978-0-674-77886-3. Archived from the original on 7 December 2024.
- Murison, Charles Leslie (2016). "The Emperor Titus". In Zissos, Andrew (ed.). A Companion to the Flavian Age of Imperial Rome. Wiley. pp. 76–91. doi:10.1002/9781118878149.ch4. ISBN 978-1-444-33600-9.
- Rogers, Guy MacLean (2022). For the Freedom of Zion: The Great Revolt of Jews against Romans, 66–74 CE. Yale University Press. ISBN 978-0-300-24813-5. Archived from the original on 7 December 2024.
- Smallwood, E. Mary (1976). The Jews under Roman Rule from Pompey to Diocletian. SBL Press. ISBN 978-90-04-50204-8. Archived from the original on 22 April 2024.
- Syon, Danny (2002). "Gamla: City of refuge". In Berlin, Andrea M.; Overman, J. Andrew (eds.). The First Jewish Revolt: Archaeology, History, and Ideology. London and New York: Routledge. pp. 134–153. ISBN 978-0-415-62024-6. Archived from the original on 22 December 2024.
- Stern, Menachem (1976). "The Period of the Second Temple". A History of the Jewish People. Cambridge, Massachusetts: Harvard University Press. pp. 185–303. ISBN 0-674-39731-2.
- van Kooten, George H. (2011). "The Jewish War and the Roman Civil War of 68–69 CE: Jewish, Pagan, and Christian Perspectives". In Popović, Mladen (ed.). The Jewish Revolt against Rome: Interdisciplinary Perspectives. Brill. pp. 419–450. doi:10.1163/9789004216693_018. ISBN 978-9-004-21668-6. Archived from the original on 21 June 2024.
- Vervaet, Frederik Juliaan (2016). "The Remarkable Rise of the Flavians". In Zissos, Andrew (ed.). A Companion to the Flavian Age of Imperial Rome. Wiley. pp. 41–59. doi:10.1002/9781118878149.ch2. ISBN 978-1-444-33600-9.
- Wilker, Julia (2012). ""God is with Italy now" Pro-Roman Jews and the Jewish Revolt". In Eckhardt, Benedikt (ed.). Jewish Identity and Politics between the Maccabees and Bar Kokhba Groups, Normativity, and Rituals. Supplements to the Journal for the Study of Judaism. Vol. 155. Brill. pp. 157–187. doi:10.1163/9789004218512_010. ISBN 978-9-004-21046-2. Archived from the original on 9 May 2024.
