= Judean provisional government =

Governing entity in Judea (66 CE–68 CE)

Israel 𐤉𐤔𐤓𐤀𐤋
- 66 CE–68 CE
- A coin issued by the rebels in 68, note Paleo-Hebrew alphabet. Obverse: "Shekel, Israel. Year 3." Reverse: "Jerusalem the Holy"

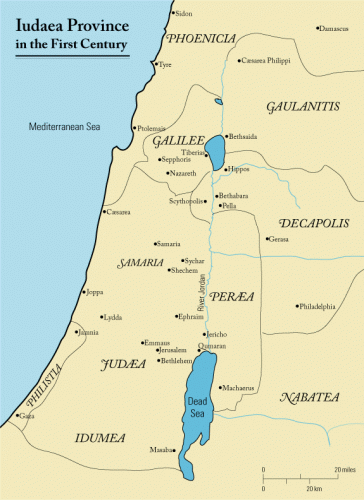
- Judaea and the Galilee in the first century
- Status: Unrecognized state (66 CE–68 CE)
- Capital: Jerusalem
- Common languages: Old Aramaic (official), Koine Greek; Biblical Hebrew (liturgical)
- Religion: Second Temple Judaism
- Demonym: Judean
- Government: Provisional government
- Head of State
  - 66–68 CE: Joseph ben Gurion
- Historical era: First Jewish-Roman War
  - Proclaimed: 66 CE
  - Zealot coup in Jerusalem: 68 CE
- Currency: Shekel
- Today part of: Israel; Palestine

The Judean provisional government is a historiographical name for the short-lived de facto governing entity in Judea, which was established during the Great Jewish Revolt in the year 66 CE by Judean rebel forces of the Pharisee and Sadducee parties. It aimed to create and govern a full Jewish state, although its influence was concentrated in Jerusalem. The government functioned until the Zealot coup in the year 68 CE, when most of its leaders were massacred in the inter-rebel struggle.

== History ==
=== Formation ===
Following the Battle of Beth Horon which saw the defeat of Gallus in 66 CE, an assembly of the people was called under the spiritual guidance of Simeon ben Gamliel, and thus the Judean provisional government was formed in Jerusalem. Ananus ben Ananus, the former High Priest of Israel, was appointed one of the heads of the government and began reinforcing the city, with Joshua ben Gamla also taking a leading role. Yosef ben Matityahu was appointed the commander in Galilee and Golan, while Yosef ben Shimon was appointed commander of Jericho. John the Essene was appointed commander of Jaffa, Lydda, Ammeus-Nikopolis and the whole Tamna area. Eleazar ben Hanania was appointed the joint commander in Edom together with Joshua ben Zafia, with Niger the Perean, a hero during the Gallus campaign, under their command. Menasseh was appointed to cover Perea and Yohanan ben Hananiya allocated Gophna and Acrabetta.

=== Coinage ===
According to Cecil Roth, the new government began almost immediately to mint silver coins which, although they were "not distinguished either in design or execution," were of symbolic importance in the struggle for independence both because they were devoid of the name, reign year and image of the Roman emperor, and because they were made of silver. Silver coinage was the privilege of Imperial mints; the bronze coins that provinces were allowed to mint were a symbol of the subjugation of provinces to Rome. There is broad scholarly agreement that coins issued by the Judean government during the Revolt use an archaic Hebrew script and Jewish symbols including pomegranate buds, lulavs, etrogs, and phrases including "Shekel of Israel," and "The Freedom of Zion" (חרות ציון Herut Zion), as political statements intended to rally support for independence.

=== Disbandment ===
The provisional government became obsolete in the year 68, when inter-rebel strife led to the killing of most of its members. According to the historian Josephus, Ananus incited the people to rise up against the Zealots who were in control of the Temple. The forces of Ananus besieged the Zealots who held the Temple. When John of Gischala led the Zealots to believe that Ananus had contacted the Roman general Vespasian for assistance in retaking control of all Jerusalem, the Zealots, driven to desperation, asked the Idumeans for assistance in preventing the delivery of the city to the Romans. When the Edomites arrived, the Zealots opened the gates of Jerusalem to them, and the Edomites slaughtered ben Hanan (Ananus ben Ananus) and his forces.

After freeing the Zealots from the Temple, the Edomites and Zealots massacred the common people. Remnants of the rebel government summoned the peasant faction headed by Simon bar Giora to Jerusalem, in order to stand against the rampaging Zealots. While the charismatic Bar Giora took over much of the city, he did not attempt to restore the government, rather ruling by himself in a despotic manner. Bitter fighting between Zealot factions and Bar Giora continued until the Roman siege of 70 CE.

== Recognition ==
The rebel Judean government was not recognized at any time by the Roman Empire and in fact enjoyed limited recognition amongst the rebel factions. The Jerusalem-based rebel government had little authority in the Galilee, where locals were not satisfied with the fact that a non-local, Joseph ben Matityahu, was appointed a regional commander, marginalizing John of Gischala and Justus of Tiberias, who rejected his authority. Furthermore, the Judean-based Zealots, the peasantry and most Idumean factions were never under the direct control of the government. The Kingdom of Adiabene however did provide direct support to it, dispatching significant supplies and some 500 armed men in support.

== See also ==
- History of the Jews and Judaism in the Land of Israel
