= Eleazar ben Hanania =

1st century rebel leader in Judea

Eleazar ben Hanania (Hebrew: אלעזר בן חנניה; Ancient Greek: Ἐλεάζαρος υἱὸς Ἀνανία) was a Jewish leader during the Great Revolt of Judea. Eleazar was the son of the High Priest Hanania ben Nedebai and hence a political figure of the 1st century Judaea Province. Eleazar was the governor of the temple at the outbreak of the rebellion in 66 CE and following the initial outbreak of the violence in Jerusalem convinced the priests of the Jewish Temple to stop service of sacrifice for the Emperor. The action, though largely symbolic, was one of the main milestones to bring a full-scale rebellion in Judea.

Jewish political activity had become more pronounced when, after the death of Herod Agrippa, in 44 CE, Judea began to be treated more as a province of Rome and the Sanhedrin at Jerusalem was deprived of its jurisdiction. Numerous bands of Zealots began to fan local rebellions; but were ultimately quashed by the Roman procurators. Then matters reached a climax under the procurator, Gessius Florus, whose actions (as well of those of his predecessors) precipitated a crisis which galvanized the Zealots in 66 CE.

The then governor of the Temple, Eleazar ben Hanania refused to receive gifts from or offer sacrifice on behalf of Rome as had previously been agreed (dating at least back to Tiberius) and the Zealots now prevailed in political opinion. Another priest belonging to the Shammaite party, Zacharia ben Amphicalos, then supported Eleazar. Zealot Menahem ben Judah seized the fortress Masada, and killed the Roman garrison stationed there. Then Zealot Eleazar ben Simon really took the war of rebellion to the Romans. The army of Cestius Gallus, who had brought the XII Fulminata legion to avenge the defeat of the Roman garrison at Masada, was annihilated by the rebel alliance including also Bar Giora and the Zealots and the Great Revolt of Judea was underway.

== See also ==
- Battle of Beth Horon (66)
- Josephus
- The Jewish Encyclopedia
- Masada
- Jewish Temple
- Procurator (Ancient Rome)
- Eleazer ben Dinai (from the Jewish Encyclopedia)
- Zealots (from the Jewish Encyclopedia)
