= Niger the Perean =

1st century CE Jewish military leader

Niger of Perea (d. 68) was a military leader during the First Jewish–Roman War. During the attack on Cestius in 66, he distinguished himself, which led to his becoming governor of Idumea. The same year, he led a disastrous attack on Ashkelon, which remained loyal to the Roman Empire, along with John the Essene and Silas the Babylonian, both of whom died. He later led another failed attack on Ashkelon from Idumea. After this attack, he was described as having "filled all the Jews with an unexpected joy, as though he were preserved by God's providence to be their commander for the time to come". He was killed by zealots in Jerusalem, due to his moderate views, which led people to believe that he wanted to make peace with Rome.
