= Eleazar ben Simon =

1st century CE Zealot leader

Leader of the Zealot Faction

Personal details
- Died: 70 CE Jerusalem, Judaea
- Party: Zealots
- Known for: Leading the Zealots in civil war during the Jewish Revolt

Eleazar ben Simon (Hebrew: אלעזר בן שמעון) was a Zealot leader during the First Jewish-Roman War who fought against the armies of Cestius Gallus, Vespasian, and Titus Flavius. From the onset of the war in 66 CE until the destruction of the temple in 70 CE, he fought vehemently against the Roman garrisons in Judea and against his fellow Jewish political opponents in order to establish an independent Jewish state at Jerusalem. Although the Jewish defeat at Jerusalem cannot be entirely attributed to Eleazar ben Simon, his inability to establish unity with John of Gischala and Simon bar Giora resulted in a bitter civil war that weakened the Jewish resistance against Rome. Eleazar ben Simon and his Zealots' radical anti-Roman policies and eradication of the moderate temple aristocracy from Jerusalem in 67 CE also prevented any peaceful agreement with Rome to avoid the death and destruction which ensued in 70 CE.

== Disambiguation ==
Despite the common misconception, Eleazar ben Simon the Zealot is not the same person as Eleazar ben Ya'ir, the Sicarii leader at Masada. In Josephus' Bellum Judaicum, the primary source of the First Jewish-Roman War, important historical figures are introduced with their patrimonial name when they first appear, and addressed by first name in all following appearances. Since an "Eleazar, son of Simon" and an "Eleasar, son of Ya'ir" are introduced separately with their patrimonial name, Josephus intends to distinguish the two leaders as separate persons.

== Early life ==
Historical evidence of Eleazar arises in 66 CE, when he participated in crushing Cestius Gallus' Legio XII Fulminata at Beit-Horon. Yet prior to this encounter, little is known about his early life and rise to power. It can be inferred, however, from the geopolitical scene of Roman Judaea in the first century CE that he grew up in Galilee, the center of Zealotry. Zealots were shunned by the High Priesthood in Jerusalem prior to the revolt. This disunity with other sects of Judaism confined Zealotry to its birthplace in Galilee. Yet when the revolt broke out in 66 CE, the Galilean zealots fled the Roman massacres and sought refuge in the last major Jewish stronghold: Jerusalem. Since Eleazar was placed in command of a large army of Jews in the battle against Cestius' Legio, he had already risen to a position of power in the priesthood prior to his military success.

== Mature life ==
Eleazar ben Simon's radical anti-Roman ideology derived from a lifetime of oppression under Roman rule. Since 63 BCE, Roman garrisons stationed throughout Judaea had exploited Jews with punitive taxation, exceeding the quota set by the Roman Empire and keeping the surplus revenues for themselves. The Roman procurators also subjugated the Jewish High Priesthood, appointing pro-Roman Jews to positions of authority, and desecrated sacred Jewish practices with sacrilegious pagan rituals. In 39 CE, the Roman Emperor Caligula declared himself divine and ordered his troops in Jerusalem to place his name on the Temple. When the Jews refused, he threatened to destroy the temple but his sudden timely demise saved Jerusalem from a premature siege. Yet Caligula's threat caused many of the moderate Jews to shift towards radical anti-Roman political views. As the Roman burden became more onerous, Jewish priests alienated by the pro-Roman high priesthood joined in the effort to attain political and religious liberty by any means possible, thus forming the Zealots. Founded by Judas of Galilee, the Zealots kindled anti-Roman sentiment throughout Galilee and Judea.

In 66 CE, the Zealots instigated the First Jewish–Roman War when the high priest Eleazar b. Ananius refused to give sacrifice to the Roman Emperor and slaughtered Florus' Roman garrison in Jerusalem. In response, Nero ordered Cestius Gallus, the Roman legate of Syria, to crush the rebellion. With his Legio XII Fulminata of 5,000 men, Cestius Gallus was ambushed and defeated at Beit-Horon in 66 CE by 2,400 Zealots led by Eleazar ben Simon. Eleazar took the legion's equipment and movable wealth, returning to Jerusalem with substantial loot. He used the wealth acquired in this decisive victory as political leverage during the battle for power in Jerusalem in 67-69 CE.

Following his victory against Cestius' forces, Eleazar was deposed from power in Jerusalem by the High Priest Ananus ben Ananus. Although he had proven his devotion and leadership at Beit-Horon, Eleazar ben Simon was given no office "because of his tyrannical temperament" (B.J 2.564). Contrary to the radical anti-Roman agenda of the Zealots, Ananus and the other moderate leaders of Jerusalem wished to stabilize the conflict and reach equilibrium with Rome. They feared that appointing a Zealot to power would provoke Rome to attack and would diminish their own power. Despite his rejection from power, Eleazar remained in Jerusalem promoting the Zealot cause from his headquarters at the Temple. During the summer of 67, Eleazar ben Simon and his Zealots attempted to dismantle the moderate government of Ananus by imprisoning officials who remained from the procurator period before the revolt and spreading the fear that the moderate Temple aristocracy would undermine the Jewish nationalist cause. As the Roman general Vespasian's armies terrorized the countryside of Judea and Galilee, thousands of Jewish refugees joined Eleazar's ranks. With growing support, Eleazar successfully appointed a puppet High Priest in Jerusalem to usurp power from Ananus and seized control of the Temple.

The Zealot control of Jerusalem was confined to the inner court of the city and the Temple itself. Outnumbered and isolated by Ananus' troops surrounding the Temple, Eleazar control of the Temple was seriously threatened from the winter of 67 to the spring of 68. However, in 68 CE, John of Gischala, the hero who escaped Roman conquest in Galilee, joined forces with Eleazar ben Simon at Jerusalem and undermined the moderates' power. This alliance was rooted in their mutual dependence upon each other. John desperately needed Eleazar's funds to supply his followers, and Eleazar required the protection of John's large entourage to fend off Ananus.

Yet only until later that year did Eleazar and John seize control of the entire city. In the summer of 68, the Idumeans from the south imposed their support for the Zealots by helping John and Eleazar eradicate Ananus and the moderates from Jerusalem. Due their fear that Ananus would betray the nationalist cause and surrender to the Romans in order to solidify his position of power, the Idumeans invested their support in Eleazar and John's coalition in hopes of establishing a more radical government to counter the inevitable Roman attack. From 68 CE to 69 CE this alliance between Eleazar and his Zealots, John of Gischala, and the Idumeans ruled Jerusalem with unstable leadership. With complete control over the city, Eleazar and John exploited their power and slaughtered the remnants of Ananus' moderate party in Jerusalem in a misguided attempt to unite the city. During this period, John had distanced himself from Eleazar and the Zealots in order to avoid association with their tyrannical behavior and claim sole leadership.

As a result of this despotic leadership and their insufficient representation in the government, many Idumeans defected to a violent extremist group outside the city walls known as the Sicarii, led by Simon b. Gioras. By 69 CE, with the support of most Idumeans, Simon captured Jerusalem and reduced Eleazar and John to a powerless state confinement in the Temple and inner court. Simon ben Gioras' control of Jerusalem rendered Eleazar and John's alliance useless and the Zealots split from John and barricaded themselves in the Temple. Just as Ananus' forces had surrounded him, in 69 CE. Eleazar found himself in a similar situation of helplessness. This year was marked by bitter civil war between the three factions under Simon, John, and Eleazar. According to Tacitus, "there were three generals and three armies, and between these three there was constant fighting, treachery, and arson" (Histories 5.12.3). Although Titus Flavius, the son of Emperor Vespasian, and his army were nearing Jerusalem, Eleazar and the other two leaders did not unite to prepare for the attack and were severely weakened by 70 CE. For example, some of the Zealots under Eleazar burned large stockpiles of food that would have lasted the Jews several years in order to "remove the security blanket" and force everyone to fight (Goodman 195).

== Death ==
It is unknown how Eleazar ben Simon died. Days prior to the siege of Jerusalem, Eleazar ben Simon was betrayed by John of Gischala. According to Josephus, John sent a party to the Zealot stronghold in the Temple to offer a sacrifice before the coming festival of Passover. Yet when Eleazar and his Zealots opened the gates to permit entry, John's forces slaughtered the inhabitants of the temple while the Zealots tried to flee. Nothing is known of Eleazar's fate after this betrayal, except for the fact that Josephus mentioned him as still commanding the Zealots when they rejoined John in his fight against Simon bar Giora.

== Bibliography ==
- Applebaum, Shimon. "The Zealots: the Case for Revaluation". The Journal of Roman Studies, Vol. 61, (1971), pp. 155–170. Society for Promotion of Roman studies. Retrieved on 7 December 2008.
- Finklestein, Louis, William Horbury, William David Davies, and John Sturdy. "Titus' Siege of Jerusalem". The Cambridge History of Judaism. pp. 543–544. Cambridge University Press, 1999.
- Goodman, Martin. The Ruling Class of Judaea: The Origins of the Jewish Revolt Against Rome, A.D. 66–70. Cambridge University Press, 1993.
- Ilan, Tal and Jonathan L. Price. "Seven Onomastic Problems in Josephus' 'Bellum Judaicum'". The Jewish Quarterly Review, New Series, Vol. 84, No. 2/3 (Oct., 1993 – Jan., 1994), pp. 189–208. JSTOR. University of Pennsylvania. Retrieved on 7 December 2008.
- Josephus, Flavius. The Wars of the Jews. Translated by William Whiston. J.M. Dent and Sons, 1989.
- Sicker, Martin. Between Rome and Jerusalem: 300 Years of Roman-Judean Relations. Greenwood, 2001.
- Tacitus. The Histories. Translated by George Ramsay. Jamal Murray, 1915.
- Telushkin, Joseph. "The Great Revolt". Jewish Literacy. NY: William Morrow and Co., 1991. Jewish Virtual Library. Retrieved on 7 December 2008.
