= Emilio Gabba =

Italian historian (1927–2013)

Emilio Gabba (31 March 1927 – 12 August 2013) was an Italian historian who specialised in Roman history.

== Biography ==
Gabba was born in Pavia on 31 March 1927, to an upper-middle-class family. A pupil of Plinio Fraccaro at Pavia from 1949 to 1950, he started there a close working relationship with fellow Romanist Arnaldo Momigliano. He was a fellow at the American Academy in Rome in 1955 and later was a visiting professor at the University of Pennsylvania and University of Michigan.

His first work was a highly influential essay on the Marian reforms. Some of his important later works were a commentary on Appian's Civil Wars, a book on the Greek historians who lived during the Principate, and a book on the army and society of the late Roman Republic.

He was a professor of Roman history at the universities of Pisa and Pavia from 1958–1974 and 1974–1996, respectively. His work largely related to Roman history from the late Republic through to the late Roman Empire with special focus on the process of Romanisation and municipalisation in Italy. He became director of the ancient history journal Athenaeum, published by the University of Pavia, in 1990 and later became head of the Italian Historical Review in 1995.

He died on 12 August 2013 at the age of 86. He had more than 800 published works and received honorary degrees from many prestigious institutions.

== Selected works ==
- Gabba, Emilio (1956). Appiano e la storia delle guerre civili (in Italian). La Nuova Italia. ISBN 9788822124234.
- Gabba, Emilio (1959). Storici greci dell'impero romano da Augusto ai Severi (in Italian).
- Gabba, Emilio (1973). Esercito e società nella tarda Repubblica romana (in Italian). La nuova Italia. ISBN 9788822124241.
- Gabba, Emilio (1976). Republican Rome, the army and the allies. Translated by Cuff, P J. Oxford: Blackwell. ISBN 978-0-631-17150-8.
