= John of Gischala =

Jewish revolt leader in the First Jewish-Roman War

- Born: John, son of Levi (Hebrew: יוחנן בן לוי); Gischala, Judaea Province
- Political party: Zealots
- Opponents: Ananus; Simon Bar Giora; Eleazar ben Simon; Titus

John of Gischala (Ancient Greek: Ἰωάννης, Ioánnes; Hebrew: יוחנן מגוש חלב, fl. 70) was a leader of the first Jewish revolt against the Romans.

== History ==
During the Jewish war with Rome, John of Gischala (Ancient Greek: Ἰωάννης ἀπὸ Γισχάλων), son of Levi (υἱὸς Ληΐου), vied with Josephus over the control of Galilee and amassed a large band of supporters from Gischala (Gush Halav) and Gabara, including the support of the Sanhedrin in Jerusalem.

As part of the Roman campaign to put down the revolt in Judea, Titus marched on Gush Halav, called Giscala by the Romans. Giscala was the last town in Galilee not yet conquered. Outside the walls of the city, he called on them to surrender. John prevailed upon Titus not to enter the city that day, as it was Sabbath, "not so much out of regard to the seventh day as to his own preservation." John fled to Jerusalem that night, and "Titus was greatly displeased that he had not been able to bring this John, who had deluded him, to punishment."

When John entered Jerusalem, it was in an uproar, and the people clamoured for news.

John...went about among all the people, and persuaded them to go to war, by the hopes he gave them. He affirmed that the affairs of the Romans were in a weak condition, and extolled his own power. He also jested upon the ignorance of the unskillful, as if those Romans, although they should take to themselves wings, could never fly over the wall of Jerusalem, who found such great difficulties in taking the villages of Galilee, and had broken their engines of war against their walls. These harangues of John's corrupted a great part of the young men, and puffed them up for the war.

Soon after his arrival in Jerusalem, he played an instrumental part in the outcome of the Zealot Temple Siege, handing the city over to control of the Zealots. He attempted to set himself up as ruler of Jerusalem but was challenged in April 69 by Simon Bar Giora. They were both in turn challenged by a third faction led by Eleazar ben Simon. John and the Zealots fought in the civil war with these two factions until he was finally captured by Titus during the Siege of Jerusalem. He was sentenced to life imprisonment, taken to Rome and paraded through the streets in chains.

== Legacy ==
He was the subject of the Italian drama Giovanni di Giscala (1754) by Alfonso Varano. The work inspired the Italian opera Giovanni di Giscala (1855) by Giovanni Gaetano Rossi and Alfonso Cavagnar.

He is portrayed by the Israeli actor Igal Naor in the 2021 animated historical drama film Legend of Destruction.

He is a character in the Josephus Trilogy, by Lion Feuchtwanger, which is a trilogy that focuses on Josephus Flavius beginning in the year 60 in Rome.
