= Simon bar Giora =

Jewish revolt leader in the First Jewish–Roman War

- Born: Gerasa, Judaea
- Died: 71 CE; Rome, Roman Empire
- Cause of death: Execution
- Known for: Participating in the First Jewish–Roman War, leading a major faction in civil war
- Political party: Peasantry (likely related with Zealots)
- Opponents: Titus; John of Giscala; Eleazar ben Simon

Simon bar Giora (alternatively known as Simeon bar Giora or Simon ben Giora or Shimon bar Giora, Imperial Aramaic: שִׁמְעוֹן בַּר גִּיּוֹרָא or Hebrew: שִׁמְעוֹן בֵּן גִּיּוֹרָא; died 71 CE) was the leader of one of the major Judean rebel factions during the First Jewish–Roman War in 1st-century Roman Judea, who vied for control of the Jewish polity while attempting to expel the Roman army, but incited a bitter internecine war in the process.

== Life ==
=== Background ===
The name Simon bar Giora identifies him as "Simon, son of Giora." "Simon" was a common Jewish name in the Second Temple period. The name Giora (גִּיּוֹרָא) means "convert" or "sojourner" in Aramaic, and is equivalent to the Hebrew word ger (Hebrew: גֵּר), indicating a non-Jewish background; the name appears on ossuaries found in the vicinity of Jerusalem. Most scholars today agree that his father was a Gentile convert to Judaism, who observed Jewish law.

Josephus describes Simon as "a Gerasene by origin," with the exact location of this Gerasa remaining debated. While this might suggest Gerasa in the Decapolis (modern Jerash), which hosted a Jewish community during this period, the identification is problematic. In another passage, Josephus refers to the destruction of a Gerasa in Judaea, during Vespasian's campaign to isolate Jerusalem—pointing to a different site. Proposed alternatives include Gezer (Gazara), possibly due to a textual transposition; the former village of Jarash near the Cave of the Twins; and the modern Jurish, in the region of Acrabatene in Samaria, where Simon was later active. Some scholars suggest that "Gerasene" may refer to Simon's family origin rather than his own birthplace. Given his presence in Acrabatene and around Bethoron, a location in Judaea—rather than in Transjordan—is generally considered more plausible.

=== Activities in the First Jewish Revolt ===
Simon became notable during the First Jewish–Roman War when Roman troops under Cestius Gallus marched towards Jerusalem in 66. Simon spearheaded the attack against these advancing Roman troops, and helped in defeating the advance by attacking from the north, as they approached Beth Horon. He put the hindmost of the army into disorder and carried off many of the beasts that carried the weapons of war, and led them into the city. This victory marked the beginning of the First Jewish-Roman War, in the 12th year of Nero's reign. However, he was rejected for a command position by the Jerusalem authorities, for they did not want a popular leader of a rebellious peasantry if they were to moderate the revolt and negotiate with the Romans. As a result, Simon gathered a large number of revolutionaries and started robbing houses of wealthy people in the district of Acrabbene:

But as for the Acrabbene toparchy, Simon, the son of Gioras, which means "The Strong", got a great number of those that were fond of innovations together, and betook himself to ravage the country; nor did he only harass the rich men's houses, but tormented their bodies, and appeared openly and beforehand to affect tyranny in his government. And when an army was sent against him by Artanus, and the other rulers, he and his band retired to the robbers that were at Masada.

Meanwhile, a large force of Idumeans had encamped outside the walls of Jerusalem, and were barred by the citizenry from entering inside the city, in hopes of preserving the peace. Members of the Zealot party secretly opened one of the gates to bring them inside, hoping thereby to augment their forces against the common enemy of Rome. Now outraged that they had been barred from the city by the citizenry, the Idumeans went about murdering the common people of the city, including two of Israel's High Priests, Ananus ben Ananus and Joshua ben Gamla.

Simon stayed safe in Masada from the Judean provisional Government authorities until Ananus ben Ananus was killed in the Zealot Temple Siege, after which he left the fortress for the hill country and proclaimed liberty for those in slavery, and a reward to those already free. He gathered power quickly as more people and influential men joined him. He soon dared to venture into the flatlands, constructed a fort in a village called Nain, and stored food and booty within caves in Pharan valley. It was obvious that he prepared to attack Jerusalem. However, Simon ben Giora first attacked Idumea to the south of Jerusalem, sacking its many villages, and his intimidating army met no real resistance. He marched into Hebron, robbed the grain stores of towns and villages, and plundered the countryside in order to feed his vast troops. By this time, he was followed by forty thousand people not including his soldiers. Simon's success began worrying the Zealot factions in Jerusalem. Since they did not dare fight in open battle, they lay an ambush, capturing his wife and some of her entourage. They expected Simon to lay down his weapons in exchange for her freedom. However, Simon grew very angry, went to Jerusalem and took everybody leaving the city captive. Some he tortured, some he killed and he cut off the hands of others, sending them back into the city with the message that he would do likewise to all Jerusalem if his wife was not released. This frightened the Zealots so immensely that they eventually let her go.

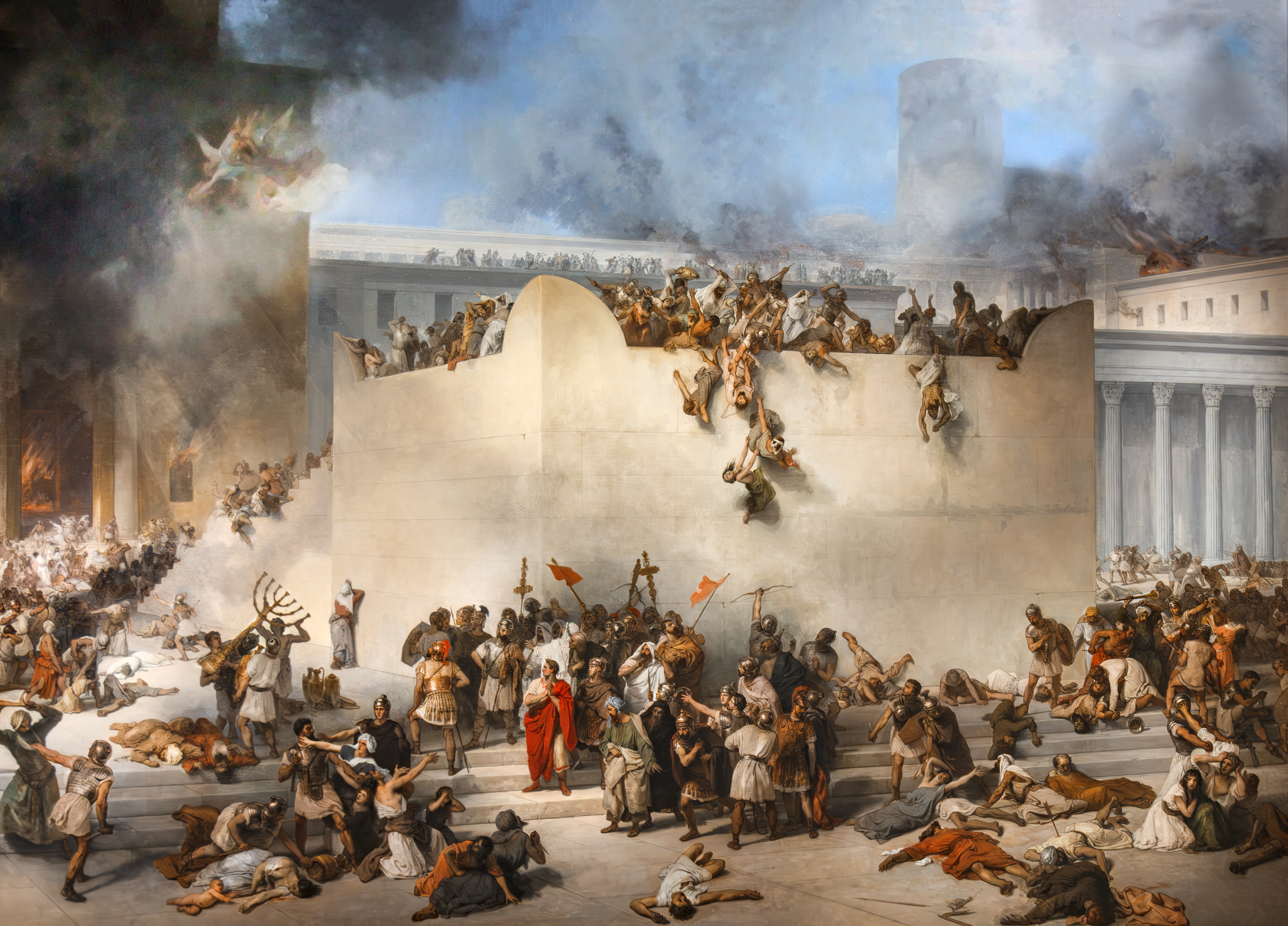
The Destruction of the Temple of Jerusalem by Francesco Hayez depicts the destruction of the Second Temple by Roman soldiers. Oil on canvas, 1867.

In the spring 69 CE, the advancing Roman army forced Simon ben Giora to retreat to Jerusalem. Within Jerusalem, John of Giscala had set himself up as a despotic ruler after overthrowing lawful authority of the Judean provisional government in the Zealot Temple Siege. In order to get rid of him, the remaining Jerusalem authorities decided to invite Simon to enter the city and to drive John away. Acclaimed by the people as their savior and guardian, Simon was admitted. Simon, with fifteen thousand soldiers at hand, soon controlled the whole upper city and some of the lower city, setting up his place of residence in the tower of Phasael. John held parts of the lower city and the Temple's outer court with six thousand men and a third splinter group of twenty-four hundred men controlled the temple's inner court.

Within the city, factions fought vigorously over the control of Jerusalem, always trying to destroy each other's grain stores to starve each other into submission. This internal fighting later proved disastrous: not only was this a sabbatical year (with less grain available), but the city was under siege by the time the harvest began. Of the leaders of the rebellion, Simon in particular was regarded as a ruthless leader, who eventually ordered the execution of the High Priest Matthias ben Boethus and three of his sons, thinking that they were on the side of the Romans. The historian Josephus wrote that "Simon was a greater terror to the people than the Romans themselves." Cassius Dio describes him as the "leader" (archon) of the Judeans.

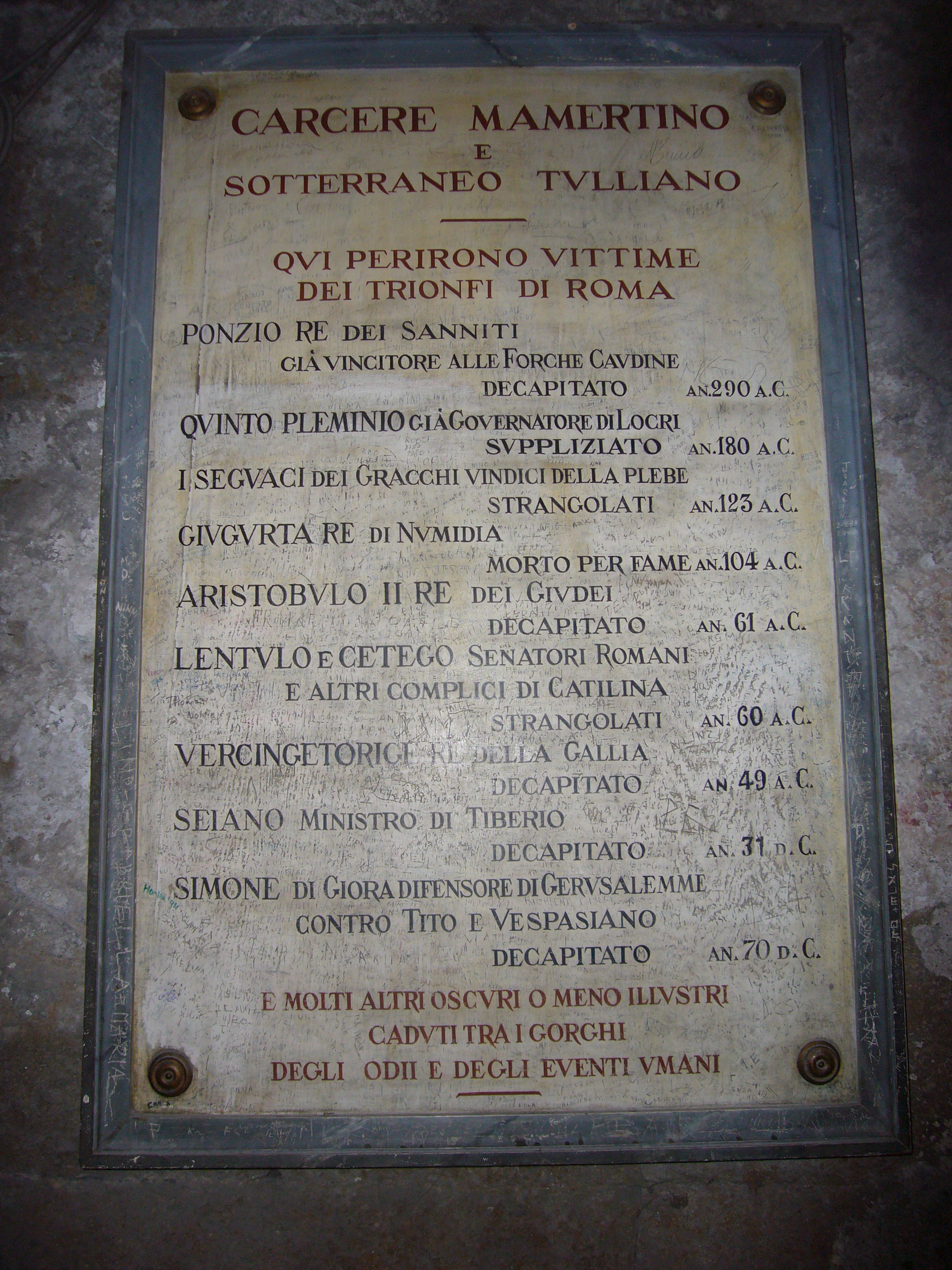
Gravestone in Mamertine Prison, with the names of illustrious prisoners who were locked up, awaiting execution. Among them, Simon bar Giora

Just before Passover in 70, Titus began the siege of Jerusalem. He quickly took down the first and second wall, but then met fierce resistance as the rebel Judean factions within Jerusalem realized the necessity of joining forces. However, Simon and John both upheld their reigns of terror over the citizens, causing many to flee to the Romans. To counteract these desertions, Simon put every potential betrayer, including some of his previous friends, to death. In August 70, five months after the siege began, Jerusalem fell to Titus. Simon escaped into the subterranean passages of the Temple Mount. By means of stone cutters he tried to dig a way to freedom, but ran out of food before he could finish. Clothed in the garments of a Judean king he rose out of the ground at the very spot where the Temple had stood, was taken prisoner and brought to Rome, where he was imprisoned in Mamertine Prison.

Like kings of other countries Simon was paraded through the streets of Rome in chains during the triumphal procession, tortured, then executed in the Forum near the Temple of Jupiter.

== See also ==
- Bar-Giora (organization)

== Bibliography ==
- Avi-Yonah, Michael (1976). Gazetteer of Roman Palestine. QEDEM 5. Institute of Archaeology, Hebrew University of Jerusalem.
- Finkelstein, Israel; Lederman, Zvi, eds. (1997). Highlands of many cultures. Tel Aviv: Institute of Archaeology of Tel Aviv University Publications Section. ISBN 965-440-007-3.
- Josephus (1737) [75]. "Wars of the Jews". The Genuine Works of Flavius Josephus the Jewish Historian. Translated by Whiston, William. London.
- Maier, Paul L., ed. (1988). Josephus: The Essential Writings. Grand Rapids: Kregel. p. 340.
- Tsafrir, Yoram; Di Segni, Leah; Green, Judith (1994). (TIR): Tabula Imperii Romani: Judaea, Palaestina. Jerusalem: Israel Academy of Sciences and Humanities. ISBN 965-208-107-8.
- Witherington, Ben III (2001). New Testament History: A Narrative Account. Grand Rapids: Baker Book.
