= Gaius Licinius Mucianus =

Roman writer, politician and soldier

Gaius Licinius Mucianus (fl. 1st century AD) was a Roman general, statesman and writer. He is considered to have played a role behind the scenes in the elevation of Vespasian to the throne.

== Life ==
His name shows that he had passed by adoption from the gens Mucia to the gens Licinia. Mucianus was sent by Claudius to Armenia with Gnaeus Domitius Corbulo. He was a suffect consul during the reign of Nero, most likely in the year 63 or 64.

Mucianus served as governor of Syria in 67 AD. There he encountered the future emperor Vespasian, who had been sent to Judaea in 66 AD to put down the Jewish revolt. The two were initially on bad terms, but the feud was resolved by the beginning of 69. In this year the emperor Galba was deposed by Otho. Mucianus and Vespasian both swore allegiance to Otho, who was overthown in turn by Vitellius; in May or June 69 the commanders held a meeting at Mount Carmel, and Mucianus persuaded Vespasian to take up arms against the new emperor.

At a subsequent council of war held in July at Berytus, it was agreed that Vespasian should stay behind to settle affairs in the East, while Mucianus marched on Italy with an army consisting of Legio VI Ferrata and vexillationes of 2,600 drawn from each of the other five legions in Syria and Judea. Mucianus expected to supplement this relatively small force, first from the legions stationed in the Balkans, then from dissident former praetorians who had supported Otho, before confronting the army which Vitellius had sent into northern Italy. However, Marcus Antonius Primus, who had simultaneously revolted against Vitellius, reached Italy before Mucianus and defeated the enemy forces arrayed there. Primus's large-scale removal of troops left Moesia vulnerable, and Mucianus was obliged to defend the province from an invading army of Dacians. Mucianus reached Rome the day after the death of Vitellius and governed the city until Vespasian arrived, although affairs were nominally in the hands of Vespasian's son Domitian.

Mucianus never wavered in his allegiance to Vespasian, whose favor he retained in spite of his arrogance. He is mentioned in the records of the Arval Brethren in the year 70; Mucianus may have been admitted following Vespasian's entrance to Rome, although Ronald Syme admits that he may have been co-opted in absentia by Galba. He was appointed consul (suffect) for the third time in 72. As no mention is made of Mucianus during the reigns of Titus or Domitian, he probably died during the reign of Vespasian; Syme believes his death happened before 78.

== Character ==
Tacitus describes the character of Mucianus as follows:

"He was a curious mix of self-indulgence and energy, courtesy and arrogance, good and evil. Excessively self-indulgent in his spare time, yet he showed remarkable qualities when actively employed on a task. In public you would praise him, but his private life was criticised. Yet by a subtle gift for intrigue he exercised great influence on his subordinates, associates and colleagues, and was the sort of man who found it more congenial to make an emperor than to be one."

== Writings ==
A clever writer and historian, Mucianus collected the speeches and letters of Romans of the older republican period, probably including a corpus of proceedings of the Senate (res gesta senatus). He was also the author of a memoir, chiefly dealing with the natural history and geography of the East, a text often quoted by Pliny as the source of miraculous occurrences.

== See also ==
- Licinia gens
- Mucia gens

Political offices
Preceded by Gaius Laecanius Bassus; Marcus Licinius Crassus Frugi as suffecti	Roman consul 64 (suffect) with Quintus Fabius Barbarus Antonius Macer	Succeeded by Aulus Licinius Nerva Silianus; Marcus Julius Vestinus Atticus as ordinary consuls
Preceded by Vespasian II; Titus as ordinary consuls	Roman consul 70 (suffect) with Quintus Petillius Cerialis	Succeeded by Q. Julius Cordinus G. Rutilius Gallicus, and ignotus as suffecti
Preceded by Vespasian IV; Titus II as ordinary consuls	Roman consul 72 (suffect) with Titus Flavius Sabinus II	Succeeded by Marcus Ulpius Traianus as suffect
