= Gaius Cestius Gallus (governor of Syria) =

1st century AD Roman senator and general

Gaius Cestius Gallus (died AD 67) was a Roman senator and general who was active during the Principate. He was suffect consul for the second nundinium of the year 42 as the colleague of Gaius Caecina Largus. Gallus was the son of Gaius Cestius Gallus, ordinary consul in 35.

== Governor of Syria ==
Gallus was legate of Syria from 63 to 65. He marched into Judaea with a force of over 30,000 men in September 66 in an attempt to restore order at the outset of the First Jewish–Roman War. As assembled at Antioch, Gallus's army comprised Legio XII Fulminata, detachments from the three other legions based in Syria, six cohorts of auxiliary infantry, and four alae of cavalry. These regular troops were supported by 14,000 allies provided by Agrippa II and other client rulers.

== Jewish Revolt ==
With his force reduced by detachments sent to occupy Galilee and the Judean coast, Gallus turned inland to subdue Jerusalem. After suffering losses amongst his baggage train and rearguard, Gallus reached Mount Scopus and penetrated the outer city, but was unable to take the Temple Mount. After a siege of nine days, Gallus decided to fall back to the coast. His decision appears to have been based on the loss of siege equipment by ambush and the threatened cutting of his supply lines as the October rains began.

The warlike faction in Jerusalem, under Shimon bar Giora, rose up against the Roman contingent, pursuing them as far as Antipatris, via Bethoron.

Josephus initially estimated the number of Roman losses at 515, but in the ensuing rout, the dead among the Imperial Roman army numbered 5,300 infantrymen and 380 cavalrymen. This incident befell the Roman army in the lunar month of Heshvan, during the 12th year of the reign of Nero, and marked the beginning of the war with Rome.

== Death ==
Soon after his return to Syria, and before the spring of 67, Gallus died. According to Josephus Flavius the legate was broken by shame at a major and unexpected Roman defeat. Gallus was succeeded in the governorship of Syria by Licinius Mucianus. Emperor Nero appointed the future Emperor Vespasian as commander of the Roman forces assembled in the province to crush the rebellion in Judaea.

== See also ==
- Cestia gens

Political offices
Preceded by Claudius	Roman consul 42 (suffect) with Gaius Caecina Largus	Succeeded by Cornelius Lupus as suffect
