= First Jewish–Roman War =

Rebellion against Roman rule (66–73/74 CE)

- Part of the Jewish–Roman wars
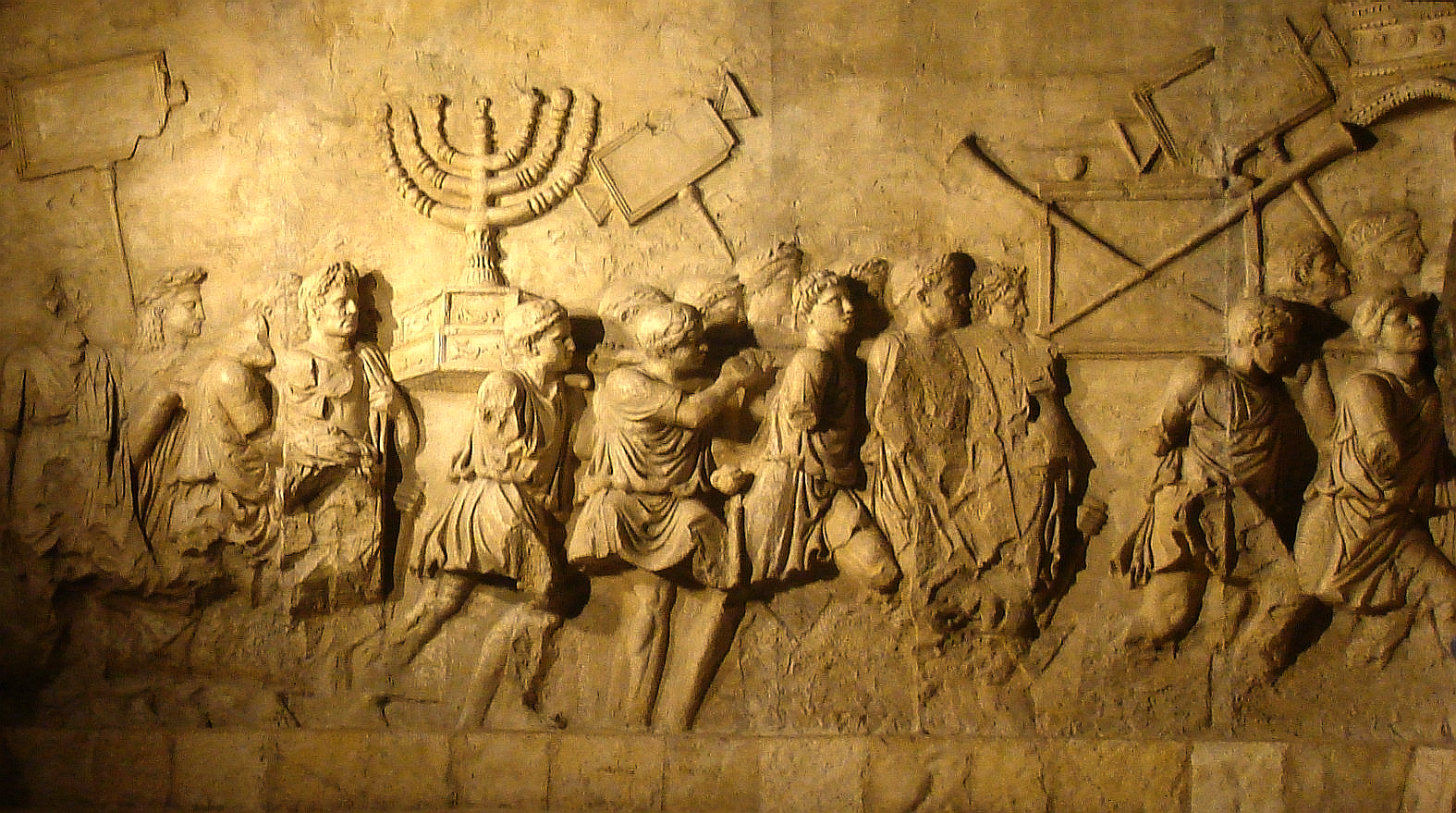
- Relief on the Arch of Titus depicting the Temple spoils carried during the triumph procession of 71 CE
| Date | 66–73/74 CE |
| Location | Judaea (Roman province) |
| Result | Roman victory |

Belligerents
| Roman Empire | Judean provisional government Supported by: Adiabene | Zealots; Galileans; Peasantry faction Idumaeans (Note: Fought alongside the Zealots and Galileans during the coup of 68 AD; some later joined Simeon bar Giora during the events of 69–70 AD.); Sicarii |

Commanders and leaders
| Gessius Florus (66); Cestius Gallus (66); Vespasian (67–69); Titus (67–71); Lucilius Bassus (71–72); Flavius Silva (72–73/74); Herod Agrippa II | Ananus ben Ananus †; Joshua ben Gamla †; Joseph ben Gurion †; Niger the Perean †; Josephus (surrendered) | Eleazar ben Simon †; Eleazar ben Hanania †; Judah ben Ari †; John of Giscala (POW); Simon bar Giora (executed); Jacob ben Sosa; Menahem ben Judah (executed); Eleazar ben Ya'ir † |

Strength
| Gallus' force: 29,548 (66); Vespasian's force: 60,000 (67–69); Titus's force: 50,000 (69–70); Silva's force: 8,000 troops (74) | Unknown | Unknown |
- According to Josephus, 1.1 million died in Jerusalem and 100,000 in Galilee.; According to modern analysis, a significant part of Judaea's population died, possibly one-quarter. Josephus's figure of 97,000 enslaved individuals is accepted by multiple scholars.

The First Jewish–Roman War (66–73/74 CE), also known as the War of Destruction, the Great Jewish Revolt, (Note: Alternatively, simply the "Great Revolt"; Hebrew: המרד הגדול, romanized: ha-Mered Ha-Gadol) the First Jewish Revolt, or the Jewish War, (Note: Latin: Bellum Iudaicum) was the first of three major Jewish rebellions against the Roman Empire. Fought in the province of Judaea, it resulted in the destruction of Jerusalem and the Jewish Temple, mass displacement, land appropriation, and the dissolution of the Jewish polity.

Judaea, once independent under the Hasmoneans, fell to the Roman Republic in the first century BCE. Initially a client kingdom, it later became a directly ruled province, marked by the rule of oppressive governors, socioeconomic divides, and rising religious and ethnic tensions. In 66 CE, under Nero, unrest flared when a local Greek sacrificed a bird at the entrance of a Caesarea synagogue. Tensions escalated as Governor Gessius Florus looted the temple treasury and massacred Jerusalem's residents, sparking an uprising during which rebels killed the Roman garrison while pro-Roman officials fled.

To quell the unrest, Cestius Gallus, the governor of Syria, invaded Judaea but was defeated at Bethoron and a provisional government, led by Ananus ben Ananus, was established in Jerusalem. In 67 CE, Vespasian was sent to suppress the revolt, invading Galilee and capturing Yodfat, Tarichaea, and Gamla. As rebels and refugees fled to Jerusalem, the government was overthrown, and the city fell into what eventually became a three-way factional war between Eleazar ben Simon, John of Gischala and Simon bar Giora. After Vespasian subdued most of the province, the chaos following Nero's death led legions to proclaim him emperor, prompting his departure for Rome. His son Titus led the siege of Jerusalem, which fell in the summer of 70, as Roman forces destroyed the Temple and razed the city. In 71, Titus and Vespasian celebrated a triumph in Rome, and Legio X Fretensis remained in Judaea to suppress the last pockets of resistance, culminating in the fall of Masada in 73/74.

The war had profound consequences for the Jewish people, many being killed, displaced, or sold into slavery. The rabbinic sages emerged as leading figures and established a rabbinic center in Yavneh, marking a key moment in the development of Rabbinic Judaism as it adapted to the post-Temple reality. These events in Jewish history signify the transition from the Second Temple period to the Rabbinic period. The revolt also hastened the separation between Christianity and Judaism. The victory strengthened the new Flavian dynasty, which commemorated it through monumental constructions and coinage, imposed a punitive tax on all Jews, and increased military presence in the region. The Jewish–Roman wars culminated in the Bar Kokhba Revolt (132–136), the last major attempt to restore Jewish independence, which resulted in even more catastrophic consequences.

== Ante bellum ==
=== Judaea under the Romans ===
In 63 BCE, the kingdom of Judaea was conquered by the Roman Republic, ending Jewish independence under the Hasmonean dynasty. Roman general Pompey intervened in a succession war between two brothers, Hyrcanus and Aristobolus. After capturing Jerusalem, Pompey entered the Temple's Holy of Holies; this was an act of desecration as only the High Priest was permitted to enter. The Jewish monarchy was abolished, Hyrcanus was appointed to serve exclusively as High Priest, and parts of the kingdom were transferred to Hellenistic cities or to the Roman province of Syria.

In 40 BCE, Antigonus II Mattathias, Aristobolus' son, briefly regained the throne with Parthian support becoming the last Hasmonean king. He was deposed in 37 BCE by Herod, who had been appointed "King of the Jews" by the Roman Senate. Herod ruled Judaea as a client kingdom. Although he succeeded in preserving a measure of autonomy, his heavy taxation, harsh repression—including executions of family members—and control over Jewish institutions fostered deep resentment. After Herod's death in 4 BCE, his realm was divided among his sons: Archelaus served as ethnarch of Judea, Samaria, and Idumaea, and Herod Antipas governed Galilee and Perea. Archelaus's misrule led to his deposition in 6 CE, and the Roman Empire annexed his territories as the province of Judaea.

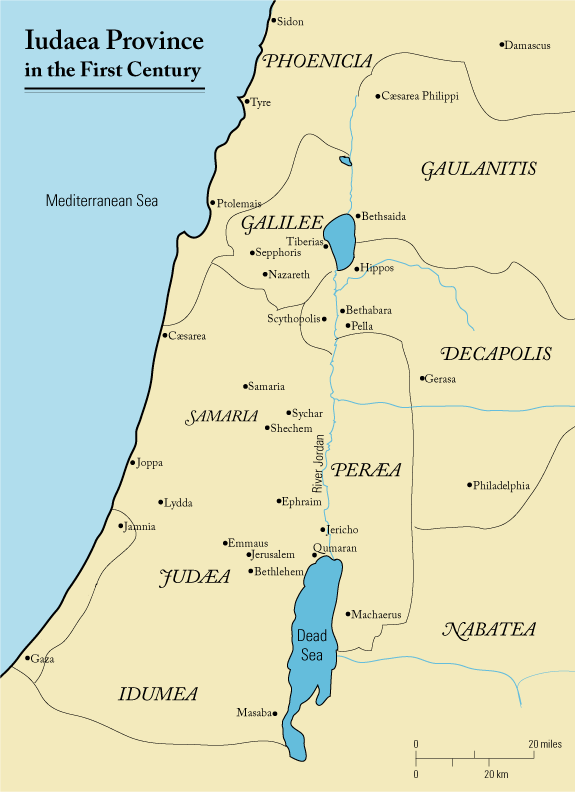
Judaea in the first century CE

In the following decades, Jewish–Roman relations in Judaea faced repeated crises. With the onset of direct Roman rule, the census of Quirinius, instituted by the governor of Syria, triggered an uprising led by Judas of Galilee. Judas led the "fourth philosophy", a movement that recognized God as the only king and rejected foreign rule. During the governorship of Pontius Pilate (r. 26 – 36 CE), incidents such as the introduction of Roman military standards (emblems of the army) into Jerusalem, the diversion of Temple funds for an aqueduct, and a soldier's indecent exposure near the Temple provoked unrest and bloodshed. Conflicts escalated during pilgrim festivals, as the influx of worshippers often fueled nationalistic sentiments.

Under Emperor Caligula's reign (37–41 CE), imperial policy in Judaea briefly broke with earlier, more tolerant practice: his efforts to impose the imperial cult provoked crises and helped fuel anti-Jewish sentiment, leading to violent outbreaks in Alexandria, Egypt, in 38 CE. Tensions further escalated following a dispute at Yavneh (Jamnia), where the Jewish community dismantled a pagan altar. In response, Caligula ordered a statue of himself to be placed in the Temple, provoking widespread outrage. His death averted open conflict, but the episode further deepened Jewish resentment toward Roman rule.

In 41 CE, with the support of Emperor Claudius, Herod Agrippa became the client king of Judaea, unifying the territories once ruled by his grandfather, Herod. This briefly restored Jewish self-governance, but after Agrippa's death in 44, Judaea reverted to direct Roman rule, expanding to include Judea, Samaria, Idumaea, Galilee, and Perea. His son, Agrippa II, ruled Chalcis and oversaw the Temple, including appointing and removing High Priests.

Judaea was initially stable under restored Roman rule but soon fell into disorder. Around 48, the Romans crucified Jacob and Simon, sons of Judas of Galilee. Clashes erupted between Jews and Samaritans, and by the early 50s, the Sicarii (a group of Jewish radicals) began exploiting pilgrim festivals in Jerusalem for assassinations and intimidation. They also targeted rural landowners, destroying property to deter cooperation with Rome. Religious fanaticism grew, inspiring figures like Theudas, who claimed he would miraculously part the Jordan River but was executed by governor Fadus, and "The Egyptian", whose followers were dispersed by Antonius Felix.

In 64, Gessius Florus became governor, securing the position through his wife, who was a friend of Poppaea Sabina, the wife of Emperor Nero. His ties to the imperial family gave him considerable freedom in governance. The Roman historian Tacitus described him as unfit for office, and Josephus—a Jewish commander who became a historian after his capture by the Romans—portrayed him as a ruthless official who plundered the region and imposed harsh punishments. The worsening situation under Florus led many to flee the region.

=== Causes and motivations ===
Most scholars regard the Jewish War as a prime example of ancient Jewish nationalism. The revolt was driven by the pursuit of freedom, the removal of Roman control, and the establishment of an independent Jewish state. Aspiration for independence grew following Herod's death and particularly after the establishment of direct imperial rule. This desire was partially fueled by the legacy of the successful Maccabean revolt against the Seleucids, which fostered the belief that a similar victory over Rome could be achievable. The Hasmonean-led Jewish state strengthened Jewish nationalistic awareness and aspirations for independence. Historian David Goodblatt pointed to similarities between the rebels' actions and ideology and those of modern national liberation movements, citing the rebels' struggle to free Judaea, their minting of coins inscribed with "Israel", and their adoption of a new symbolic era, called the "freedom of Israel," as examples.

Jewish discontent was fueled by the harsh suppression of unrest and widespread perception of Roman rule as oppressive. Many Roman officials were corrupt, brutal, or inept, fueling unrest even under competent governors. Florus's governorship is described by ancient sources as the tipping point that sparked the revolt. Tacitus attributed the war to Roman misgovernance rather than Jewish rebelliousness; he noted that Jews showed restraint under harsh governors but lost patience due to Florus' actions. Josephus wrote that the Jews preferred to die in battle rather than endure prolonged suffering under Florus' governance.

The concept of "zeal"—a total commitment to God's will and law, rooted in figures like Phinehas, Elijah, and Mattathias, and driven by a belief in Israel's election—is often seen as a key driver of the revolt. Though Eleazar ben Simon's faction was the only one to explicitly call itself "Zealots", historian Martin Hengel maintained that all factions rejecting foreign rule in the name of God's sole sovereignty could rightfully be included under this designation. Hengel traced this view to the intensification of concepts found in the Torah (first part of the Hebrew Bible and Judaism's central text), such as God's kingship. This ideology resurfaced in the revolt, especially among the Sicarii. Judaic scholar Philip Alexander also described the Zealots as a coalition of factions, united by a shared form of nationalism and the goal of liberating Israel by force.

Historian Jonathan Price wrote that apocalyptic beliefs played a role in fueling the revolt, many rebels envisioning a divinely sanctioned cosmic struggle inspired by prophetic texts, such as the Book of Daniel, which foretold the fall of the fourth imperial power, which some Jews believed was Rome. Historian Tessa Rajak asserted that there is no evidence to suggest the insurgents were driven by messianic or end-of-days aspirations.

Marxist scholars, notably Heinz Kreißig, interpreted the revolt as a class struggle between social strata, and the burning of debt records by the rebels is often cited as proof of socio-economic motives. Critics argue this view to be a case of political theory being held over evidence. Such is the case for Price, who noted there is little evidence of economic grievances; he sees the burning of debt records as a tactic for popular support, not ideology. Classicist Guy McLean Rogers wrote that debt was routine and neither a key cause nor a unifying rallying point for the rebels. Price also argued that rebel leaders lacked "class loyalty": Simon bar Giora did free slaves and target the wealthy, but he also had aristocratic support, whereas other leaders lacked any social agenda.

Historian Uriel Rappaport wrote that hostility between Jews and surrounding Greek cities was the decisive factor that made the revolt inevitable, as Rome failed to address the tensions. The provincial Roman garrison was mainly drawn from Hellenistic cities, while Greek-speaking eastern provincials held key administrative roles, heightening tensions. Historian Martin Goodman counter-argued that since Jews had chosen to live in Greek cities, deep hostility was not a long-standing issue, and the ethnic violence that erupted in these cities in 66 was a consequence of rising tensions rather than the root cause of the revolt. Goodman attributes the causes of the revolt to the inability of the local elite to address economic and societal discontent, such failure being linked to their lack of legitimacy as their authority depended on the Herodians and Romans, both of whom were often despised by the populace; he also argued that elite involvement made Rome view the uprising as a full rebellion and deepened divisions within the rebel state.

== Initial stages of war ==
=== Outbreak of the rebellion ===
In May 66, violence erupted in the city of Caesarea over a land dispute. Local Jews sought to buy land beside their synagogue from its Greek owner, but despite offering well above its value, he refused and built workshops that blocked access to the synagogue. Some young Jews tried to stop the construction, but Florus suppressed their actions. Prominent Jews then paid Florus a bribe of eight talents to halt the work, (Note: Equivalent to more than a century's wages for a skilled laborer.) but after taking the money he failed to intervene. On Shabbat, Judaism's weekly day of rest, a Greek desecrated the synagogue by sacrificing birds at the entrance, sparking violence between the communities. (Note: By sacrificing the birds on an upturned pot, the Greek appears to have inverted the purification ritual prescribed in Jewish law for a cleansed leper (a bird sacrifice in an earthenware vessel), while alluding to the classical-era antisemitic distortion of the Exodus, portraying the liberation of the Jewish people from slavery in Egypt as the expulsion of lepers.) A Roman cavalry commander tried but failed to stop the violence, and when Jewish leaders complained to Florus, he had them arrested.

Afterwards, Florus arrived in Jerusalem and seized 17 talents from the Temple treasury, (Note: Rogers identifies the 17 talents taken from the Temple as silver.) claiming it was for "governmental purposes". Mass protests ensued, and crowds mocked him by passing around a basket to collect alms as if he were a beggar. When the Sanhedrin—the Jewish high court—refused to surrender the offenders, Florus had his troops sack the Upper Agora, a marketplace in Jerusalem's affluent Upper City, reportedly killing over 3,600 people. Among the victims were wealthy Jews of the equestrian order, who, despite being Roman citizens and exempt from such punishment, were not spared. His soldiers exceeded orders, looting and taking prisoners. Jewish princess Berenice, who was visiting the city, pleaded for restraint but was threatened by legionaries. A second massacre occurred when two cohorts (cavalry squadrons) arrived in the city. The Jews went to greet them peacefully, but were met with silence. Some, angered by this, began insulting Florus, prompting the soldiers to charge and causing a stampede toward the Antonia Fortress. Jewish fighters trapped Roman cohorts with rooftop attacks, forcing them to retreat to Herod's palace, while rebels destroyed the porticoes linking the Temple to the Antonia to block Roman access and protect the Temple treasures. Florus fled the city, leaving a cohort behind to serve as a garrison.

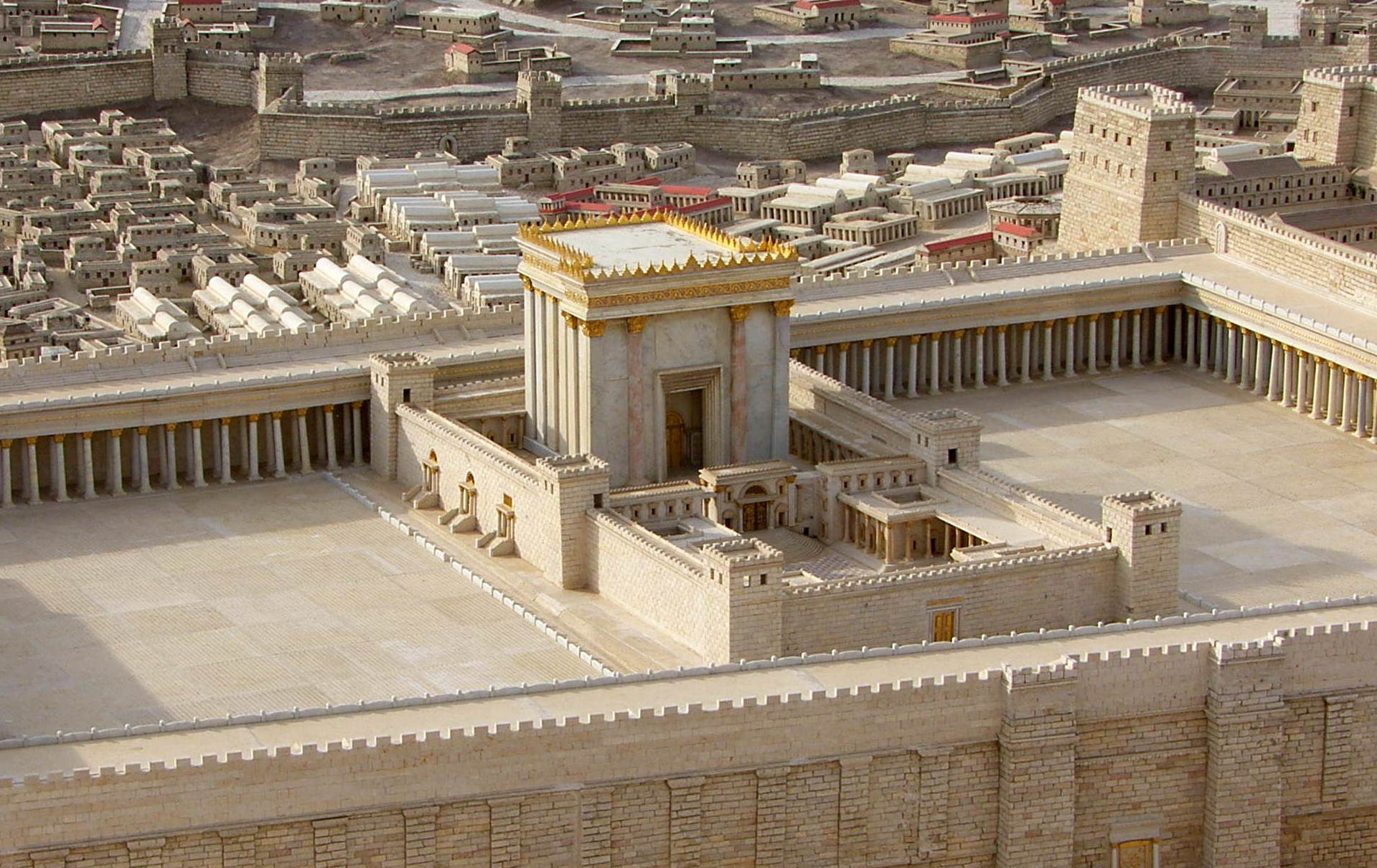
Scale model reconstruction of the Temple Mount during the first century CE, with the Second Temple in the center and the Antonia Fortress to the upper right

Agrippa II hurried from Alexandria to calm the unrest, while Cestius Gallus, the Roman governor of Syria, sent an emissary who found Jerusalem loyal to Rome but opposed to Florus. Agrippa then delivered a public speech to the people of Jerusalem alongside his sister Berenice, acknowledging the failures of Roman administration but urging restraint. He argued that a small nation could not challenge the might of the Roman Empire. At first, the crowd agreed, reaffirming allegiance to the emperor. They restored damaged structures and paid the tax owed. When he urged patience with Florus until a new governor was appointed, the crowd turned on him, forcing him and Berenice to flee the city.

Eleazar ben Hanania, the Temple's captain and son of an ex-High Priest, convinced the priests to cease accepting offerings from foreigners. This act ended the practice of offering sacrifices on behalf of Rome and its emperor, which the Romans viewed as affirmations of loyalty to imperial rule. According to Josephus, this event marked the foundation of the war. (Note: Although some historians view this act as a declaration of war on Rome, others argue it was neither directed at Rome nor intended as a declaration of war.) Around this time, a faction of Sicarii led by Menahem ben Judah, a descendant of Judas of Galilee, launched a surprise assault on the desert fortress of Masada, capturing it and killing the Roman garrison. The seized weapons were transported to Jerusalem.

After failing to pacify the rebels, Jerusalem's moderate leaders sought military assistance from Florus and Agrippa. In response, Agrippa dispatched 2,000 cavalrymen from Auranitis, Batanaea, and Trachonitis. These forces reinforced the moderates, who controlled the Upper City, while Eleazar ben Hanania's followers controlled the Lower City and Temple Mount. During the Jewish wood-gathering festival of Tu B'Av (in August), several Sicarii infiltrated the city and joined the rebellious faction. After several days of fighting, the rebels captured the Upper City, forcing the moderates to retreat into Herod's Palace, while others fled or went into hiding. They burned the house of ex-High Priest Ananias, the royal palaces, and the public archives, where debt records were kept, likely to win support from Jerusalem's poor.

The rebels then captured the Antonia Fortress, seizing artillery and massacring the Roman garrison. With reinforcements from the Sicarii, they captured Herod's Palace, then agreed to a ceasefire with the moderates, but refused to make peace with the Roman soldiers. The Romans retreated to the towers of Phasael, Hippicus, and Mariamne, where they held out for eleven more days. During this time, the Sicarii captured and killed Ananias and his brother. In mid-September, the besieged soldiers surrendered for safe passage, but the rebels killed them all except commander Metilius, who pledged to convert to Judaism and undergo circumcision. Menahem appeared in royal attire in public, but he was soon captured, tortured, and executed by Eleazar ben Hanania's faction; many of his Sicarii followers were killed or scattered. Others, including Menahem's relative Eleazar ben Yair, withdrew to Masada.

Ethnic violence spread across the region. Around the time of the garrison massacre, according to Josephus, non-Jews in Caesarea carried out an ethnic cleansing, killing about 20,000 Jews. The survivors were arrested by Florus. Hundreds of Jews were reportedly killed in Ascalon and Akko-Ptolemais; in Tyre, Hippos, and Gadara, many were executed or imprisoned. The Jews of Scythopolis initially assisted their fellow townspeople in defending the city from Jewish attackers. However, they were later relocated with their families to a grove outside the town, where they were killed by those who had fought alongside them. In Antioch, Sidon, and Apamea, the local residents spared the Jewish communities, and in Gerasa, they even escorted those who chose to leave all the way to the city's border. Upon hearing of the massacre of Jews in Caesarea, Jewish groups launched attacks on nearby villages and cities, especially in the Decapolis, including Philadelphia, Heshbon, Gerasa and Pella. (Note: According to Guy McLean Rogers, these cities were likely targeted due to their Greek or Macedonian origins and cultural influence, though some had Jewish residents as a result of the conquests of Hasmonean king Alexander Jannaeus in the first century BCE.) Cedasa, Hippos, Akko-Ptolemais, Gaba, and Caesarea were also targeted. Archaeological evidence confirms destruction in Gerasa and Gadara. Josephus also describes Sebaste, Ashkelon, Anthedon, and Gaza as destroyed by fire, although this may be an exaggeration.

Violence also broke out in Alexandria when Greeks attacked Jews, capturing some alive and provoking retaliation. Roman governor Tiberius Julius Alexander—a Jew who had renounced his ancestral tradition—attempted mediation but failed, and his troops killed tens of thousands of Jews. In Judaea, Jewish forces seized the fortresses of Cypros near Jericho and Machaerus in Perea.

=== Gallus' campaign and defeat ===
At this point, Gallus marched from Antioch to Judaea with Legio XII Fulminata, 2,000 troops from each of Syria's three other legions, six infantry cohorts, and four cavalry units. Vassal kings Antiochus IV of Commagene, Agrippa II, and Sohaemus of Emesa sent thousands of cavalry and infantry to reinforce his army. Irregular forces from cities like Berytus, driven by anti-Jewish sentiment, were also recruited.

From his base in Akko-Ptolemais, Gallus launched a campaign in Galilee, burning Chabulon and nearby villages before marching to Caesarea. His forces captured Jaffa, killed its people, and torched the city. Cavalry units were also dispatched to ravage the toparchy (district) of Narbata (possibly Khirbet el-Hammam), near Caesarea. The residents of Sepphoris welcomed the Romans and pledged their support. Gallus then advanced toward Jerusalem, leaving destruction in his wake. The town of Lydda, largely deserted as most residents had gone to Jerusalem for the religious festival of Sukkot (around September–October), was destroyed, and those who remained were killed. As the army continued through Bethoron and Gabaon, it was ambushed by Jewish forces, suffering heavy losses. Among the Jewish fighters were Niger the Perean Simon bar Giora, and Adiabenian princes Monobazus and Candaios. Agrippa made a final attempt at peace, but failed.

In late Tishrei (September/October), Gallus encamped on Mount Scopus overlooking Jerusalem. This drove the rebels into the inner city and Temple complex. Upon entering, Gallus set fire to the Bezetha district and Timber Market to intimidate the population. For unclear reasons, he lifted the siege and retreated. Josephus suggested that Gallus could have captured the city with more determination. Historian Menahem Stern suggested that Gallus, facing strong resistance, doubted he could seize the city. Historian E. Mary Smallwood proposed that Gallus may have been concerned about the approaching winter, lack of siege equipment, the risk of ambushes in the hills, and the potential insincerity of the moderates' offer to open the gates.

Gallus' retreat turned into a rout, resulting in the loss of 5,300 infantry and 480 cavalry. At the steep, narrow Bethoron pass, the Roman force fell into an ambush by archers positioned on the surrounding cliffs. Some escaped under cover of darkness but at the cost of hundreds of men. Pursued to Antipatris, the Roman forces abandoned supplies, including artillery and battering rams, which the rebels seized. Suetonius claimed the Romans lost their legionary eagle. Gallus died soon after, possibly by suicide. Scholars note the rarity of this defeat as a decisive Roman loss in a provincial uprising.

The unexpected victory boosted pro-revolt factions, increasing their confidence, and many others were swept up in the enthusiasm. Some elite moderates fled to the Romans; others stayed and joined the rebels. Among those fleeing were Costobar and Saul, members of the Herodian royalty, as well as Philip, son of Iacimus, the prefect of Agrippa's army. Around the same time, a pogrom broke out in Damascus. The city's men, fearing betrayal by their wives who had converted to Judaism, locked the Jewish population in a gymnasium and, according to Josephus, killed thousands within hours.

=== Judean provisional government ===
A coin issued by the rebels in 68, using the Paleo-Hebrew alphabet. Obverse: "Shekel, Israel. Year 3." Reverse: "Jerusalem the Holy"

After Gallus' defeat, a popular assembly convened at the Jerusalem Temple and established a provisional government. Ananus ben Ananus, a former High Priest, (Note: Josephus reports that Ananus, exploiting the gap between Roman governors, illegally convened the Sanhedrin to issue a capital verdict against James, the brother of Jesus, who was then stoned. Because such trials required both royal and Roman authorization, Jerusalem's leading citizens protested to Agrippa II and informed governor Lucceius Albinus, who rebuked Ananus for acting without his approval. Consequently, Agrippa deposed him.) was appointed as one of its leaders alongside Joseph ben Gurion, a Pharisee, and other members of the city's priestly elite, including Joshua ben Gamla. The new government divided the country into military districts. Josephus was appointed commander of Galilee and Gaulanitis, (Note: At the time, Josephus was a 30-year-old priest and had no prior military experience.) while Joseph ben Shimon commanded Jericho. John the Essene led the districts of Jaffa, Lydda, Emmaus, and Thamna, and Eleazar ben Ananias and Jesus ben Sappha oversaw Idumaea, with Niger the Perean, a hero of the Gallus campaign, under their command. Menasseh commanded Perea in Transjordan, and John ben Ananias was tasked with Gophna and Acrabetta. Eleazar ben Simon, who had played a role in Gallus' defeat and seized large amounts of money and spoils, was denied any formal position. Simon bar Giora, another leading figure in the victory over Gallus, was likewise overlooked. Citing the exclusion of the Zealots, scholars such as Richard Horsley argued that the government may have only feigned support for the revolt, instead seeking a compromise with Rome.

Following the Temple meeting, Jerusalem's priestly leadership began minting coins—an assertion of financial autonomy and rejection of foreign rule. The coins bore Hebrew inscriptions with slogans like "Jerusalem the Holy" and "For the Freedom of Zion", later changed in the fourth year to "For the Redemption of Zion". Dated using a new revolutionary calendar (years one to five), they marked the start of a new era of independence. The silver coins—the first of their kind in Jewish history—were labeled as the "shekel of Israel", "Israel" possibly denoting the state's name. Their denominations (shekel, half-shekel, quarter-shekel) revived the biblical weight system, evoking ancient sovereignty, and the use of Hebrew symbolized Jewish nationalism and statehood.

The new government ordered the destruction of Herod Antipas' palace in Tiberias due to its display of images forbidden by Jewish law, possibly to demonstrate zeal or appease rebels. Envoys were sent to Jews in the Parthian Empire to seek support against Rome. In Jerusalem, the unfinished Third Wall protecting the northern flank was completed. With no regular army since the Hasmoneans, the government struggled to build one, as most military-age men had joined rebel factions. Rebels acquired arms by stripping the dead and captured, raiding fortresses, commissioning local blacksmiths in Jerusalem, and possibly buying from suppliers connected to the Roman army. During Hanukkah, the Jewish festival commemorating the recovery of Jerusalem in the Maccabean revolt, Niger the Perean and John the Essene led an assault on Ashkelon, a city that remained under Roman control. Two successive attacks were repelled, forcing a retreat.

The provisional government lacked broad support, and rival factions soon formed. Some rallied around distinct ideologies, others around charismatic leaders, and they turned their weapons not only against Rome but also against each other. In Galilee, John of Gischala, a wealthy olive oil trader, emerged as a key rebel leader. Initially opposed to the war, he changed his stance after his hometown Gush Halav was attacked by the people of Tyre and Gadara. Leading a group of peasants, refugees, and brigands, he became Josephus' main adversary, but failed to displace him. Meanwhile, Simon bar Giora led attacks on the wealthy in northern Judea. Expelled from Acrabetene, he fled to Masada, where rebels first distrusted but later accepted him into their raids.

== Vespasian's campaigns ==
=== Vespasian's Galilee campaign ===
After Gallus' defeat, Nero appointed Vespasian—a former consul and seasoned commander—to lead the war effort. Vespasian, a man of humble origins, was chosen—according to Suetonius—for both his military effectiveness and his obscure background, which made him a politically safe choice to suppress the revolt without posing a threat to the emperor. He traveled from Corinth to Syria, assembling Legions V Macedonica and X Fretensis, while Titus, his eldest son, marched XV Apollinaris from Alexandria to Akko-Ptolemais. The Roman force was reinforced by 23 auxiliary cohortes and six alae of cavalry, likely drawn from Syria. Local rulers, including Antiochus IV of Commagene, Agrippa II, Sohaemus of Emesa, and Malchus II of Nabatea, contributed additional infantry and cavalry.

In early summer of 67, Vespasian established his base at Akko-Ptolemais before launching an offensive on Galilee, a heavily populated Jewish region in the north of the province. Rogers estimates that the force Vespasian commanded upon his arrival numbered about 58,000 soldiers and 10,000 slaves. Josephus, who led the defense of Galilee, claimed to have recruited 100,000 young men from the region, though this figure is widely regarded as exaggerated. The people of Sepphoris—the second-largest Jewish city in the country after Jerusalem—soon surrendered and pledged loyalty to Rome. Meanwhile, Jewish forces withdrew into fortified cities and villages, forcing the Romans into prolonged sieges. The Romans captured Gabara in the first assault, Josephus reporting that all the men were killed. The town and surrounding villages were set on fire, and survivors were enslaved. Around the same time, Titus destroyed the nearby village of Iaphia, where all the men were reportedly slain and the women and children sold into slavery. Cerialis, who commanded Legio V Macedonica, was dispatched to fight a large group of Samaritans who had gathered atop Mount Gerizim, the site of their ruined temple, killing many.

Vespasian then besieged the town of Yodfat, which fell in June or July after a 47-day siege. Under Josephus's command, the defenders used several materials to absorb Roman attacks and countered with boulders and boiling oil—the earliest known use of this tactic. Arrowheads and ballista stones have been found at the site. When the city fell, the Romans massacred those outside and hunted survivors in hiding. Josephus reported 40,000 deaths, though modern research estimates around 2,000 killed and 1,200 women and infants captured. Josephus recounts that after the town's fall, he and 40 others hid in a deep pit and agreed to commit suicide by drawing lots; he was left among the last two, a scenario that later inspired the well-known "Josephus problem" in mathematics and computer science. Josephus chose to surrender rather than die, and then prophesied Vespasian's rise to emperor, prompting Vespasian to spare him. Vespasian and Titus then took a 20-day respite in Caesarea Philippi, Agrippa's capital. (Note: It is believed that it was during this episode that Titus and Berenice began their love affair. Berenice later lived in Rome as Titus' mistress, but public opposition to the foreign Jewish queen forced him to dismiss her.)

As military operations resumed, Tiberias, a Jewish-majority city in Agrippa's realm, surrendered without resistance as pro-Roman factions prevailed. The nearby Tarichaea mounted a fierce defense. According to Josephus, its residents did not originally seek war, but the influx of outsiders into the city compelled them to fight. After the town's fall, surviving rebels took to the Sea of Galilee, engaging the Romans in naval skirmishes that resulted in heavy losses for the Jews. Josephus reports 6,700 killed, leaving the lake red with blood and filled with bodies. Afterward, Vespasian separated the local prisoners from the "foreigners" blamed for instigating the revolt; the latter were forced to travel along a guarded route to Tiberias, where, in the city's stadium, 1,200 were executed. Six thousand young men were reportedly sent to work on the Corinth Canal in Greece, others were given to Agrippa II, and 30,400 were sold into slavery.

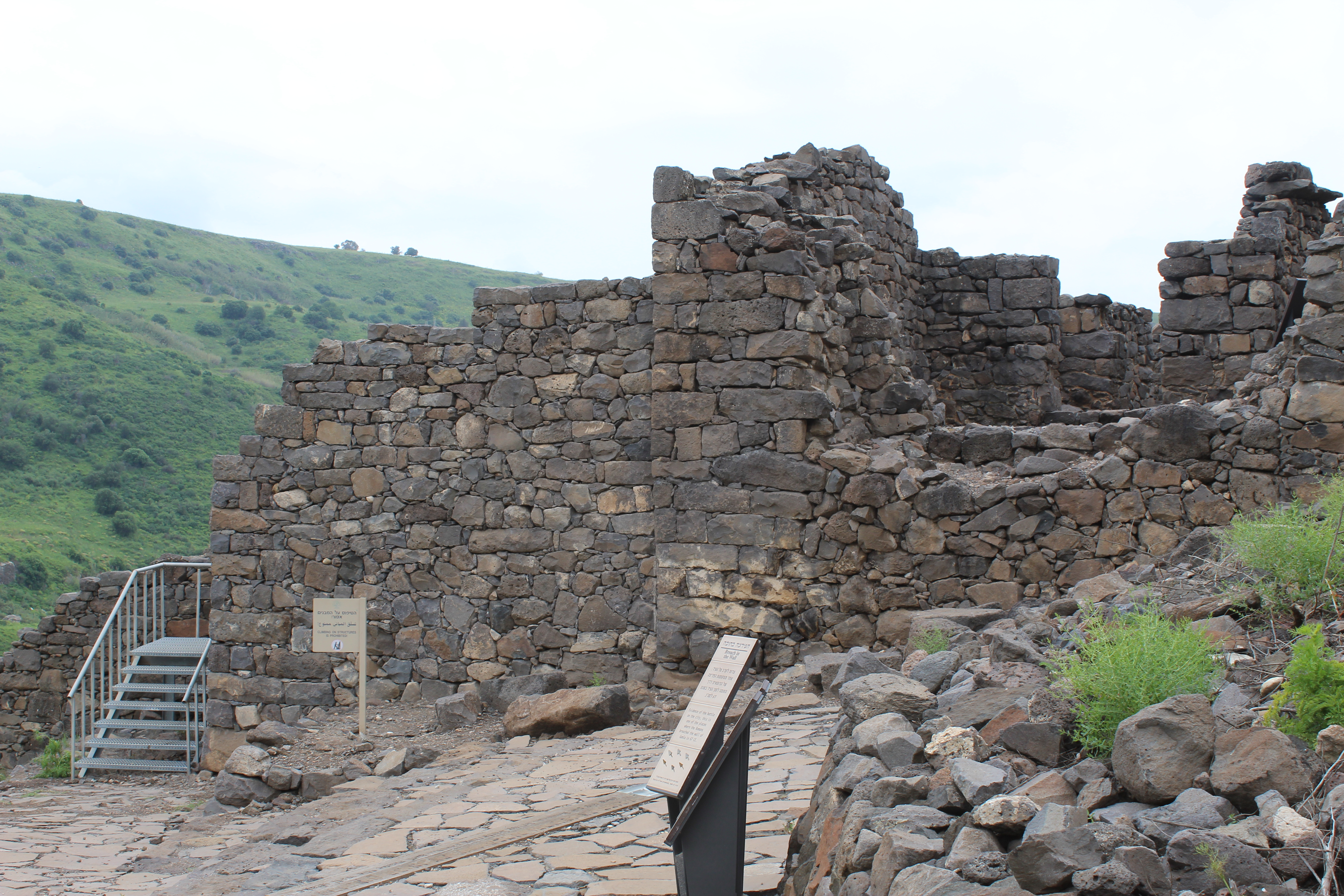
Gamla, a fortified town in the Golan, fell to Roman forces in 67 AD. The image shows the main breach in the town's wall

The next target was Gamla, a fortified city on a steep rocky promontory in the southern Golan, which Vespasian besieged for six weeks in the fall of 67. Archaeological finds at the site include pieces of armor, arrowheads and hundreds of ballista and catapult stones. Gamla's synagogue was seemingly repurposed into a refuge area, as indicated by fireplaces, cookpots, and storage jars buried under ballista stones. Despite heavy casualties, the Romans eventually seized the town in late October, and it was never resettled. According to Josephus, only two women survived; the rest either threw themselves into ravines or were killed by the Romans.

In Gush Halav, John of Gischala opened surrender talks but used a brief Shabbat respite granted by Titus to flee with his followers. Titus encamped a few miles away at Kedasa, and when he returned, the city surrendered. The Romans also captured the fortress on Mount Tabor. Another Roman force retook Jaffa, ending rebel piracy that had disrupted naval routes and grain supplies; a storm helped by destroying the rebel fleet.

=== Civil war and coup in Jerusalem ===
With the conclusion of the Galilee campaign, Jerusalem descended into chaos, overcrowded with refugees and rebels. The Zealots, led by Eleazar ben Simon and Zachariah ben Avkilus, opposed the moderate government, continuing the anti-Roman stance of Eleazar ben Hananiah. Allied with John of Gischala, who likely arrived in late 67 AD, they executed suspected collaborators, seized the Temple, and appointed Phannias ben Samuel—an unqualified villager without priestly lineage—as High Priest by lot. In response, moderate leader Ananus ben Ananus rallied popular support to confront the Zealots. Though the Zealots launched a preemptive attack, they were overpowered and forced to retreat into the Temple. Urged by John, they sent a letter to the Idumaeans, (Note: A group residing south of Judea, the Idumaeans were converted to Judaism by Hasmonean leader John Hyrcanus after their conquest in the second century BCE.) alleging that Ananus was betraying Jerusalem to Rome. The Idumaeans entered the city during a storm and, alongside the Zealots, massacred Ananus's forces and civilians alike. The Idumaeans looted the city, killed former High Priests Ananus ben Ananus and Joshua ben Gamla, and left their bodies unburied, in violation of Jewish law. Many Idumaeans later withdrew in regret; others went on to join Simon bar Giora.

Through the winter of 67/68, the Zealots consolidated their control over Jerusalem through terror, holding tribunals and murdering moderates, including Niger the Perean and Joseph ben Gurion. Upon hearing of the events from deserters, (Note: Many fled to the Romans due to personal danger and disillusionment with the rebel leadership, some escaping by paying the Zealots and their allies for passage.) Vespasian decided against marching on Jerusalem, reasoning that it was wiser to let the Jews destroy one another. In spring, during the Passover feast, the Sicarii descended from Masada and raided the wealthy village of Ein Gedi on the southwestern shore of the Dead Sea; Josephus does not clarify their motivation. They reportedly killed 700 women and children, looted homes, and seized crops before returning to the fort. Similar raids on nearby villages devastated the area and attracted new recruits.

=== Vespasian's campaign in Judea ===
While civil war raged in Jerusalem, the Romans continued their campaign. After Titus returned from Galilee to Caesarea, Vespasian advanced to Yavneh and Azotus, which were subdued and garrisoned, before he returned to Caesarea with many captives. In January 68, the leaders of Gadara in Perea sent a delegation to Vespasian to offer their surrender. As he advanced, opponents of the surrender killed a leading citizen and fled. The remaining residents dismantled the city walls, allowing Roman forces to enter and establish a garrison. Meanwhile, fugitives attempted to rally support in nearby Bethennabris, but were defeated by Roman forces. The survivors, seeking refuge in Jericho, were massacred near the Jordan River, where over 15,000 were reportedly killed, and many drowned or were captured. The Romans then captured the rest of southern Perea, capturing and garrisoning Abila, Iulias, and Besimoth, and soon controlled the entire region apart from Machaerus.

In spring 68, Vespasian systematically subdued settlements en route to Jerusalem, delaying the siege to gather supplies from the spring harvest and to let internal factions weaken. After capturing Antipatris, Vespasian advanced, burning and destroying nearby towns. He reduced the district of Thamna and resettled Lydda and Yavneh with surrendered inhabitants. By April 68, he stationed Legio V Macedonia at Emmaus. From there, he advanced to Bethleptepha, burning the area and parts of Idumaea, before capturing Betabris and Caphartoba, reportedly killing over 10,000 people and taking 1,000 prisoners. By May–June, he camped at Corea, passed through Mabartha (later Flavia Neapolis) in Samaria, and advanced to Jericho, joining the force that took Perea. Survivors had fled to Jericho, but when the Romans arrived they found it deserted, as the inhabitants had escaped to the Jerusalem Mountains. With Jericho garrisoned, the fertile Jordan Valley came under Roman control, and another garrison was installed at Adida, east of Lydda.

Vespasian then visited the Dead Sea. (Note: During his visit to the Dead Sea, Vespasian tested its buoyancy by ordering bound non-swimmers to be thrown into the water.) Archaeological evidence indicates that around this time, the Qumran community, commonly linked to the Essenes, was destroyed, with some members possibly joining the rebels at Masada. Commander Lucius Annius then captured and burned Gerasa (likely a textual error for Gezer), executing many young men, enslaving women and children, and razing nearby villages, killing those who could not flee.

Simon bar Giora gained strength outside Jerusalem, extending his influence over Judea. He plundered the wealthy, freed slaves, and promised gifts to his followers. The Zealots in Jerusalem viewed Simon's growing power as a threat and sent an army to confront him. After he defeated that force, he reached a stalemate with an Idumaean force before withdrawing to Nain, where he prepared to invade Idumaea. From his staging camp in Teqoa, he attempted to capture Herodium but failed. Later, at Alurus, an Idumaean officer betrayed his own army by returning from a reconnaissance mission with inflated reports of Simon's strength, prompting the commanders to surrender without resistance. Simon's subsequent successes, including the capture of Hebron, prompted the Zealots to lay ambushes in the mountain passes leading into Jerusalem. When they captured his wife, he retaliated by torturing captives and threatening to destroy Jerusalem's walls unless she was returned. The Zealots complied, and Simon paused his campaign.

=== Simon enters Jerusalem, and a succession war in Rome ===
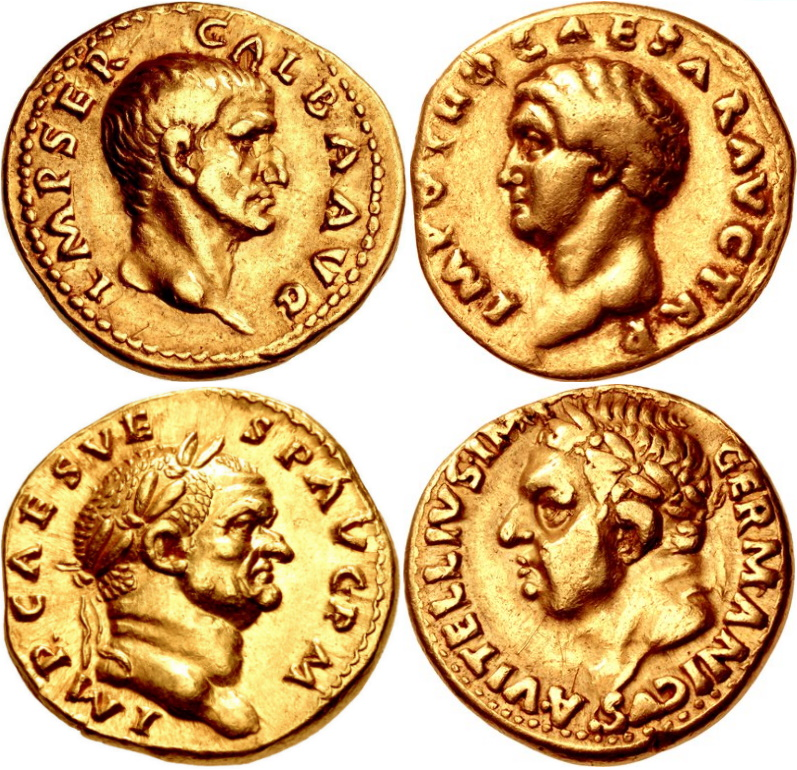
Coins from the Year of the Four Emperors. Following Nero's death in June 68, a delay of about a year occurred, during which Vespasian left Judaea to contest the imperial throne

As the war progressed, major political upheavals were taking place in Rome. In June 68, Nero fled Rome and committed suicide, sparking a war of succession known as the "Year of the Four Emperors". After only a few months in power, Emperor Galba was murdered by supporters of his rival, Otho. Meanwhile, in Jerusalem, the Galilean Zealots plundered the homes of the wealthy, murdered men, and raped women. Following this, they reportedly began to adopt the attire and behaviors of women, imitating both their ornaments and their desires, as Josephus notes, engaging in what he describes as "unlawful pleasures". (Note: This claim by Josephus has not been universally accepted by scholars. Steve Mason, for example, cites this episode as presenting John of Gischala's followers as "not real men at all," but does not comment on whether the story is historically accurate. Guy Rogers views it as part of a broader narrative strategy, though he notes that the events could still be historically grounded despite the thematic framing.) Those who fled the city were killed by Simon bar Giora and his followers outside the walls.

In April 69, the rivals of John of Gischala opened Jerusalem's gates for Simon ben Giora. Simon took control over much of the city, including the Upper City, with his base at the Phasael Tower, much of the Lower City, and the northern suburbs. He failed to dislodge John, who retained control over the Temple area. Simon's forces grew as the Idumaeans and nobles joined him.

In June 69, Vespasian subdued the toparchies of Gophna and Acrabetta and captured the cities of Bethel and Ephraim. He then approached Jerusalem's walls, killing many and capturing others, marking his closest approach to the city. Meanwhile, Cerialis led a scorched-earth campaign in northern Idumaea, burning Caphethra and capturing Capharabis, whose residents surrendered to the Romans with olive branches, sparing the town from destruction. The Romans then destroyed Hebron and slaughtered its inhabitants.

Infighting in Jerusalem persisted throughout the summer of 69. The rival factions burned the city's food supplies to weaken their opponents, severely depleting the resources needed to withstand the impending siege. According to Tacitus, "There were constant battles, treachery and arson among them, and a large store of grain was burnt." Several rabbinic sources report that extremists set fire to the supplies to compel the people to fight the Romans. (Note: The rabbinic narration can be found in Lamentations Rabbah 1.31, Ecclesiastes Rabbah 7.12, and Avot de-Rabbi Natan (version A, c. 6; version B, c. 7); it is, however, called into question by Jonathan Price.) (Note: Josephus mentions the burning of food stores only after the split between John of Gischala and Eleazar ben Simon at a later stage, which, according to Jonathan Price, was deliberately placed by Josephus at that point, despite occurring earlier, as a rhetorical device to amplify the internal conflict.) The destruction of supplies led to widespread starvation.

According to Josephus, Vespasian was proclaimed emperor by his troops in Caesarea in mid-69, though the official account places his first acclamation on 1 July in Alexandria. After reluctantly accepting, he secured the support of Egypt, followed by Syria and other provinces. With military operations in Judaea paused, he traveled to Alexandria in autumn 69 and remained there with Titus during winter. With Vitellius, the reigning emperor, dead on 20 December 69, the Senate conferred imperial authority on Vespasian the next day. Command in Judaea was transferred to Titus, while Vespasian stayed in Egypt until later summer 70, when he sailed to Rome to secure the throne.

== Siege of Jerusalem and conclusion of the war ==
=== Siege of Jerusalem ===
Later in the winter of 69/70, Titus returned to Judaea with over 48,000 troops, establishing his base in Caesarea. His forces included legions V Macedonica, X Fretensis, XV Apollinaris, XII Fulminata, auxiliaries from Egypt and vassal kingdoms, and Arab allies reportedly driven by long-standing hostility toward the Jews. In early Nisan (March/April) 70, Titus camped near Gibeah, north of Jerusalem, choosing to attack from the north, where the terrain lacked natural defenses. Jerusalem, then swollen with pilgrims attending the Passover festival and with refugees, faced mounting pressure as Roman forces approached. The warring factions only united as the Romans battered its walls. Titus narrowly escaped an ambush during reconnaissance, then established camps at Mount Scopus and the Mount of Olives, repelling a Jewish surprise attack during the latter's construction.

On 14 Nisan, at the onset of Passover, the Jews halted their attacks to observe the holiday; the Romans exploited the lull to position their siege forces. That night, as the sanctuary's inner gates were opened to worshippers, John's faction infiltrated the inner court, concealing their weapons, and overpowered the Zealots, who then accepted a truce. After fifteen days, the Romans breached the Third Wall and captured the northern suburbs. The Second Wall was breached soon after; though initially unable to hold the area, the Romans later secured it, destroyed northern Jerusalem, and paraded their forces for psychological effect. A famine ravaged the city, (Note: Josephus mentions children with swollen bellies and mentions deserters who appear to have suffered from dropsy. In Lamentations Rabbah, Eleazar bar Zadok recounts how, despite living many years after the destruction, his father's body never fully recovered. The same work also mentions a woman whose hair fell out due to malnutrition.) with Josephus describing mass suffering and even cannibalism. Attempted escapees were executed by both rebels and Romans, as Arab and Syrian auxiliaries disemboweled refugees while searching for hidden valuables. By Sivan (May/June), the Romans had completed a circumvallation wall, which effectively cut off supplies and escape routes. The defenders destroyed the siege engines targeting the Antonia Fortress by tunneling beneath them and setting them ablaze, but the fortress eventually fell, leading the Romans to turn their assault toward the Temple. The defenders burned the porticoes linking the sanctuary to the fortress to block Roman access and took refuge in the courtyards. On the eighth day of Av (July/August), the sanctuary's outer court was breached.

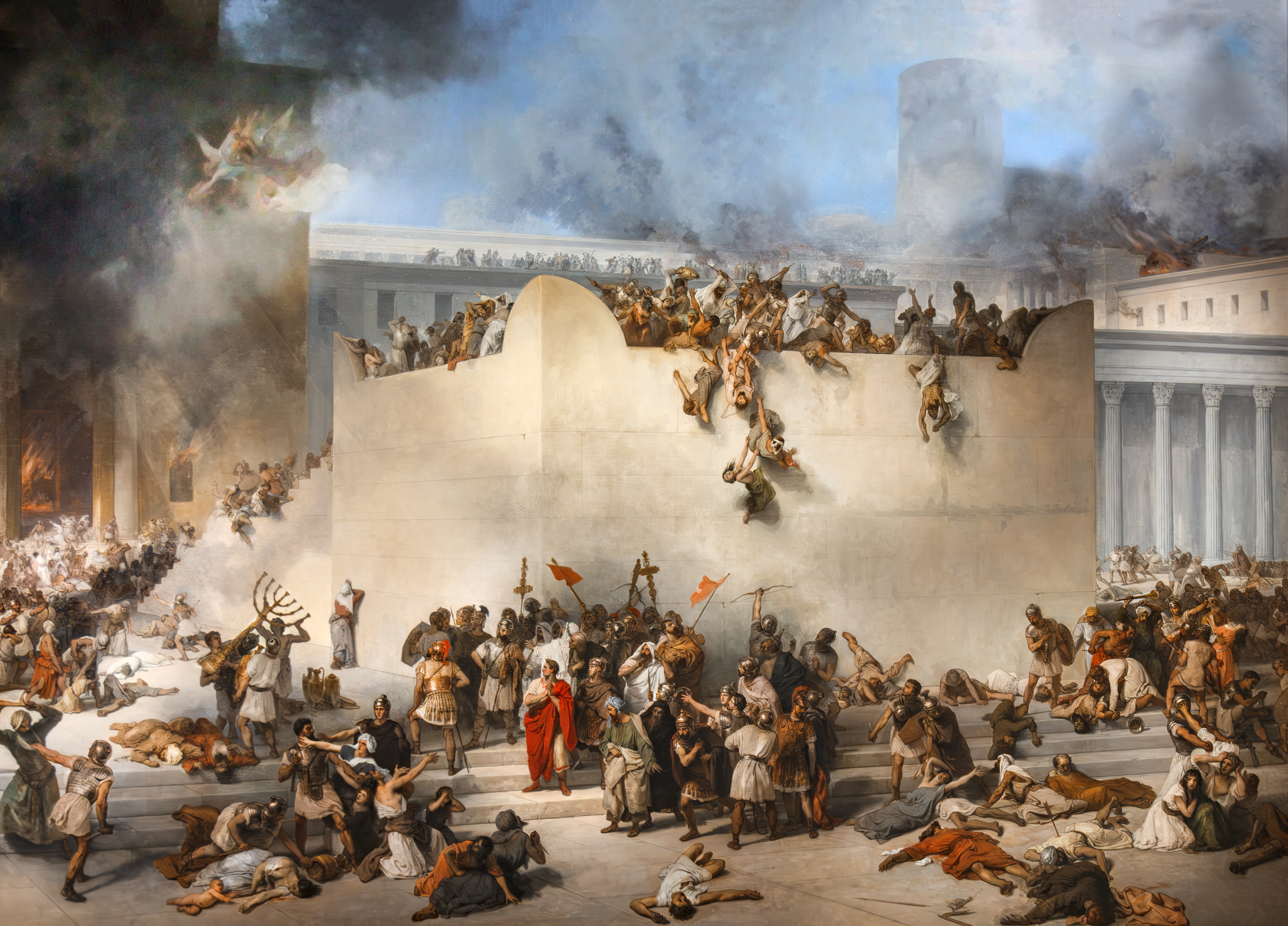
The Destruction of the Temple of Jerusalem, painting by Francesco Hayez, 1867

On 10 Av, a Roman soldier hurled a burning object into the Temple, sparking a blaze that consumed the structure. According to Josephus, Titus intended to preserve the Temple as a symbol of Roman rule, and when it caught fire, he ordered the flames extinguished, but his soldiers ignored or did not hear him. The fourth-century historian Sulpicius Severus, reflecting a tradition often traced to Tacitus, claimed that Titus had explicitly ordered the Temple's destruction. Modern scholarship often favors the view that Titus authorized the destruction, though the matter remains subject to debate. Amid the fire, chaos reigned—mass suicides and indiscriminate slaughter followed. (Note: Josephus describes how some priests, overwhelmed by grief and despair at the sight of the Temple engulfed in flames, leapt into the fire. Cassius Dio recounts that as the temple burned and defeat became inevitable, many Jews chose suicide, viewing it as a form of victory and salvation to die alongside the temple. According to Josephus, approximately 6,000 Jews, including women and children, sought refuge in a colonnade in the outer court, but the Romans set it on fire, killing them all.) The remaining structures on the Temple Mount were razed.

Titus ordered the destruction of several districts, including the Acra and the Ophel, followed by the entire Lower City. On 20 Av, the Upper City was stormed. Soldiers massacred people in their homes and streets, and many who fled into tunnels were either killed or captured. According to Josephus, Titus spared only three towers of Herod's palace and a portion of Jerusalem's western wall for a Roman garrison, while the rest of the city was systematically razed. The archeological record confirms widespread destruction and burning across the city in 70 CE.

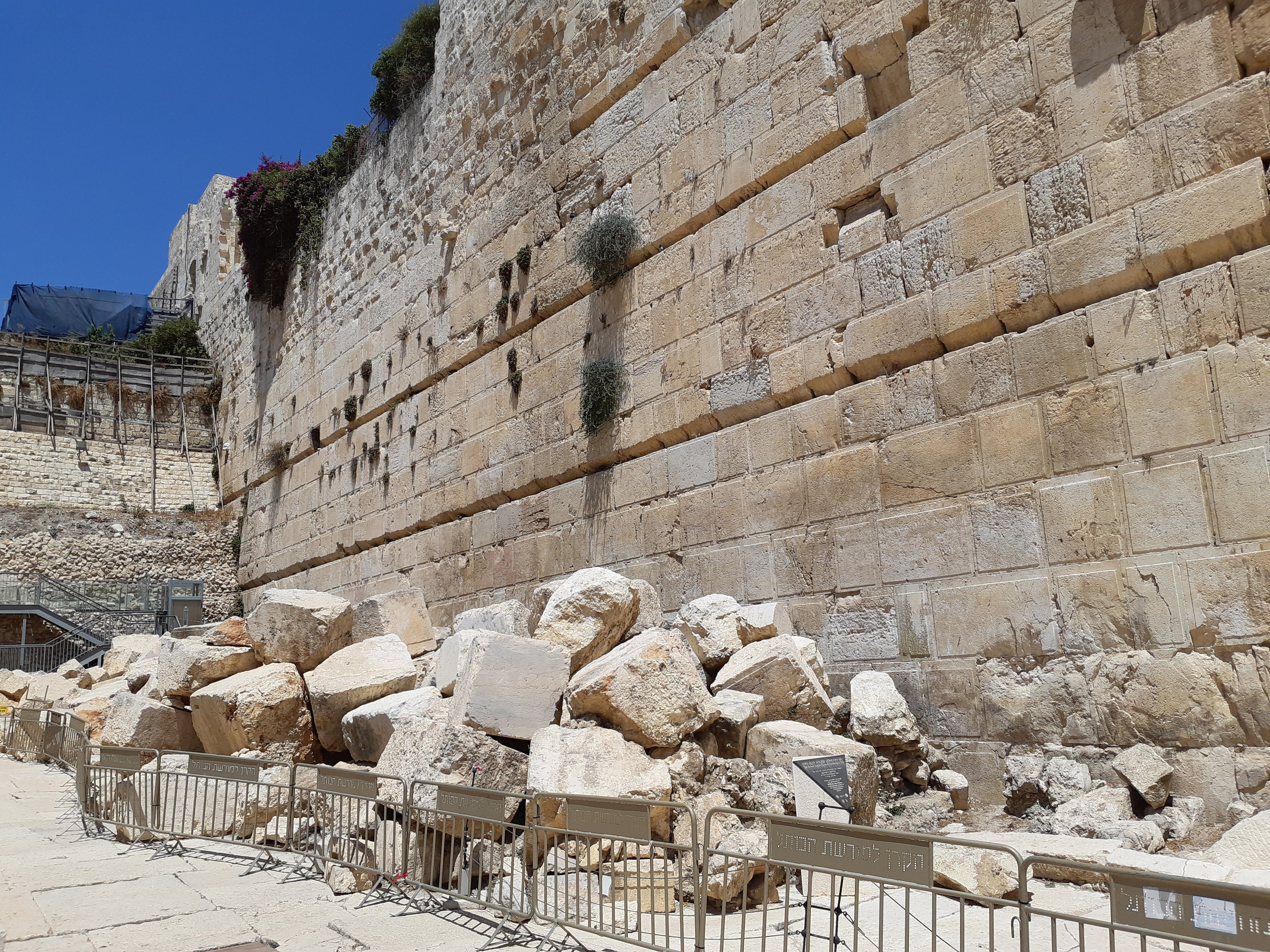
A pile of stones beneath the Western Wall, thrown down by Roman legionaries from the Temple Mount during its destruction, now preserved in the Jerusalem Archaeological Park

After the city's fall, the elderly and infirm were killed against Titus's orders, while younger survivors were sorted: rebels executed, the strongest sent to Titus' triumph, those over 17 enslaved or executed across the empire, and children sold into slavery. John of Gischala surrendered and was sentenced to life imprisonment, and Simon bar Giora, captured after emerging from a tunnel, was brought in chains before Titus.

=== Triumph in Rome ===
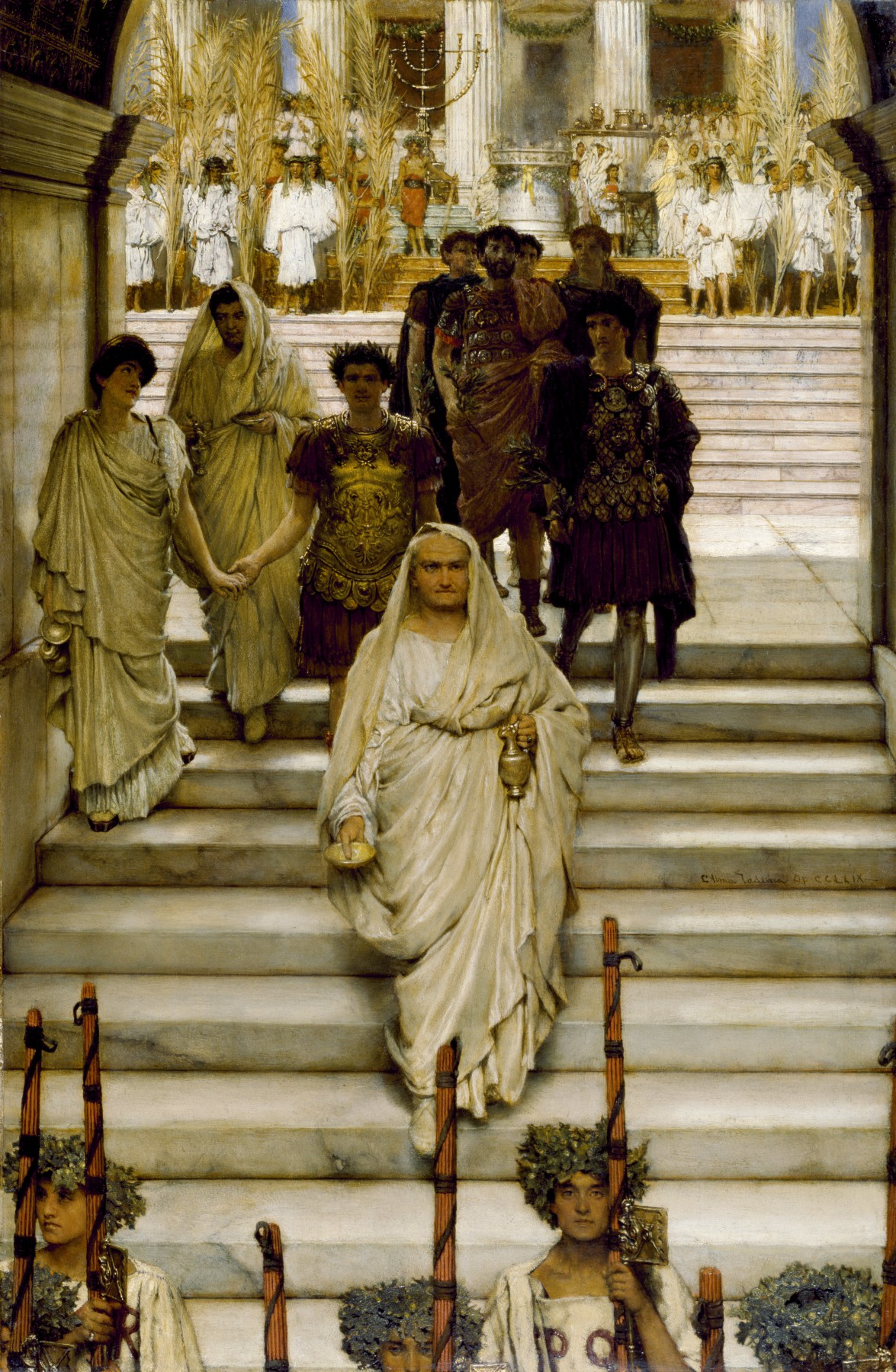
The Triumph of Titus, painting by Lawrence Alma-Tadema, 1885

After Jerusalem's fall, Titus toured Judaea and southern Syria, funding spectacles with Jewish captives. (Note: According to historian Nathanael Andrade, these events served to unify the ethnically and culturally diverse populations of Greek cities, while simultaneously marginalizing Jews, who were perceived as a threat to the Greek way of life. Additionally, these spectacles led Greeks to view the Romans as their defenders against Jewish uprising.) In Caesarea Philippi, he staged executions, gladiatorial combat, and wild animal killings. For his brother Domitian's birthday, celebrated in Caesarea Maritima, 2,500 captives were slaughtered in similar games. More executions followed during Vespasian's birthday in Berytus.

In the summer of 71, a triumph was celebrated in Rome to mark the victory in Judaea—the only imperial triumph ever held for the subjugation of a provincial population already under Roman rule. The event, witnessed by hundreds of thousands of spectators, featured Vespasian and Titus riding in chariots. The procession featured treasures and artworks, including tapestries, gemstones, statues, and animals. Among the treasures carried in the procession were the Temple's menorah, a golden table, possibly that of the Showbread, and "the law of the Jews", likely sacred texts taken from the Temple. According to Josephus, Jewish captives were paraded "to display their own destruction", while multi-story scaffolds showcased ivory and gold craftsmanship, illustrating scenes of the war. Simon bar Giora was paraded in the procession and, upon its end on Capitoline Hill, whipped severely and taken to the Mamertine Prison, where he was executed by hanging.

=== Last strongholds ===
In the spring of 71, Titus departed for Rome, leaving three fortresses still under rebel control. Sextus Lucilius Bassus, the new legate of Judaea, was tasked with their conquest. Herodium, located south of Jerusalem, appears to have fallen rapidly. Bassus then crossed the Jordan River to besiege Machaerus, constructing a circumvallation wall, siege camps, and an incomplete assault ramp, traces of which still exist today. The rebels capitulated after witnessing the Romans prepare Eleazar, a well-born young man who had ventured outside the fort, for crucifixion. They then negotiated terms, securing assurances of safe passage for the Jewish defenders. The Romans slaughtered all non-Jews at the site, except for a few who escaped. Bassus then pursued rebels led by Judah ben Ari in the forest of Jardes. (Note: The precise location of the forest remains unknown. Gwyn Davies has suggested Wadi Mujib or a similar valley in the region of Moab as the likely site.) Roman cavalry surrounded the forest while infantry cut down trees and overpowered the outmatched rebels; 3,000 were reportedly killed. Bassus then died of uncertain causes.

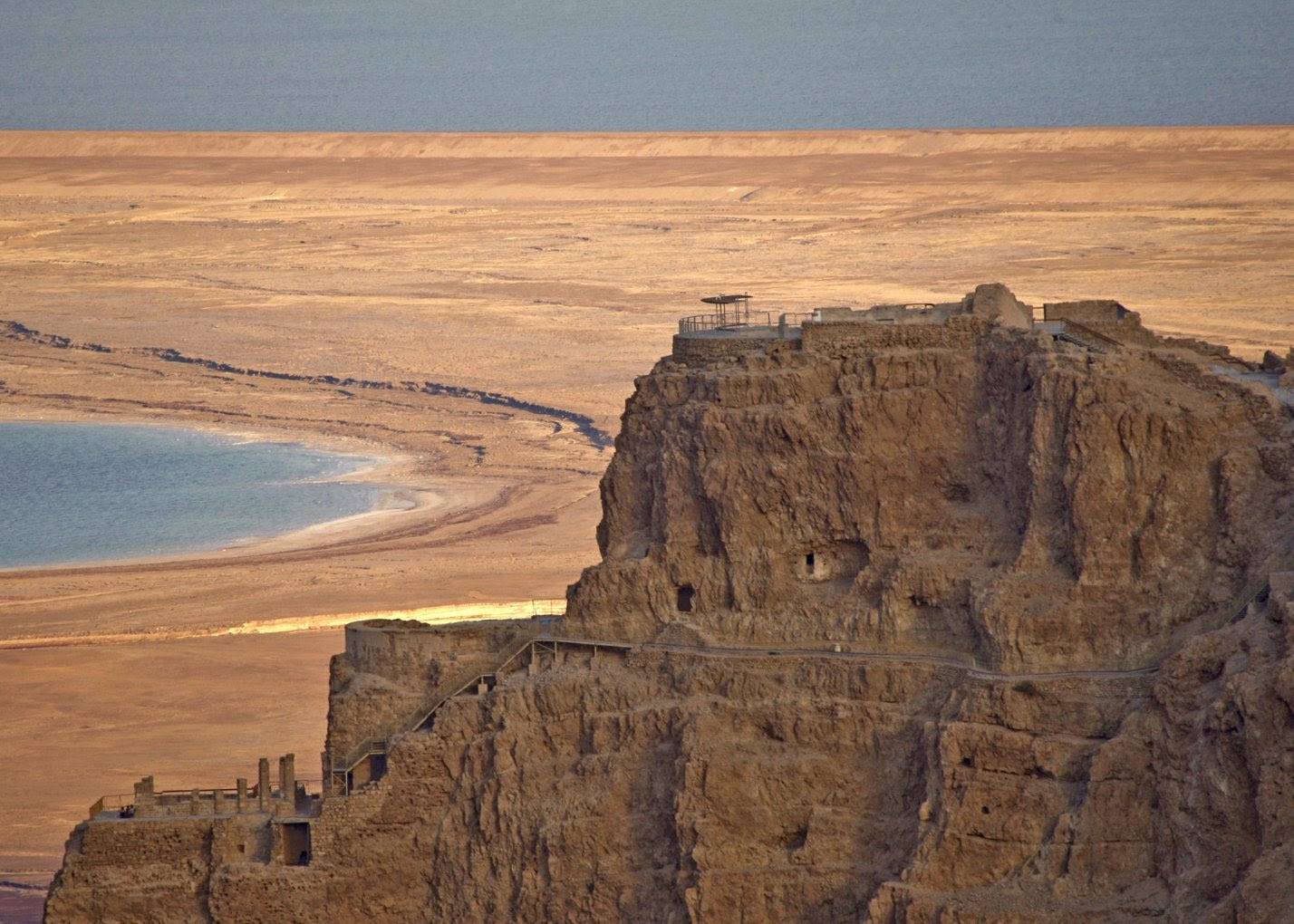
Masada marked the final stand of the revolt, falling to Lucius Flavius Silva after a siege in 73 or 74 AD.

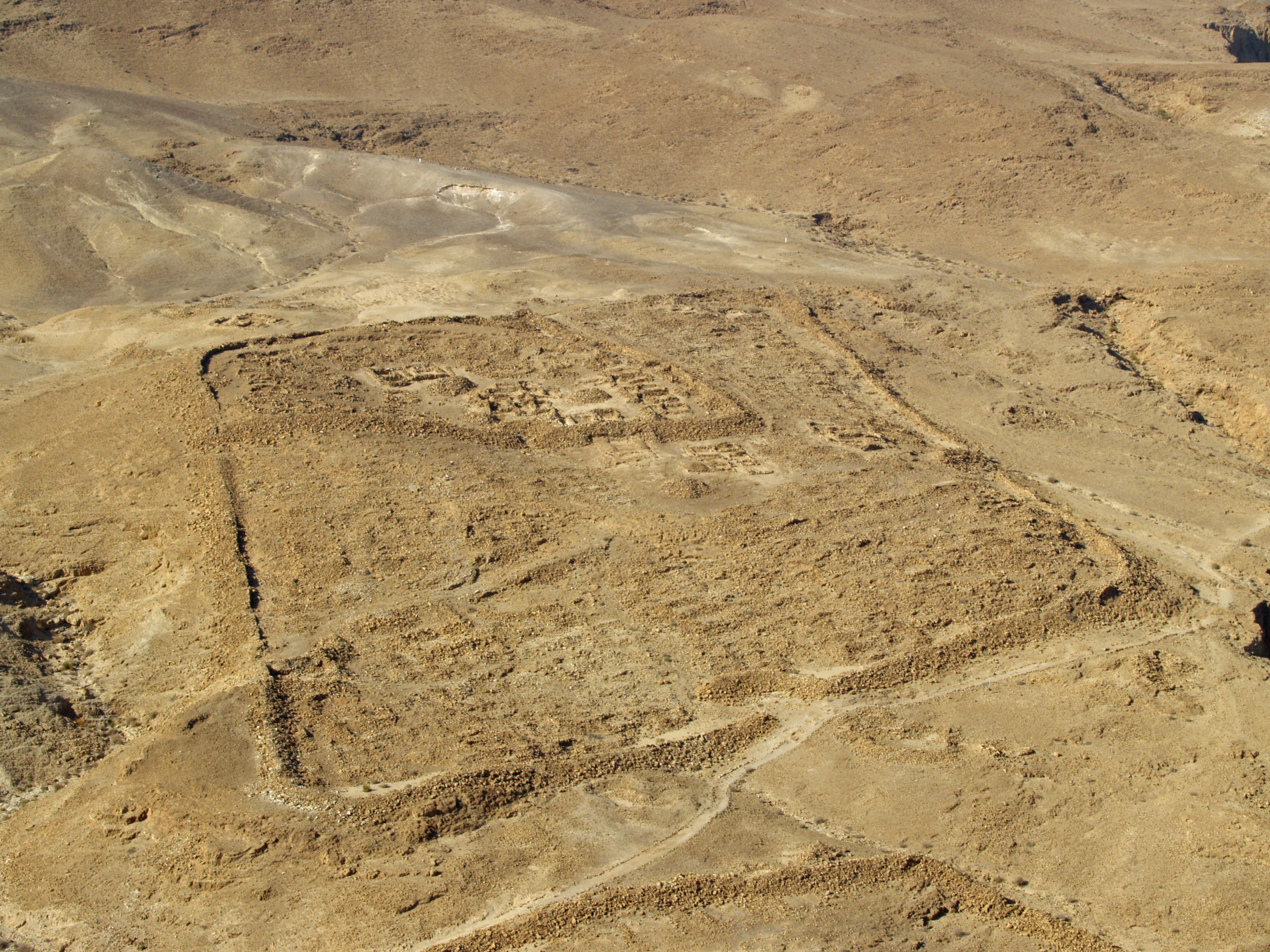
Remnants of one of several legionary camps at Masada, just outside the circumvallation wall at the bottom of the image

Lucius Flavius Silva succeeded Bassus and, during the winter of 72/73 (or possibly 73/74), led a force of about 8,000 troops—including Legio X Fretensis and auxiliaries—to besiege Masada, the last rebel stronghold. When its Sicarii defenders refused to surrender, he established siege camps and a circumvallation wall around the fort, along with a siege ramp, features that remain among the best-preserved examples of Roman siegecraft. The siege lasted between two and six months. According to Josephus, when it became evident that the last fortification would fall, Eleazar ben Yair, the leader of the rebels, delivered a speech advocating for collective suicide. He argued that this act would preserve their freedom, spare them from slavery, and deny their enemies a final victory. The rebels carried out the plan, each man killing his own family before taking his own life. When the Romans entered the fortress, they found that 960 of the 967 inhabitants had committed suicide. Only two women and five children survived, having concealed themselves in a cistern. Archaeological work at Masada uncovered eleven ostraca (one of which contained the name of Ben Yair, possibly used to determine the order of suicide), twenty-five skeletons of the defenders, ritual baths and a synagogue. Findings at the site support Josephus' account of the siege, though the mass suicide's historicity remains debated. (Note: As noted by classicist Louis Feldman, Josephus' account was contested for several reasons, including the strong discouragement of suicide by Jewish law and expectations of a last stand by the fighters. Historian Shaye J. D. Cohen suggested that although Josephus' mass suicide narrative likely has a factual basis—some Sicarii indeed committing suicide—it was exaggerated for dramatic effect, serving as a polemic against the Sicarii and drawing inspiration from the Greco-Roman fascination with collective suicide.)

== Aftermath ==
=== Destruction and displacement in Judaea ===
The revolt's suppression had a profound impact on the Jews of Judaea. Many died in battles, sieges, and famine; cities, towns, and villages across the region suffered varying degrees of destruction. The Jewish capital of Jerusalem—praised by Pliny the Elder as "by far the most famous city of the East"—was systematically destroyed, with much of its population massacred or enslaved. Tacitus described the siege as involving "six hundred thousand" besieged people of all ages and both sexes, remarking: "Both men and women showed the same determination; and if they were to be forced to change their home, they feared life more than death." Josephus claimed that 1.1 million people died in Jerusalem, including pilgrims present for Passover—a figure widely considered exaggerated. Historian Seth Schwartz estimates the population of Judaea at roughly 1 million (half Jewish), noting that large Jewish communities survived the war. Rogers similarly interprets Josephus' number as intended to flatter the Romans and instead suggested 20,000–30,000 deaths in Jerusalem. Classicist Charles Murison suggested the 1.1 million may refer to total war losses.

Aside from Jerusalem itself, Judea proper experienced the most severe devastation, particularly in the Judaean Mountains. Cities like Lod, Yavneh and their surroundings remained relatively intact. In Galilee, Tarichaea (likely Magdala) and Gabara were destroyed, but Sepphoris and Tiberias reconciled with the Romans and escaped major harm. Mixed cities saw the elimination of their Jewish populations, and the impact extended into parts of Transjordan. Furthermore, large numbers of Jews were taken captive. Josephus' report of 97,000 captives has been accepted by several scholars. (Note: Rogers attributes this reliability to the Roman practice of recording the number of slaves sold after their wars. Schwartz concurs, noting that this indicates a significant portion of the population was either expelled from the country or, at the very least, displaced.) Many faced harsh treatment, execution, or forced labor. Some strong young men were sent into gladiatorial combat across the empire. Young of both sexes were sent to brothels. Many were sold into slavery, most of them exiled abroad.

Historian Moshe David Herr estimates that a quarter of Judaea's Jews were killed and another tenth captured, effectively erasing about one-third of the province's Jewish population. Despite the devastating losses, Jewish life recovered and continued to flourish in Judaea. Jews remained the largest population group in the region, and Jewish society eventually regained enough strength to rise in revolt again during the Bar Kokhba Revolt (132–136 CE). That rebellion's suppression proved even more catastrophic, leading to the widespread destruction and depopulation of Judea proper.

=== Economic and social ramifications ===
The uprising effectively ended the already limited Jewish autonomy under Rome. The social impact was profound, particularly for the classes closely associated with the Temple. The aristocracy, including the High Priesthood, who held significant influence and amassed great wealth, collapsed entirely. Their fall, along with that of the Sanhedrin, created a leadership vacuum.

The revolt significantly impacted Judaea's economy, and to a lesser extent, the broader Jewish world. The influx of pilgrims concentrated vast wealth in Jerusalem, but its destruction ended this prosperity. The Romans confiscated and auctioned the land of Jews who participated in the insurrection, affecting many landowners in Judea proper. The date and balsam groves of Jericho and Ein Gedi, along with other "royal lands", were incorporated into Vespasian's estate. The countryside was devastated; Josephus reports that all trees around Jerusalem were felled during the siege, leaving the land barren. Only a few Jews remained in Jerusalem's vicinity, which Pliny the Elder now referred to as the toparchy of Orine, a name that appears to reflect the region's mountainous terrain. The emperor took control of the area, and the Jews were forced to work it as quasi-tenants.

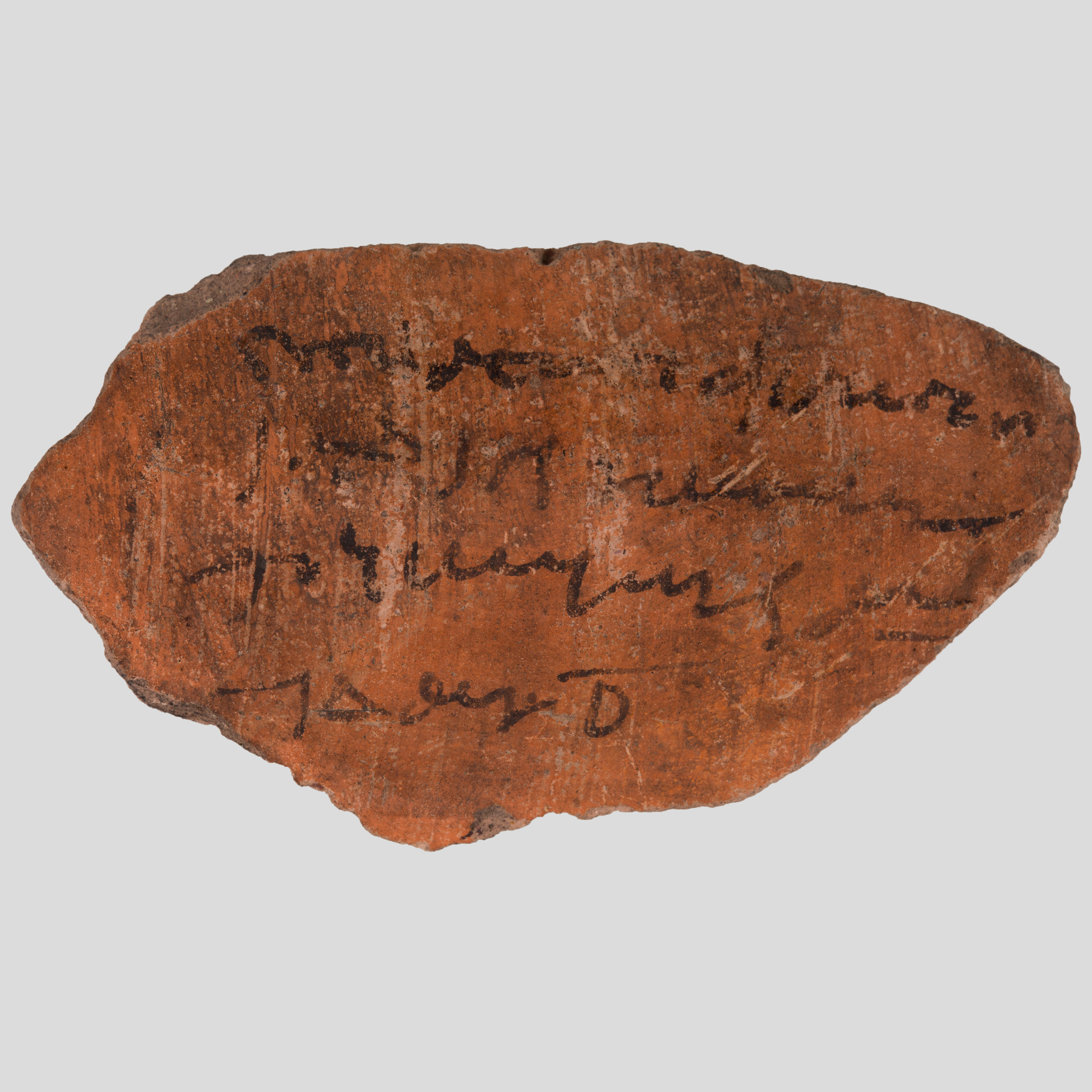
After the revolt, a new tax, the Fiscus Judaicus, was imposed on all Jews in the Empire. Pictured is a receipt of payment from Edfu

Following the destruction of Jerusalem, the Romans imposed a new tax, the Fiscus Judaicus, on all Jews across the Empire. (Note: Samuel Safrai noted that the tax arose from the Roman idea that the deities of conquered nations became subordinate to Rome, and thus the temple revenue of Israel's God was seized as part of their victory.) This tax required Jews to pay an annual sum of two drachmas, replacing the half-shekel previously donated to the Temple. The funds were redirected to the rebuilding and maintenance of the Temple of Jupiter Capitolinus in Rome, which had been destroyed during the civil war of 69. The tax implicitly held all Jews in the Roman Empire responsible for the revolt, even though most had no role in the conflict. Under Domitian, tax enforcement became more stringent. Suetonius wrote that Domitian extended the tax to those who lived as Jews without openly acknowledging it and to those who hid their Jewish background. His successor, Nerva, reformed the tax system, applying it only to Jews who observed their ancestral customs.

=== Establishment of Roman garrisons and colonies ===
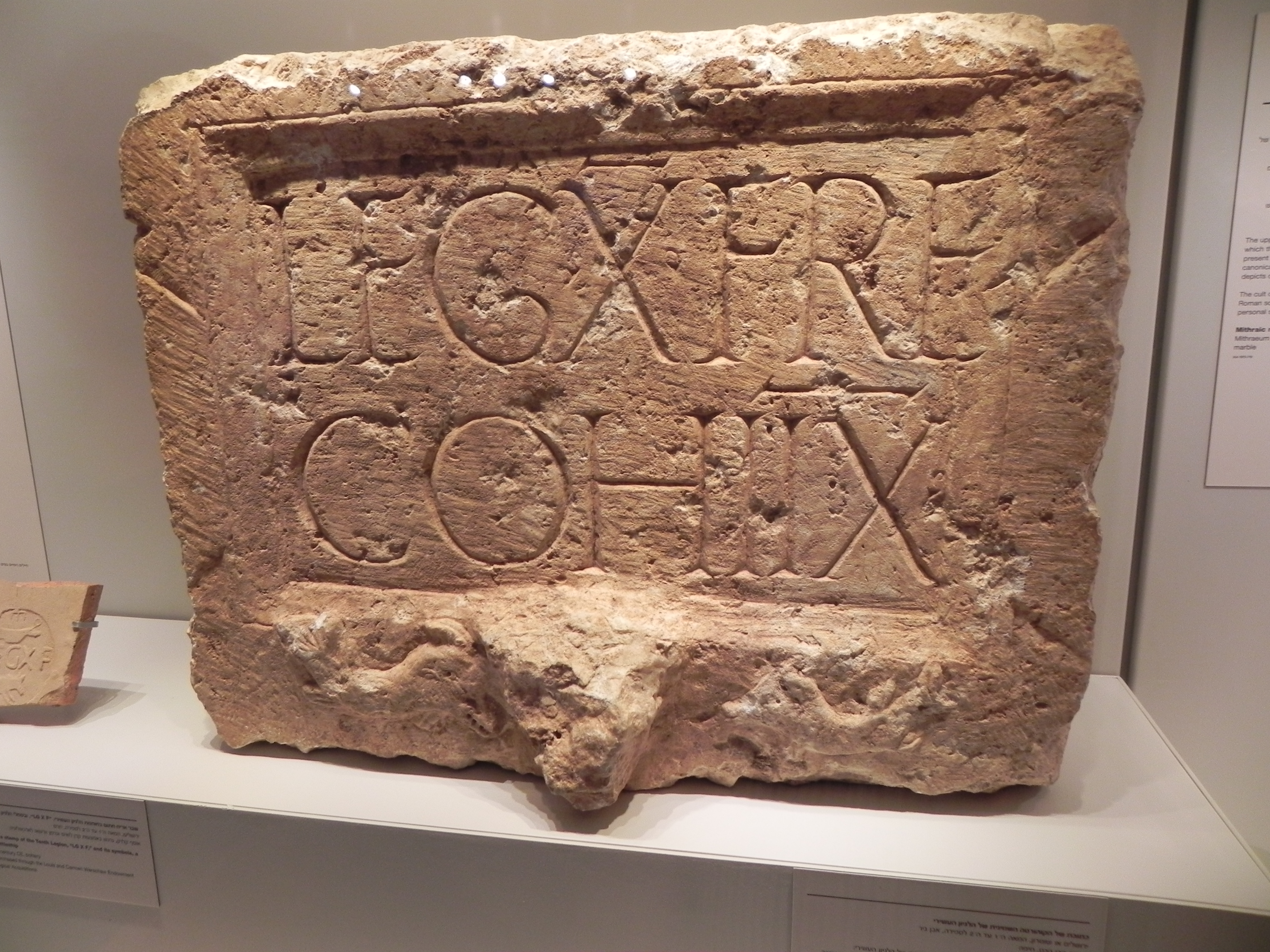
An inscription referencing Legio X Fretensis, a legion stationed on Jerusalem's ruins

Following the revolt, Jerusalem was garrisoned by Legio X Fretensis, which remained stationed there for nearly two centuries. The Roman forces also included cavalry alae and infantry cohortes. This increased presence prompted changes in the province's administrative structure, requiring the appointment of a governor (legatus Augusti pro praetore) of ex-praetorian rank. Within this new framework, the regions of Judea and Idumaea were designated as a military zone (campus legionis) under the command of officers from Legio X.

Former soldiers, along with other Roman citizens, established themselves in Judaea. Vespasian settled 800 veterans in Motza, which became a colony named Colonia Amosa or Colonia Emmaus. He also granted colony status to Caesarea, renaming it Colonia Prima Flavia Augusta Caesarensis and settling many veterans there. A large odeon was reportedly built in the city on the site of a former synagogue, using war spoils. The devastated port town of Jaffa was re-founded, and a new city, Flavia Neapolis, was founded in Samaritis, near the ruins of Shechem.

=== In the Jewish diaspora ===
The revolt led to the revocation of many privileges previously enjoyed by Jews in the diaspora. Roman authorities took measures to quell possible uprisings, focusing on individuals deemed troublemakers in Egypt and Cyrenaica, which had absorbed thousands of refugees and insurgents from Judaea. According to Josephus, a group of Sicarii fled to these regions, where they tried to incite rebellion and, even under torture, refused to acknowledge the emperor as "lord". Jewish institutions were now seen as potential sources of rebellion, leading to the closure of the Jewish temple at Leontopolis in Egypt in 72.

In the spring of 71, upon arriving in Antioch, Titus faced demands from the city's residents to expel the Jews, but he refused, stating that the Jews' country had been destroyed and that no other place would accept them. The crowd then sought removal of tablets inscribed with the Jews' rights, but Titus again declined. In 73 , the Jewish aristocracy in Cyrenaica was killed. Vespasian did not openly approve, but he implicitly endorsed it by treating the responsible Roman governor leniently.

In the wake of the revolt, thousands of Jewish slaves were brought to the Italian Peninsula. A tombstone from Puteoli, near Naples, mentions a captive woman from Jerusalem named Claudia Aster, the name Aster believed to be derived from Esther. The Roman poet Martial references a Jewish slave of his, described as originating from "Jerusalem destroyed by fire". Jewish slaves brought to Italy after the war are also evidenced by graffiti in Pompeii and other places in Campania, as well as possibly by Habinnas, a character who may have been Jewish, in Petronius' Satyricon. There are records of other Jews bearing the nomen "Flavius", possibly indicating descent from freed captives. Rome itself experienced a significant influx of Jewish slaves.

The destruction of Jerusalem also brought Jews to the Arabian Peninsula, leading to the establishment of settlements in southern Yemen, along the coast of Ḥaḍramawt, and most notably in the Hejaz, particularly in Yathrib (later Medina), where they became prominent representatives of monotheism in pre-Islamic Arabia. Around the same period, Jews also began settling in Hispania (modern Spain and Portugal) and Gaul (modern France).

=== Roman commemoration of the victory ===
Vespasian, who came from a relatively modest background, leveraged his victory to solidify his claim to the emperorship, elevate Rome's prestige, and redirect attention from the civil war that had brought him to power, heralding an era of peace reminiscent of Augustus' reign. His dynasty framed its legitimacy on triumph over a foreign enemy.

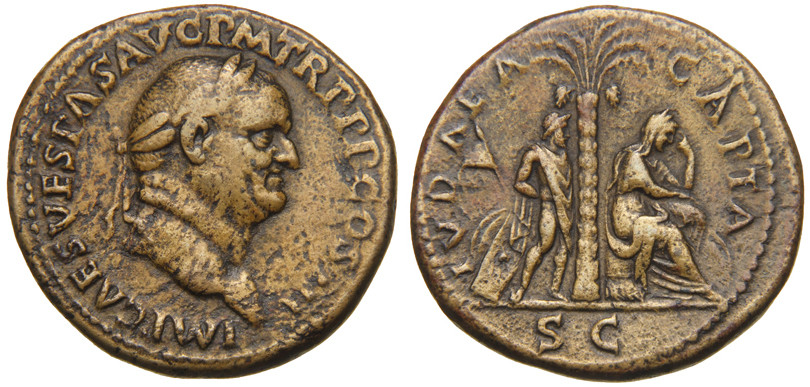
A Judaea Capta coin issued by Vespasian, depicting a bound captive and a mourning woman personifying the Jewish people beneath a date palm, a symbol of Judaea

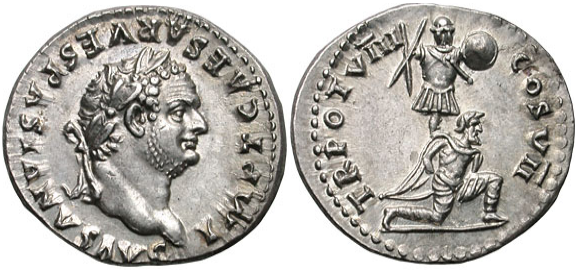
Denarius depicting Titus and a Jewish captive kneeling in front of a trophy of arms (c. 79)

The Flavians issued a series of coins inscribed with the title Judaea Capta ("Judaea has been conquered") to commemorate the subjugation of the province. Issued over a 10–12-year period, the series marked a rare instance of a provincial defeat being celebrated in Roman coinage and served as a key component of Flavian propaganda. The obverse of the coins typically featured portraits of Titus or Vespasian; while the reverse depicted symbolic imagery, including a mourning woman, representing the Jewish people, seated beneath a date palm, a symbol of Judaea. Variations in the designs included depictions of the woman bound, kneeling, or blindfolded before Nike (or Victoria), personifications of victory.

Rome's city center was reshaped with victory monuments, including two triumphal arches: the Arch of Titus on the Via Sacra, completed after Titus' death in 81, and another, probably at the Circus Maximus, finished earlier that same year. The first, still standing, is widely attributed to Domitian, was dedicated by the Senate and People of Rome to the divine Titus. It features reliefs of soldiers carrying Temple spoils and Titus in a quadriga during the triumph. The second arch's inscription proclaimed Titus "subdued the Jewish people and destroyed the city of Jerusalem, a thing either sought in vain by all generals, kings and peoples before him or untried entirely". (Note: This claim overlooks earlier conquests of the city, including that of the Roman general Pompey a century earlier.)

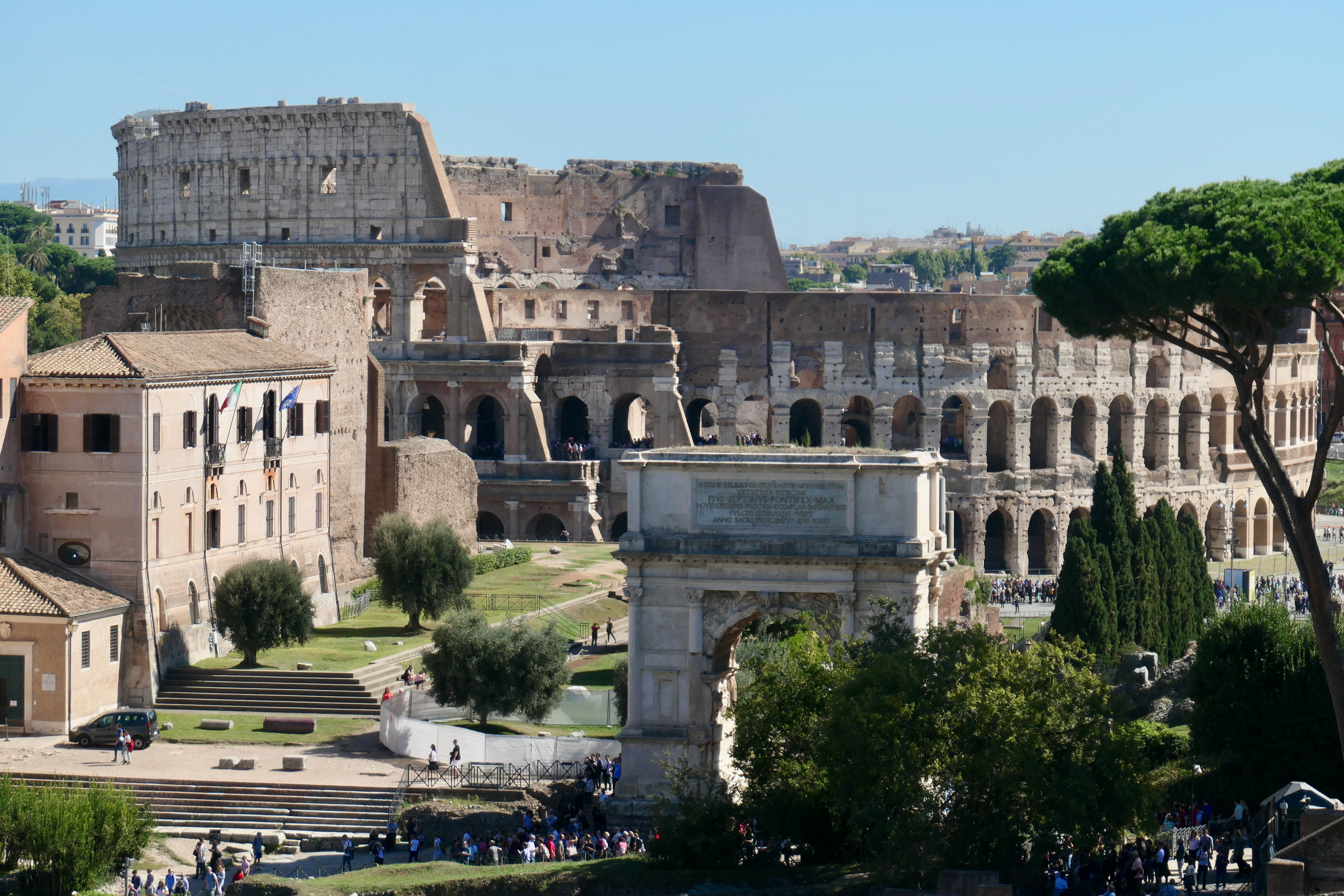
Rome's Arch of Titus (front) features reliefs of the triumph, including the display of Temple vessels; the Colosseum (back) was financed "from the spoils of the war"

The Temple spoils, including the menorah, were displayed in the newly built Temple of Peace, alongside other masterpieces of art. The temple, dedicated to Pax, the Roman goddess of peace, symbolized the restoration of peace throughout the Empire. The Colosseum, initiated by Vespasian and completed under Titus, was financed "ex manubi(i)s" (from the spoils of war), as noted in an inscription, tying its funding to the Jewish War.

Construction works commemorating the victory seem to have also taken place in Syria. John Malalas, a sixth-century Byzantine chronicler, wrote that a synagogue in Daphne, near Antioch, was destroyed during the war and replaced by Vespasian with a theater, an inscription of which claimed it was founded "from the spoils of Judaea". He also describes a gate of cherubs in Antioch, established by Titus from the spoils of the Temple.

== Legacy ==
=== Impact on Judaism ===
==== Yavneh, ben Zakkai, and the transformation of Judaism ====
The destruction of the Second Temple, as a symbol of God's presence which was central to Jewish life, created a deep religious and societal void. It ended sacrificial offerings, terminated the High Priesthood's lineage, and led to the disappearance of Jewish sectarianism. The Sadducees, whose authority depended on the Temple, dissolved due to the loss of their power base, role in the revolt, land confiscations, and the collapse of Jewish self-governance. The Essenes too disappeared from the historical record. (Note: Goodman, however, notes that no direct sources explicitly document the disappearance of the Essenes and Sadducees following the destruction, with the first clear evidence for their demise appearing in the fourth century, though it does not provide a specific date.) The Pharisees—who had largely opposed the revolt—survived. Their spiritual successors, (Note: Though not all early rabbis were Pharisees, and they did not claim the label, Pharisaic teachings and practices were preserved by the emerging rabbinic movement. The house of Gamaliel—a prominent Pharisaic lineage whose descendants became leading rabbinic figures for generations—reflects the continuity between the two groups.) the rabbinic sages, emerged as the dominant force in Judaism through the rise of the rabbinic movement, which reoriented Jewish life around Torah study and acts of loving-kindness.

According to rabbinic sources, (Note: The episode is referenced in five works: Avot de-Rabbi Natan (Versions A and B), Midrash Lamentations, the Babylonian Talmud (Gittin), and Midrash Proverbs, with notable differences in the traditions.) Rabban Yohanan ben Zakkai (Ribaz), a prominent Pharisaic sage, was smuggled out of besieged Jerusalem in a coffin by his students. After prophesying Vespasian's rise to emperor, (Note: According to this rabbinic legend, Ben Zakkai quoted a prophecy from Isaiah (10:34): 'And the Lebanon shall fall by a majestic one.' In this context, 'Lebanon' is understood to refer to the Temple, constructed from the cedars of Lebanon, and 'majestic one' is interpreted as referring to Vespasian.) he secured permission to establish a rabbinic center in Yavneh. (Note: The exact details remain uncertain, and the rabbinic sources provide varying accounts of his conversation with Vespasian. Gedaliah Alon, for example suggested that Rabbi Yohanan ben Zakkai and his followers first arrived in the city as fugitives, as it had been designated by the Romans as a refuge for moderates. Josephus records that several dignitaries fled Jerusalem, making Ben Zakkai's escape plausible.) There, a system of rabbinic scholarship began to form, (Note: According to Shaye J. D. Cohen, the Yavneh center—composed mainly of Pharisees but functioning as a coalition of several groups— fostered a model that tolerated divergent opinions. This approach, exemplified in the Mishnah—where arguments and discussions are often attributed to individuals—embraced pluralism while seeking to eliminate factionalism.) laying the foundation for Rabbinic Judaism as the dominant form of Judaism in later centuries. Under Ben Zakkai and his successor Gamaliel II, various enactments adapted Jewish life to post-Temple reality, including extending Temple-related practices for observance outside the Temple. For example, the mitzvah (religious commandment) of taking the lulav was extended to all seven days of Sukkot everywhere, whereas it had previously been observed only in the Temple. The shofar was also permitted to be sounded in any courtyard when the New Year coincided with Shabbat. The prayer liturgy was formalized, including the Amidah, which was established to be recited three times daily as a substitute for the sacrificial offerings. The rabbinic reconstitution of Judaism continued over the subsequent centuries, culminating in the compilation of the Mishnah and later the two Talmuds, which became foundational texts of Jewish law.

The synagogue increasingly became the center of Jewish worship and community life. Rabbinic literature describes it as a "diminished" sanctuary, stating that divine presence resides there, especially during prayer or study. Traditional synagogue worship—including sermons and scripture readings—was preserved, and new forms such as piyyut (liturgical poetry) and organized prayer emerged. The priestly class, resettled in Galilee and the diaspora, helped shape these developments by contributing to synagogue liturgy and possibly to biblical translations. Rabbinic instruction maintained that certain rituals remained exclusive to the Temple, and most synagogues are faced toward its site.

==== Jewish responses to the destruction ====
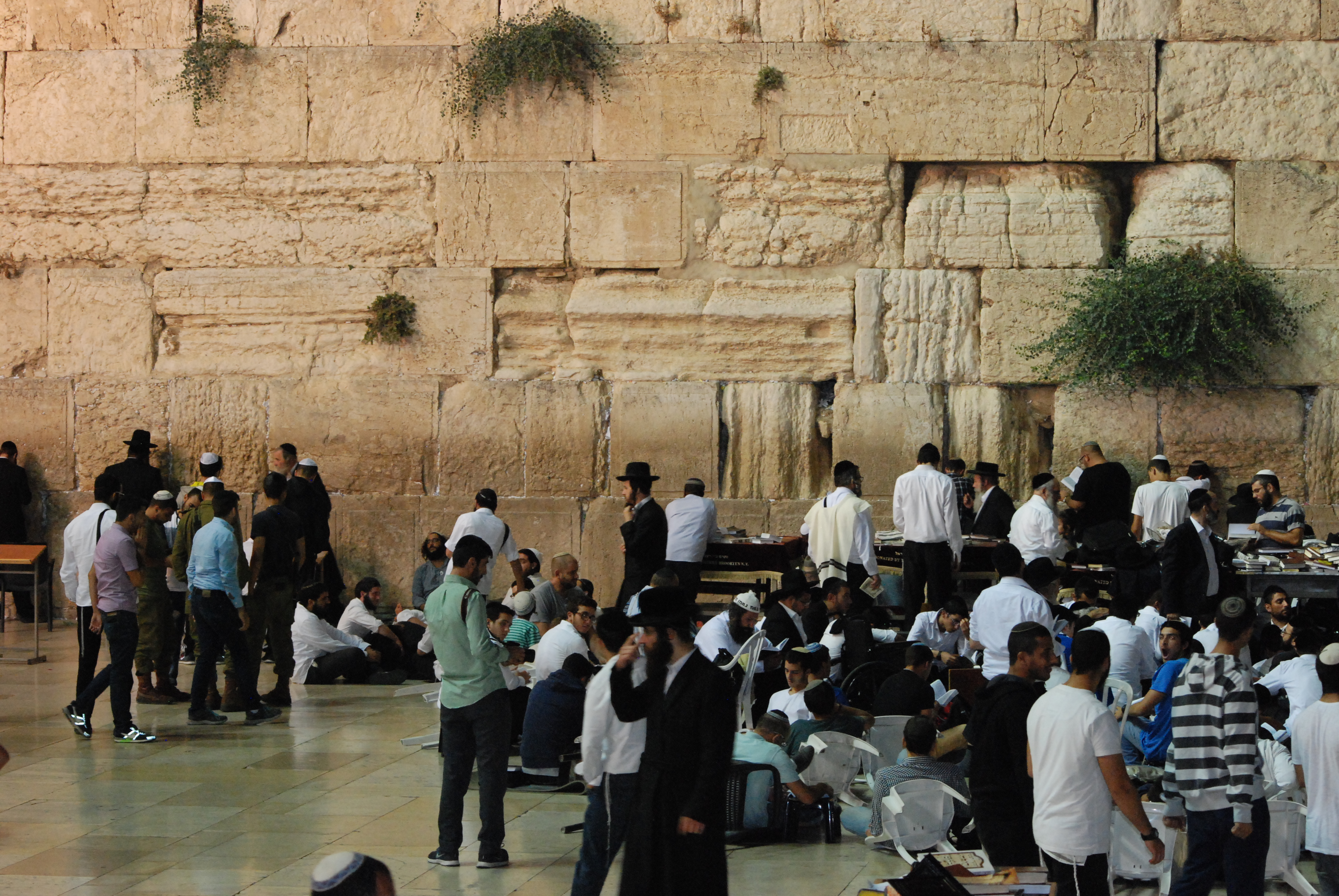
Jews praying at the Western Wall during Tisha B'Av, a fast day commemorating the Temple's destruction

The Temple's destruction is commemorated in Judaism on Tisha B'Av, a major fast day that also marks the destruction of the First Temple alongside other tragedies in Jewish history. The Western Wall, a remnant of the temple, had become a symbol of the homeland's destruction and the hope for its restoration. Following the destruction, some Jews reportedly mourned the loss by abstaining from meat and wine, while others withdrew to caves, awaiting redemption. In late antiquity, some communities even adopted the year of the Temple's destruction as a reference point for life events.

Jewish apocalyptic literature experienced a resurgence, mourning the Temple's destruction while offering explanations for the events. The Apocalypse of Baruch and Fourth Ezra interpreted the destruction of the Second Temple through the lens of the First, reusing its figures, historical setting, and biblical motifs to portray contemporary events as divinely ordained and heralding the end times. Drawing on the biblical precedent of Jerusalem's restoration after the Babylonian exile, they prophesied Rome's fall and Jerusalem's renewal. Both works affirmed Jewish continuity through the Torah and the enduring validity of the covenant with God. Book 4 of the Sibylline Oracles—a collection of Jewish and later Christian prophecies—likely written after the eruption of Mount Vesuvius in 79, links the destruction to the Roman civil war, retroactively prophesying a Roman leader who would burn the Temple and devastate the land of the Jews. It also foretells Nero's return as divine retribution against Rome and the Flavians.

The rabbinic response to Jerusalem's destruction is reflected in tales, traditions and exegetical writings integrated into rabbinic literature. Early rabbinic works convey profound grief and anguish, as exemplified by the Mishnah, which states in that since the destruction, "there has been no day without its curse". (Note: This statement can be found at Mishnah, Sotah 9:12, alongside other traditions which state that, after the destruction of the Second Temple, the shamir worm, the sweetness of the honeycomb, faithful people, dew falling for blessing, and the taste and fat of fruit all ceased.) Some texts attribute the destruction to punishment for Israel's sins and societal failings, such as weak leadership, internal divisions, misuse of wealth, and a lack of communal care. The Babylonian Talmud (Yoma 9b) explains that whereas the First Temple was destroyed due to idolatry, immorality, and bloodshed, the Second Temple fell because of the equally grave issue of groundless hatred. Another passage in the Babylonian Talmud (Gittin 55a) recounts the story of Kamsa and Bar Kamsa, in which a banquet host mistakenly invites Bar Kamsa instead of Kamsa. When Bar Kamsa is dishonored by being denied a seat, he becomes an informer to the Romans, triggering a series of events that lead to the war.

=== Impact on Jewish national identity ===
Judaic scholars Moshe and David Aberbach argued that the revolt's suppression left Jews "deprived of the territorial, social, and political bases of their nationalism", forcing them to base their identity and hopes for survival on cultural and moral power. Historian Adrian Hastings wrote that following the revolt, Jews ceased to be a political entity resembling a nation-state for almost two millennia. Despite this, they preserved their national identity through collective memory, religion, and sacred texts, remaining a nation rather than just an ethnic group, eventually leading to the rise of Zionism and the establishment of modern Israel.

=== Impact on Christianity ===
The revolt has been identified by several scholars as one of the stages in the gradual separation between Christianity and Judaism. It led to the destruction or dispersal of the Jerusalem church, the original center of the Christian community. According to later Christian sources like Eusebius and Epiphanius, (Note: This narrative can be found in Eusebius, Ecclesiastical History III.5.3, and in Epiphanius, Panarion 1.29.7.7–8 and 30.2.7, as well as On Weights and Measures 15.) Jerusalem's Christians fled to Pella before the war following divine guidance, though the historicity of this tradition remains debated. Scholar of Judaism Philip S. Alexander argued that, in the aftermath of the Temple's destruction, Christianity attempted to appeal to Jews in Judaea but failed due to its radical doctrines and the success of the rabbinic movement. Meanwhile, Christian groups in Asia Minor and the Aegean continued to grow, relatively insulated from the war's effects. Theologian Jörg Frey contends that the Temple's destruction had only a limited impact on Christian identity, which was shaped more significantly by the development of Christology.

Theologically, the destruction of the Temple was interpreted by early Christians as divine punishment for the Jewish rejection of Jesus. This idea appears in the New Testament Gospels, which include prophecies attributed to Jesus about the destruction of Jerusalem; the Gospel of Matthew may also allude to the burning of the city by Titus. The Epistle of Barnabas, one of the Biblical apocrypha, attributes the destruction to the Jews' role in bringing about the war, and presents it as evidence that God rejected the physical Temple in favor of a spiritual one, embodied in the faith of Gentile believers. By the fourth century, Church Fathers like Eusebius and John Chrysostom had fully integrated this view, portraying the destruction as both retribution and the symbolic beginning of the apostolic mission to the wider world. The eschatological view of preterism, which holds that many or all New Testament prophecies were fulfilled in the first century, interprets Jerusalem's destruction as the fulfillment of Jesus' prophecies. Partial preterists see the event as marking the end of the Old Covenant and God's judgment on Israel, while maintaining belief in a future return of Christ and final judgment. In contrast, full preterists see it as the fulfillment of all New Testament eschatology, including resurrection (understood as deliverance of believers from the condemnation of death imposed by Jewish authorities) and judgment, enacted through Christ's use of Rome's armies to destroy the Temple and inaugurate the New Covenant.

=== Later Jewish–Roman relations ===
Two further Jewish revolts against Rome occurred in the second century. In 115, the Diaspora Revolt erupted, with large-scale uprisings in multiple provinces and limited activity in Judaea. The causes were rooted in the Temple's destruction and the Jewish tax. Refugees and traders from Judaea are believed to have spread the ideas from the first revolt, as evidenced by the discovery of revolt coinage in these areas. The revolt's suppression led to the near-total annihilation of Jewish communities in Cyprus, Egypt, and Libya.

In 132, the Jews of Judaea launched their last major effort to regain independence—the Bar Kokhba Revolt—triggered by the establishment of Aelia Capitolina, a Roman colony on Jerusalem's ruins. The revolt led to widespread destruction and the near-total depopulation of Judea, many Jews being killed or sold into slavery and transported abroad. After the fall of Betar in 135, Hadrian imposed harsh anti-Jewish laws to dismantle Jewish nationalism, banned Jews from Jerusalem, and renamed the province Syria Palaestina, ending Jewish aspirations for national independence. The Jewish population had significantly declined; most Jews were concentrated in Galilee. By the late second century CE, under the rabbinic patriarch Judah ha-Nasi, the Jews had reached a pragmatic coexistence with Rome.

== Historical sources ==
The main primary source for the revolt is Josephus (37/38 – c. 100 CE), born Yosef ben Mattityahu, a Jewish historian of priestly descent and a native of Jerusalem, who led the defense of Galilee early in the war. After surrendering to the Romans, he was held captive for two years and gained his freedom following Vespasian's accession in 69. In 70, he accompanied Titus during the siege of Jerusalem, and in 71 he moved to Rome, where he received Roman citizenship and the name Flavius Josephus. He spent his later years living under imperial patronage and writing historical works.

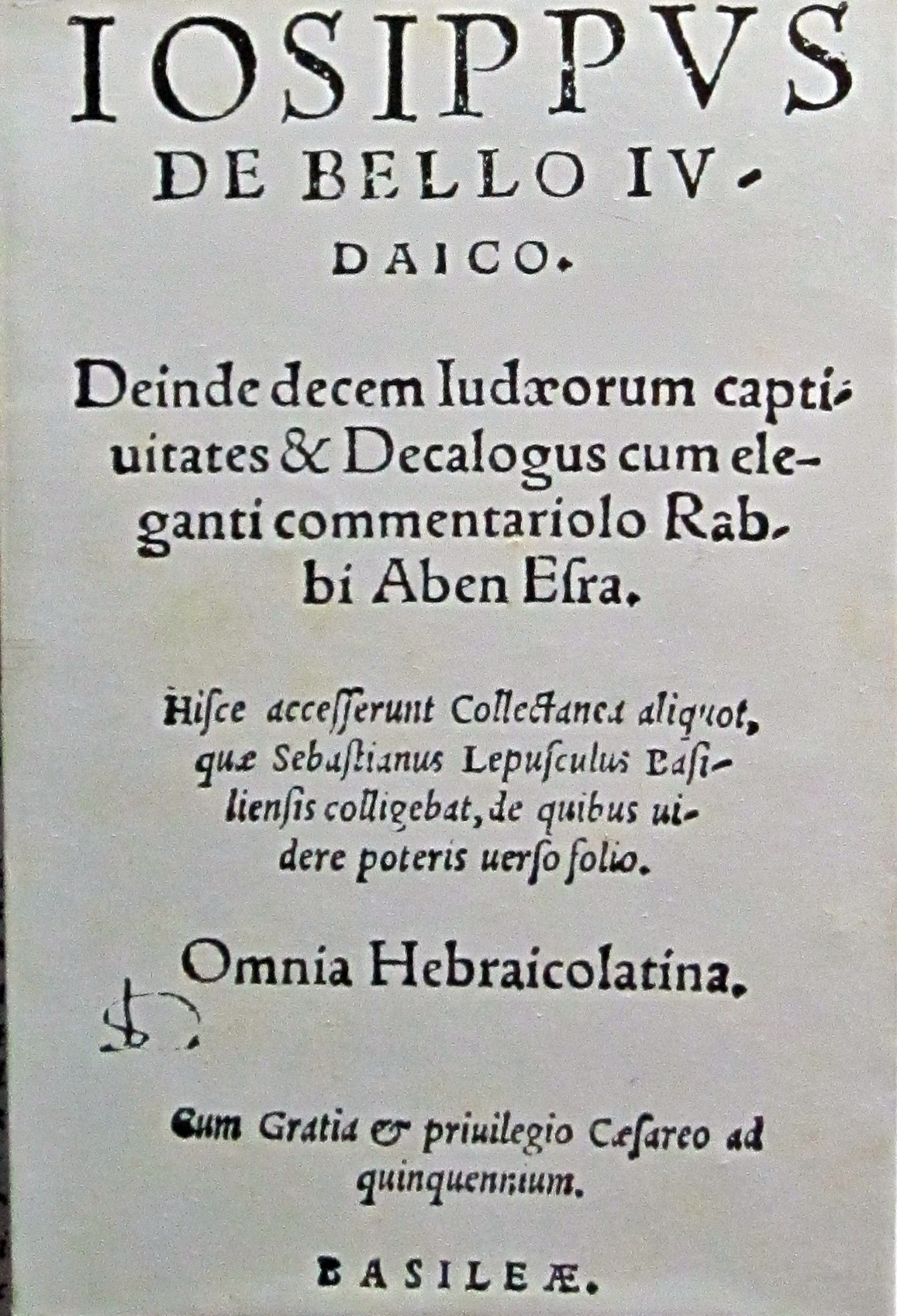
A sixteenth-century copy of The Jewish War, written by Josephus in the years following the revolt

Josephus' first work and primary account of the revolt, The Jewish War, completed by 79, chronicles the revolt in seven volumes. Originally in his native language, probably Aramaic, he later rewrote it in Greek with assistance. Claiming to correct biased accounts, Josephus also sought to deter future revolts. His firsthand experience, supplemented by accounts from deserters and Roman records, shaped his narrative. He minimized the collective responsibility of the Jewish people for the revolt, blaming a rebellious minority, (Note: Josephus condemned all factions involved in the war, holding them directly responsible for the conflict, labeling their leaders as 'tyrants,' characterizing them as brigands (leistai), and accusing them of godlessness and impiety.) corrupt and brutal Roman governors, and divine will. Taking pride in receiving endorsement from Vespasian and Titus for the accuracy of his writings; he was likely compelled to present his account in a manner that aligned with their messages or, at the very least, did not contradict them. (Note: Josephus, though careful not to directly criticize his Roman patrons, documented acts of brutal violence they committed, including the killing of prisoners of war.) At the same time, his experience as a participant and eyewitness, as well as his knowledge of both Jewish and Roman worlds, renders his account an invaluable historical source.

Josephus' later autobiography, The Life of Flavius Josephus, written as an appendix to another work, Antiquities of the Jews, focuses on his role in Galilee. It was a rebuttal to the now-lost A History of the Jewish War by Justus of Tiberias, which was published twenty years after the revolt, and which challenged Josephus's earlier narrative and religiosity. In Life, Josephus provides a detailed account of the events of 66–67, which contrasts with his first work, revealing differences in the portrayal of events.

Aside from Josephus, the written sources for the revolt are limited. Tacitus' Histories, written in the early second century, offers a detailed Jewish history in Book 5 as a prelude to the revolt, though his siege narrative is incomplete. Cassius Dio's account in Book 66 survives only in epitomes, while Suetonius provides occasional remarks. These sources complement and sometimes contradict Josephus, helping to refine and corroborate his account where its reliability is debated. Rabbinic literature offers insights into the war but presents challenges for historians, as it was primarily legal and theological, not historical. Oral transmission often embellished events for religious or ethical reasons, though some descriptions, like those of the famine in Jerusalem, align with external sources, confirming parts of the historical narrative.

More information on the revolt can be deduced from archaeological, numismatic, and documentary evidence. Excavations at sites destroyed during the war reveal military tactics, preparations, and the impact of the sieges and battles. Jewish revolt coins reflect rebel ideology, messaging, and aims. Texts such as the documents from Wadi Murabba'at, featuring dating formulas and phrases similar to revolt coinage, shed light on daily life and legal matters during the uprising.

== See also ==
=== Jewish–Roman wars ===
- Diaspora Revolt (115–117 CE)
  - Kitos War
- Bar Kokhba Revolt (132–136 CE)

=== Later Jewish and Samaritan revolts ===
- Jewish revolt against Constantius Gallus (352)
- Samaritan revolts (484–572)
- Jewish revolt against Heraclius (614–617/625)

=== Related topics ===
- First Jewish Revolt coinage
- History of the Jews in the Roman Empire
- List of conflicts in the Near East
- List of Jewish civil wars
