= Zechariah ben Abkilus =

Talmud rabbi

- זכריה בן אבקולס

Personal life
- Born: Zechariah ben Abkilus
- Died: Jerusalem, Land of Israel
- Era: Second Temple period

Religious life
- Religion: Judaism

Zechariah ben Abkilus (Hebrew: רבי זכריה בן אבקולס, also Zechariah ben Abqilus, Zecharya ben Avkulas, Amphikalos) was a Jewish scholar at the end of the Second Temple period. He lived in Jerusalem at the time of the destruction of the Second Temple. According to the Talmud, the authority which he enjoyed among the rabbis of Jerusalem was the cause of the downfall of the city. According to Lamentations Rabbah, Zechariah was present at the banquet famous for the affair of Kamsa and Bar Kamsa; and though his influence might have prevented the disgrace of Bar Ḳamtza, he did not exercise it. According to the Talmudic account of the episode, when a calf sent by the emperor was blemished by Bar Ḳamtza prior to being received as an offering to the Temple, the Rabbis would have accepted it to frustrate Bar Ḳamtza, had not Zechariah, ruled against this out of concern of setting an erroneous precedent for later generations.

The people wished to kill Bar Ḳamtza so that he should not be able to tell the emperor of the refusal, but Zechariah once more restrained them from carrying out their design out of concern for setting a dangerous precedent. R. Johanan, on the other hand, or, according to another source, R. Jose, declared that the humility of Zechariah b. Abḳilus, in refusing to cast his vote, caused the destruction of the Temple. He is recorded as following neither the Bet Hillel nor the Bet Shammai with regard to holding date-stones on the Sabbath. He is probably referred to by Josephus.
