= Judaea Capta coinage =

Coins issued by Roman Emperor Vespasian

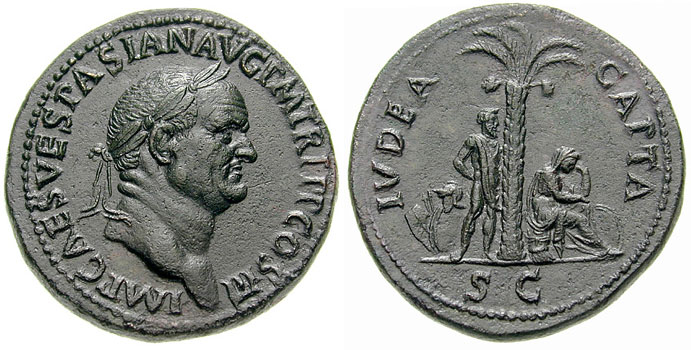
'Judea Capta' sestertius of Vespasian, struck in AD 71 to celebrate the victory in the Jewish Revolt. The inscription on the reverse says: IVDEA CAPTA, "Judaea conquered".

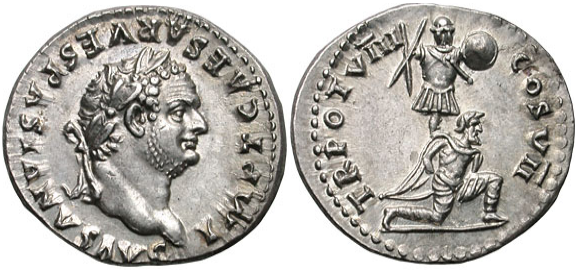
Roman denarius depicting Titus, c. 79. The reverse commemorates his triumph in the Judaean wars, representing a captive kneeling in front of a trophy of arms.

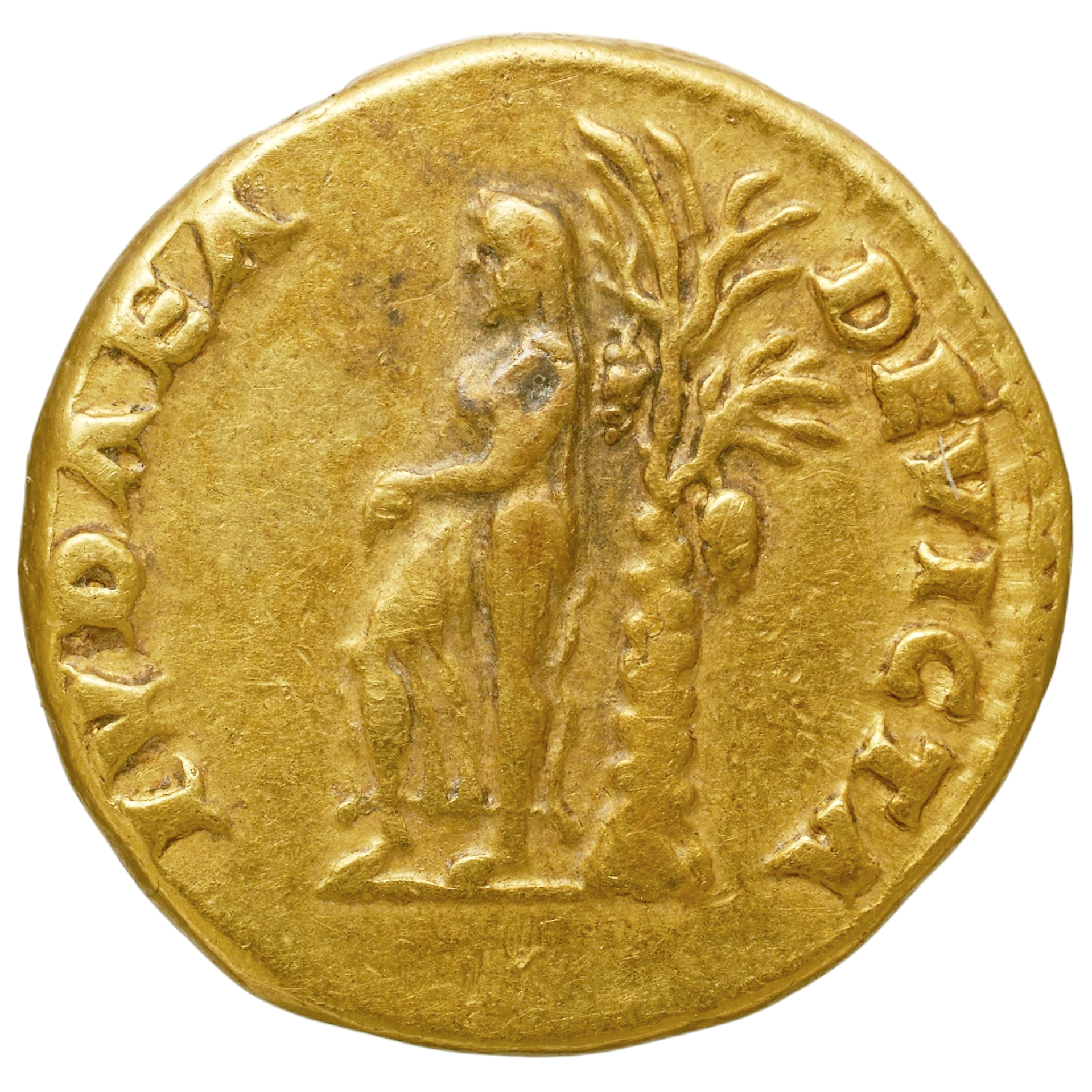
Aureus of Vespasian, IVDAEA DEVICTA

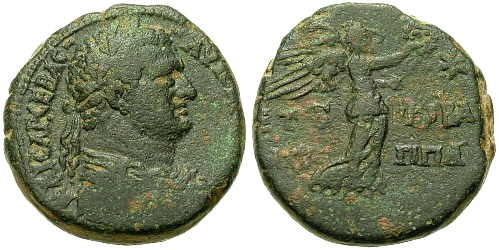
'Judaea Capta' coin issued by Agrippa II

Judaea Capta coins (also spelled Judea Capta, and, on many of the coins, IVDAEA CAPTA) were a series of commemorative coins originally issued by the Roman emperor Vespasian to celebrate the capture of Judaea and the destruction of the Second Jewish Temple by his son Titus in AD 70 during the First Jewish Revolt. There are several variants of the coinage. The reverse of the coins may show a female seated right in an attitude of mourning at the base of a palm tree, with either a captive bearded male standing left, with his hands bound behind his back, or the standing figure of the victorious emperor, or the goddess Victoria, with a trophy of weapons, shields, and helmets to the left.

At the bottom of some coins appear the initials SC which stand for Senatus consulto, "by decree of the Senate" - the emperor controlled gold and silver coins, and copper alloy coins were controlled by the Senate to guarantee their value.

== Inscription and imagery ==
The inscription appears in several versions, IUDAEA CAPTA ("Judaea [has been] conquered"/"conquered Judaea"), in rare cases the harsher IUDAEA DEVICTA or DEVICTA IUDAEA ("Judaea [has been] defeated"/"defeated Judaea"), and also DE IUDAEIS ("[the booty] from the Judaeans") and IUDAEA ("Judaea"). The inscription may also be in Greek, IOYΔAIAΣ EAΛΩKYIAΣ (Ioudaias Healōkyias), a translation of the Latin IUDAEA CAPTA, or it may sometimes be absent, in which case the assessment on whether the coin belongs to the series is made based on the typical imagery used by the mint.

The obverse of the coins typically featured portraits of either Vespasian or, more commonly, Titus. The reverse depicted symbolic imagery, including a mourning woman, representing the Jewish people, seated beneath a date palm, a symbol of Judaea. The palm tree can appear on the coin either in combination with the mourning woman, or without her. Andrea Moresino-Zipper contests that in the former case, it is the woman who symbolises the defeated Judaea and the palm stands for victorious Rome, while in the latter case the palm tree does represent Judaea.

== History ==
The Judaea Capta coins were struck for 25 years under Vespasian and his two sons who succeeded him as Emperor - Titus and Domitian. These commemorative coins were issued in bronze, silver and gold by mints in Rome, throughout the Roman Empire, and in Judaea itself. They were issued in every denomination, and at least 48 different types are known.

Only bronze 'Judaea Capta' coins were struck in Caesarea, in the defeated Roman province of Judaea. These coins are much cruder than the Roman issues, and the inscriptions are in Greek rather than Latin. The designs seems to have modified the imagery to avoid offending the Jewish population, omitting provocative motifs such as a half-naked captive. They feature the goddess Nike writing on a shield, Minerva with a spear, shield, trophy and palm tree, etc. Most such coins were issued during the reign of the Emperor Domitian (AD 81-96).

Unusually, a 'Judaea Capta' coin was also minted by the Jewish ruler Agrippa II, the great-grandson of Herod the Great. Brought up in Rome at the court of Claudius, Agrippa was thoroughly Romanised and was a close friend of Titus, whom he supported throughout the First Jewish Revolt. His bronze coin was minted at Tiberias and shows a portrait of Titus on the obverse with the Greek inscription ΚΑΙΣΑΡ ΣΕΒΑΣ ΑΥΤΟΚΡ ΤΙΤΟΣ (abbreviated for Καῖσαρ Σεβαστὸς Αυτοκράτωρ Τίτος, in Latin: Caesar Augustus Imperator Titus), while the reverse depicted the goddess Nike advancing right holding a wreath and palm branch over her shoulder, with a star in upper right field and the inscription 'ETO - KS BA AGRI-PPA'.

== Legacy ==
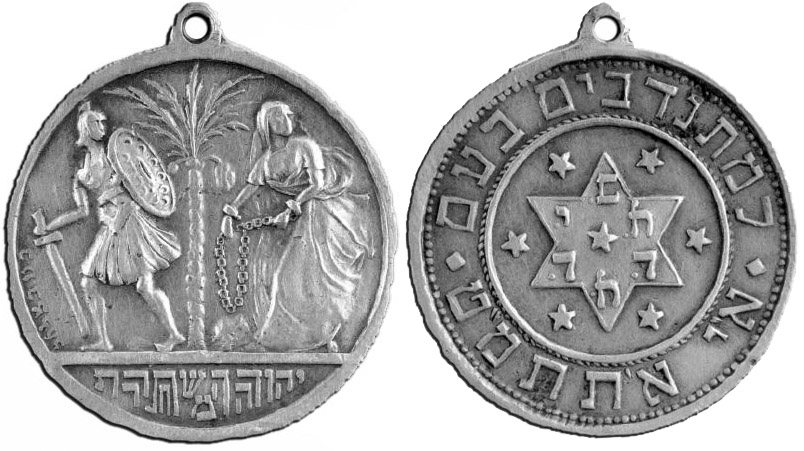
"Judea Being Liberated" medal, 1918

During the First World War, the imagery of the Judaea Capta coinage was adapted by supporters of the Jewish Legion, a Jewish volunteer force that served in the British Army. A medal presented to recruits of the 38th Royal Fusiliers battalion, known in the Jewish press as "Judeans", inverted the original Roman imagery. Instead of "Judaea Capta", the inscription was replaced with the Hebrew Yehuda Hamishtahreret ("Judea Being Liberated"). The medal depicts a fleeing Roman soldier alongside a female figure representing Israel, rising from subjugation.

== See also ==
- Arch of Titus
- First Jewish Revolt coinage
- Bar Kokhba revolt coinage
- First Jewish–Roman War
- Jewish–Roman wars
- List of historical currencies
- Fall of Masada
- Second Temple
- Siege of Jerusalem
- Temple in Jerusalem
