= Kingship of God (Judaism) =

The concept of kingship of God appears in the Hebrew Bible with references to "his Kingdom" and "your Kingdom" while the term "kingdom of God" is not directly used. "Yours is the kingdom, O Lord" is used in 1Chronicles 29:10–12 and "His kingdom is an everlasting kingdom" in Daniel 4:3, for example. It is tied to Jewish understanding that through the messiah, God will restore the Kingdom of Israel, following the Davidic covenant.

The "enthronement psalms" (Psalms 45, 93, 96, 97-99) provide a background for this view with the exclamation "The Lord is King". However, in later Judaism (after the destruction of the First Temple) a more "national" view was assigned to God's kingship in which the awaited messiah may be seen as a liberator and the founder of a new state of Israel.

Jeremiah 46:18, Jeremiah 48:15 and Jeremiah 51:57 each use the phraseology of "the King, whose name is the LORD of hosts".

1 Kings 22:19, Isaiah 6, Ezekiel 1 and Daniel 7:9 all speak of the Throne of God, although some philosophers such as Saadia Gaon and Maimonides interpreted such mention of a "throne" as allegory.

== Samuel and King ==
The foundation of kingship in Israel was the covenant between God and Israel as a reluctant Samuel presented the first king, Saul. The kingship resembled a constitutional design rather than a Near Eastern sacral kingship.

== Second Temple Judaism ==
The phrase "kingdom of the LORD" occurs in the Greek Septuagint where the Hebrew Bible has Solomon reigning over the "kingdom of YHWH."

=== Hellenistic Judaism and Alexandria ===
The phrase "kingdom of God" occurs once in the deuterocanonical books of the biblical apocrypha, in Wisdom of Solomon 10:10, where Wisdom shows a straying man "the kingdom of God." This is similar to Philo who refers to "kingdom of God" in a sapiential, wisdom-sense "formed in the image of its archetype the kingdom of God" (On The Special Laws 4:164)

=== Palestinian Judaism and Dead Sea scrolls ===
The pseudepigraphical Testaments of the Twelve Patriarchs refer to the "kingdom of the Lord" (Testament of Benjamin 9.1) The "kingdom" in the War Scroll of the Dead Sea scrolls, and other mentions of "kingdom" and "rule" are linked with Messianic expectations, and the establishment of a military-political kingdom on earth.

=== Aramaic Targums ===
The Aramaic Targums, paraphrase-translations of the Hebrew Bible for use in Palestinian synagogues, contain several expansions and additional references to "the kingdom of God" not emphasized in the Hebrew Masoretic Text. An example is Targum Neofiti's paraphrase of Exodus 15:18. Where the Hebrew has only "The LORD shall reign for ever and ever", the Aramaic paraphrase has "How the crown of the kingdom (Aramaic "kingdom" malku מַלְכּוּ, corresponds to Hebrew malkut מַלְכוּת) becomes you, O Lord! ... Of the Lord is the kingdom before the world and forever and ever." The turning of Hebrew Bible references to God "reigning" into concrete references to a "kingdom" of God occurs in many Targum passages.

== Rabbinic Judaism ==
Listings of kingdom references in the Mishnah and subsequent rabbinic literature can be found in Dalman, Words of Jesus, pages 96–101, and Hermann Leberecht Strack, Paul Billerbeck Kommentar zum Neuen Testament aus Talmud und Midrasch (1965).

== See also ==
- Jewish eschatology
- Kingship and kingdom of God
