= Kamsa and Bar Kamsa =

Story regarding the destruction of the Second Temple

The story of Kamsa and Bar Kamsa (or Kamtza and Bar Kamtza) (Hebrew: קמצא ובר קמצא) is the most famous midrash (rabbinic literature) regarding the destruction of the Second Temple in Jerusalem in the 1st century CE. The story appears in the Babylonian Talmud, and in the Midrash.

== The story ==
The story, as it appears in Tractate Gittin, tells of a wealthy man who lived in the 1st century CE. For an upcoming party he sent his servant to deliver an invitation to his friend, a man named Kamsa. However, the servant mistakes the recipient as Bar Kamsa, an enemy of the wealthy man. Upon seeing the hated Bar Kamsa at his party, the host orders him to leave. Bar Kamsa, attempting to save face, thrice offers to make peace with the host, first offering to pay for the food he eats, then for half of the expenses of the party, and then for the entire party, each time rebuffed by the angry host. Finally, the host forcibly removes Bar Kamsa, in the presence of the communal leaders present who lacked the courage to protest his shameful actions (from the context, it seems like the host was an affluent and politically powerful individual).

Humiliated, Bar Kamsa vows revenge against the rabbis present who did not defend him allowing him to be publicly humiliated. He visits the Roman Caesar who controls the region and tells him that the Jews are inciting to revolt against the Roman Empire. The Caesar, unsure of whether to believe Bar Kamsa, sends an animal to be sacrificed as a peace offering in the Temple in Jerusalem along with Bar Kamsa. On the way, Bar Kamsa purposefully slightly wounds the animal in a way that would disqualify it as a Jewish sacrifice but not as a Roman offering.

Upon seeing the disfigured animal, the rabbis of the Sanhedrin present at the Temple have to make a decision as to how to respond to the delicate situation presented. Some advocate dispensing with the law and offering the animal anyway to avoid war. This plan is vetoed by Rabbi Zecharia ben Avkolos who fears that people will begin to bring blemished animals to the Temple to be sacrificed. They then suggest putting Bar Kamsa to death to prove that he is at fault, but Rabbi Zecharia ben Avkolos again refuses, because this is not the mandated penalty for intentionally bringing a disqualified offering to the Temple.

Rabbi Yochanan says because of the actions of Rabbi Zecharia ben Avkolos the Temple was destroyed and the Jews were exiled from the land.

The Caesar, incensed, sent an army to lay siege to Jerusalem, eventually leading to its downfall in the year 70 C.E. Josephus (Wars II, 17:2) also ascribes the beginning of the war to the refusal to accept the offering of the Emperor. The Talmudic record is meant to illustrate how internal tensions among the Jewish people exacerbated the external threat from the Roman conquerors.

== Notes ==
The term "bar" denotes "son of". People were referred to as Name son of Name. Therefore, the English would be the story of Kamsa [son of Ploni] and [Ploni] son of Kamsa although the Maharsha notes that they were father and son and therefore that was the reason for the confusion: the son thought that the inviter wanted to make peace with him since he was his father's friend.

Josephus in his autobiography mentions a certain Kompsos son of Kompsos (Kομψόç) as a rich moderate leader in Tiberias. It might be the same man.

== Earlier similar event ==
In 175 BCE the Hellenized progressive Jews, the Tobiads, implored Antiochus IV Epiphanes to attack Jerusalem. It resulted in much bloodshed, pillage and defilement of the Sanctuary.

== See also ==
- Destruction of the Second Temple
- Tisha B'Av
- Baseless hatred
