= Josephus =

Roman–Jewish historian and military leader (c. 37 – c. 100)

Flavius Josephus
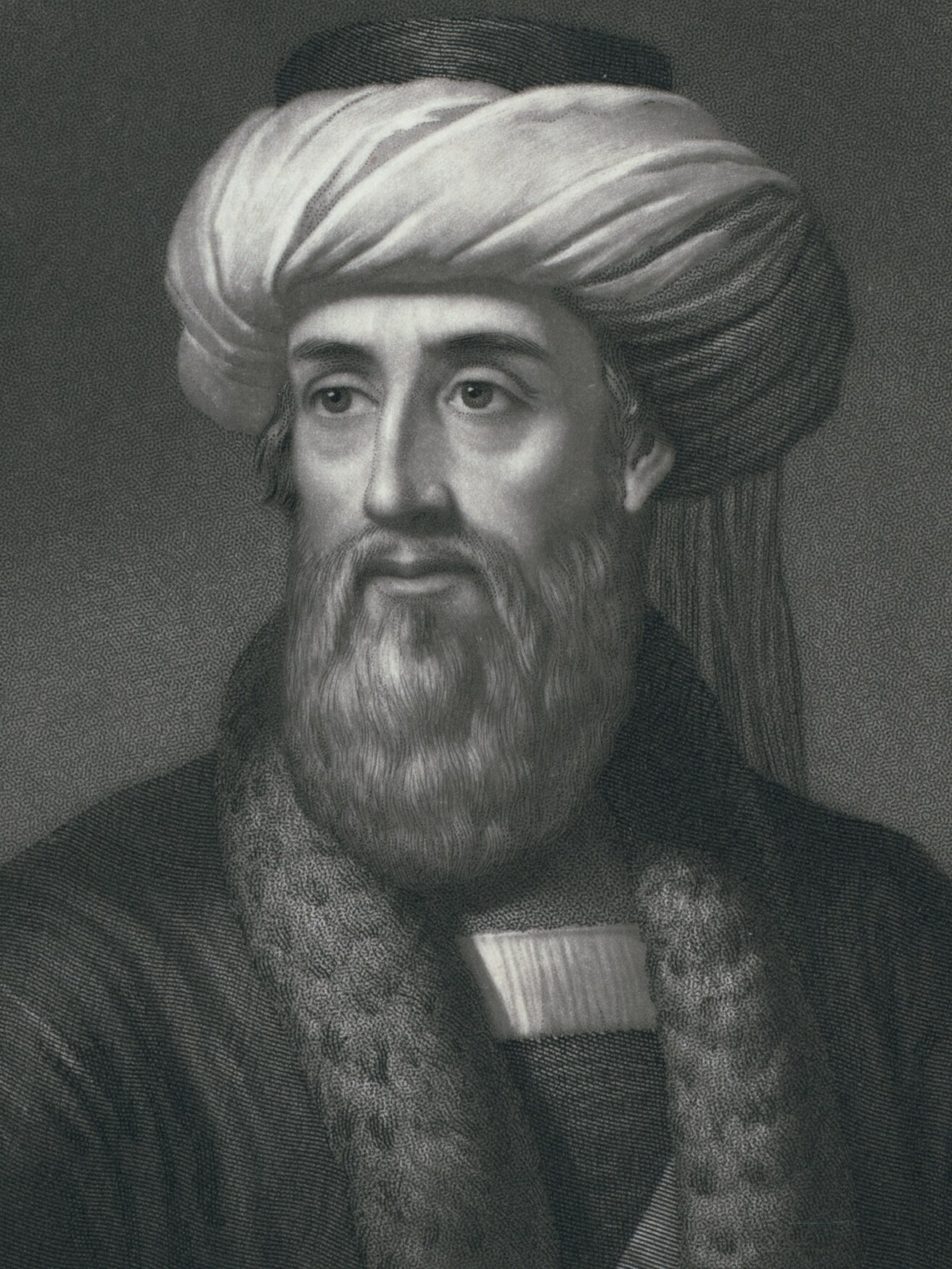
- Engraving by John Sartain, 1880
- Born: Yosef ben Matityahu c. AD 36; Jerusalem, Roman Judea
- Died: c. AD 100 (aged 63–64)
- Children: 5 sons, including: Flavius Hyrcanus; Flavius Justus; Flavius Simonides Agrippa

Academic background
- Influences: Philo of Alexandria; Pharisees; Greco-Roman world

Academic work
- Era: Hellenistic Judaism
- Main interests: Jewish history; Maccabean Revolt; Jewish–Roman wars; Herodian dynasty; Hasmonean dynasty
- Notable works: The Jewish War; Antiquities of the Jews
- Influenced: Early Christianity; Josephus problem

Flavius Josephus (Note: /dʒoʊˈsiːfəs/) (Note: Ancient Greek: Ἰώσηπος, romanized: Iṓsēpos) (born Yosef ben Mattityahu; (Note: Hebrew: יוֹסֵף בֵּן מַתִּתְיָהוּ) (Note: Modern authors give his birth name, including patronymic, as "Yosef ben Mattityahu", “Yoseph bar Mattityahu" or "Yosef ben Matityahu", literally meaning "Joseph son of Matthias". That is what he calls himself at the start of The Jewish War (Ἰώσηπος Ματθίου παῖς, Iósipos Matthíou país). "Flavius" was not part of his birth name, and was only adopted later.) c. AD 36 – c. 100) was a Roman–Jewish historian and military leader. Best known for writing The Jewish War, he was born in Jerusalem—then part of the Roman province of Judea—to a father of priestly descent and a mother who claimed Hasmonean royal ancestry.

He initially fought against the Roman Empire during the First Jewish–Roman War as general of the Jewish forces in Galilee, until surrendering in AD 67 to the Roman army led by Vespasian after the six-week siege of Yodfat. After Vespasian became emperor in AD 69, which Josephus suggested fulfilled prophecy, he granted Josephus his freedom, at which time he assumed the emperor's family name of Flavius. Flavius Josephus fully defected to the Roman side and was granted Roman citizenship. He became an advisor and close associate of Vespasian's son Titus, serving as his translator during Titus's protracted siege of Jerusalem in AD 70, which resulted in the near-total razing of the city and the destruction of the Second Temple.

Josephus recorded the Great Jewish Revolt (AD 66–70), including the siege of Masada. Some notable works were The Jewish War (c. 75), Antiquities of the Jews (c. 94), and his autobiography, The Life of Flavius Josephus (c. 94–99). The Jewish War recounts the Jewish revolt against Roman occupation. Antiquities of the Jews recounts the history of the world from a Jewish perspective for an ostensibly Greek and Roman audience. His autobiography recounts details of his whole life and most on his tenure as commander of Galilee during the revolt against Rome. These works provide insight into first-century Judaism and the background of Early Christianity. Josephus's works are the chief source next to the Bible for the history and antiquity of ancient Israel and Judea during the Second Temple period. They also provide extra-biblical accounts of figures such as Pontius Pilate, Herod the Great, John the Baptist, James, brother of Jesus, and Jesus of Nazareth.

== Biography ==
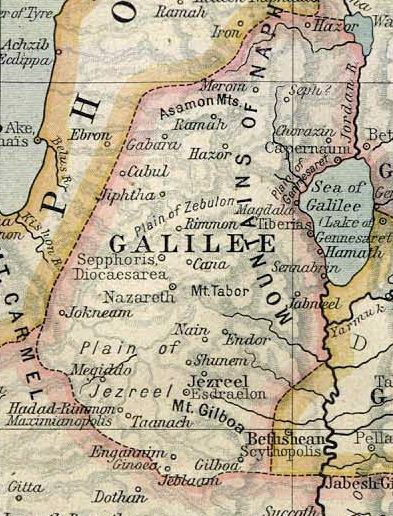
Galilee, site of Josephus's governorship, before the First Jewish–Roman War

Josephus was born into one of Jerusalem's elite families. He was the second-born son of Matthias, a Jewish priest. His older full-blooded brother was also, like his father, called Matthias. Their mother was an aristocratic woman who was descended from the royal and formerly ruling Hasmonean dynasty. Josephus's paternal grandparents were a man also named Joseph(us) and his wife—an unnamed Hebrew noblewoman—distant relatives of each other. Josephus's family was wealthy. He descended through his father from the priestly order of the Jehoiarib, which was the first of the 24 orders of priests in the Temple in Jerusalem. Josephus calls himself a fourth-generation descendant of "High Priest Jonathan", referring to either Jonathan Apphus or Alexander Jannaeus. He was raised in Jerusalem and educated alongside his brother.

At around 26 years old, Josephus traveled to Rome to negotiate the release of Jewish priests imprisoned there by Nero. With the assistance of Nero's wife, Poppaea, and a Jewish actor, he succeeded in securing their freedom. Upon his return to Jerusalem, at the outbreak of the First Jewish–Roman War, Josephus was appointed the military governor of Galilee. His arrival in Galilee, however, was fraught with internal division: the inhabitants of Sepphoris and Tiberias opted to maintain peace with the Romans; the people of Sepphoris enlisted the help of the Roman army to protect their city, while the people of Tiberias appealed to King Agrippa's forces to protect them from the insurgents. Josephus trained 65,000-100,000 troops in the region.

Josephus also contended with John of Gischala who had also set his sight over the control of Galilee. Like Josephus, John had amassed to himself a large band of supporters from Gischala (Gush Halab) and Gabara, (Note: A large village in Galilee during the 1st century AD, located to the north of Nazareth. In antiquity, the town was called "Garaba", but in Josephus's historical works of antiquity, the town is mentioned by its Greek corruption, "Gabara".) including the support of the Sanhedrin in Jerusalem. Meanwhile, Josephus fortified several towns and villages in Lower Galilee, among which were Tiberias, Bersabe, Selamin, Japha, and Tarichaea, in anticipation of a Roman onslaught. In Upper Galilee, he fortified the towns of Jamnith, Seph, Mero, and Achabare, among other places. Josephus, with the Galileans under his command, managed to bring both Sepphoris and Tiberias into subjection, but was eventually forced to relinquish his hold on Sepphoris by the arrival of Roman forces under Placidus the tribune and later by Vespasian himself. Josephus first engaged the Roman army at a village called Garis, where he launched an attack against Sepphoris a second time, before being repulsed. At length, he resisted the Roman army in its siege of Yodfat (Jotapata) until it fell to the Roman army in the lunar month of Tammuz, in the thirteenth year of Nero's reign.

After the Jewish garrison of Yodfat fell under siege, the Romans invaded, killing thousands; the survivors committed suicide. According to Josephus, he was trapped in a cave with 40 of his companions in July AD 67. The Romans (commanded by Flavius Vespasian and his son Titus, both subsequently Roman emperors) asked the group to surrender, but they refused. According to Josephus's account, he suggested a method of collective suicide; they drew lots and killed each other, one by one, and Josephus happened to be one of two men that were left who surrendered to the Roman forces and became prisoners. (Note: This method as a mathematical problem is referred to as the Josephus problem, or Roman roulette.) Josephus claimed, while being confined at Yodfat, to have experienced a divine revelation that later led to his speech predicting Vespasian would become emperor. After the prediction came true, he was released or kept as a slave (and possibly interpreter) by Vespasian, who considered his gift of prophecy to be divine. In AD 69, Josephus was released. According to his account, he acted as a negotiator with the defenders during the siege of Jerusalem in AD 70, during which time his parents were held as hostages by Simon bar Giora. Josephus wrote that his revelation had taught him three things: that God, the creator of the Jewish people, had decided to "punish" them; that "fortune" had been given to the Romans; and that God had chosen him "to announce the things that are to come". To many Jews, such claims were simply self-serving.

Josephus interpreted the destruction of the Temple as a sign that God had turned to the Romans due to Jewish sins, urging submission to Roman authority. However, he also believed that the covenant between God and Israel remained intact, with restoration dependent on Jewish repentance, echoing biblical interpretations of the First Temple's destruction.

In AD 71, he went to Rome as part of the entourage of Titus. There, he became a Roman citizen and client of the ruling Flavian dynasty. In addition to Roman citizenship, he was granted accommodation in the conquered Judaea and a pension. While in Rome and under Flavian patronage, Josephus wrote all of his known works. Although he only ever calls himself "Josephus" in his writings, later historians refer to him as "Flavius Josephus", confirming that he adopted the nomen Flavius from his patrons, as was the custom amongst freedmen.

Vespasian arranged for Josephus to marry a captured Jewish woman, whom he later divorced. Around the year 71, Josephus married an Alexandrian Jewish woman as his third wife. They had three sons, of whom only Flavius Hyrcanus survived childhood. Josephus later divorced his third wife. Around 75, he married his fourth wife, a Greek Jewish woman from Crete, who was a member of a distinguished family. They had two sons, Flavius Justus and Flavius Simonides Agrippa.

Josephus's life story remains ambiguous. He was described by Harris in 1985 as a law-observant Jew who believed in the compatibility of Judaism and Graeco-Roman thought, commonly referred to as Hellenistic Judaism. Josippon, the Hebrew version of Josephus, contains changes. His critics were never satisfied as to why his suicide attempt did not kill him in Galilee, and after his capture, accepted the patronage of Romans.

== Scholarship and impact on history ==
The works of Josephus provide information about the First Jewish–Roman War and also represent literary source material for understanding the context of the Dead Sea Scrolls and late Temple Judaism.

Josephan scholarship had traditionally identified him as a Pharisee. Some authors portrayed him as a member of the sect and as a traitor to the Jewish nation—a view which became known as the classical concept of Josephus. In the mid-20th century, scholars challenged this view and formulated the modern concept of Josephus. They consider him a Pharisee but describe him in part as patriot and a historian of some standing. In his 1991 book, Steve Mason argued that Josephus was not a Pharisee but an orthodox Aristocrat-Priest who became associated with the philosophical school of the Pharisees as a matter of deference, and not by willing association.

=== Impact on history and archaeology ===
The works of Josephus include useful material for historians about individuals, groups, customs, and geographical places. However, modern historians have been cautious of taking his writings at face value. For example, Carl Ritter, in his highly influential Erdkunde in the 1840s, wrote in a review of authorities on the ancient geography of the region:

Outside of the Scriptures, Josephus holds the first and the only place among the native authors of Judaea; for Philo of Alexandria, the later Talmud, and other authorities, are of little service in understanding the geography of the country. Josephus is, however, to be used with great care. As a Jewish scholar, as an officer of Galilee, as a military man, and a person of great experience in everything belonging to his own nation, he attained to that remarkable familiarity with his country in every part, which his antiquarian researches so abundantly evince. But he was controlled by political motives: his great purpose was to bring his people, the despised Jewish race, into honour with the Greeks and Romans; and this purpose underlay every sentence, and filled his history with distortions and exaggerations.

Josephus mentions that in his day there were 240 towns and villages scattered across Upper and Lower Galilee, some of which he names. Josephus's works are the primary source for the chain of Jewish high priests during the Second Temple period. A few of the Jewish customs named by him include the practice of hanging a linen curtain at the entrance to one's house, and the Jewish custom to partake of a Sabbath-day's meal around the sixth-hour of the day (at noon). He notes also that it was permissible for Jewish men to marry many wives (polygamy).

Josephus's writings provide a significant, extra-Biblical account of the post-Exilic period of the Maccabees, the Hasmonean dynasty, and the rise of Herod the Great. He also describes the Sadducees, the Pharisees and Essenes, the Herodian Temple, Quirinius's census and the Zealots, and such figures as Pontius Pilate, Herod the Great, Agrippa I and Agrippa II, John the Baptist, James the brother of Jesus, and Jesus. Josephus represents an important source for studies of immediate post-Temple Judaism and the context of early Christianity.

A careful reading of Josephus's writings and years of excavation allowed Ehud Netzer, an archaeologist from Hebrew University, to discover what he considered to be the location of Herod's Tomb, after searching for 35 years. It was above aqueducts and pools, at a flattened desert site, halfway up the hill to the Herodium, 12 km south of Jerusalem—as described in Josephus's writings. In October 2013, archaeologists Joseph Patrich and Benjamin Arubas challenged the identification of the tomb as that of Herod. According to Patrich and Arubas, the tomb is too modest to be Herod's and has several unlikely features. Roi Porat, who replaced Netzer as excavation leader after the latter's death, stood by the identification.

Josephus's writings provide the first-known source for many stories considered as Biblical history, despite not being found in the Bible or related material. These include Ishmael as the founder of the Arabs, the connection of "Semites", "Hamites" and "Japhetites" to the classical nations of the world, and the story of the siege of Masada.

=== Josephus's original audience ===
Scholars debate about Josephus's intended audience. For example, Antiquities of the Jews could be written for Jews—"a few scholars from Laqueur onward have suggested that Josephus must have written primarily for fellow Jews (if also secondarily for Gentiles). The most common motive suggested is repentance: in later life he felt so bad about the traitorous War that he needed to demonstrate ... his loyalty to Jewish history, law and culture." However, Josephus's "countless incidental remarks explaining basic Judean language, customs and laws ... assume a Gentile audience. He does not expect his first hearers to know anything about the laws or Judean origins." The issue of who would read this multi-volume work is unresolved. Other possible motives for writing Antiquities could be to dispel the misrepresentation of Jewish origins or as an apologetic to Greek cities of the Diaspora in order to protect Jews and to Roman authorities to garner their support for the Jews facing persecution.

Later rabbinic authorities condemned or marginalized Josephus, and he is largely absent from traditional Jewish sources until Isaac Abarbanel, who was fluent in Latin and differentiated between the different compositions of Josephus, one addressed to the Jews in Hebrew and another in Greek and Latin. In some places Abarbanel refers to Joseph ben Gurion but appears to be referencing the Sefer Yosippon.

=== Literary influence and translations ===
Josephus was a very popular writer with Christians in the 4th century and beyond as an independent source to the events before, during, and after the life of Jesus of Nazareth. Josephus was always accessible in the Greek-reading Eastern Mediterranean. His works were translated into Latin, but often in abbreviated form such as Pseudo-Hegesippus's 4th century Latin version of The Jewish War (Bellum Judaicum). Christian interest in The Jewish War was largely out of interest in the downfall of the Jews and the Second Temple, which was widely considered by Christians to be divine punishment for the crime of killing Jesus.

Improvements in printing technology (the Gutenberg Press) led to Josephus's works receiving a number of new translations into the vernacular languages of Europe, generally based on the Latin versions. Only in 1544 did a version of the standard Greek text of The Jewish War become available in French, edited by the Dutch humanist Arnoldus Arlenius. The first English translation, by Thomas Lodge, appeared in 1602, with subsequent editions appearing throughout the 17th century. The 1544 Greek edition formed the basis of the 1732 English translation by William Whiston, which achieved enormous popularity in the English-speaking world. It was often the book (after the Bible) that Christians most frequently owned. Whiston claimed that certain works by Josephus had a similar style to the Epistles of St. Paul. Later editions of the Greek text include that of Benedikt Niese, who made a detailed examination of all the available manuscripts, mainly from France and Spain. Henry St. John Thackeray and successors such as Ralph Marcus used Niese's version for the Loeb Classical Library edition widely used today.

On the Jewish side, Josephus was far more obscure, as he was perceived as a traitor. Rabbinical writings for a millennium after his death (e.g. the Mishnah) almost never call out Josephus by name, although they sometimes tell parallel tales of the same events that Josephus narrated. An Italian Jew writing in the 10th century indirectly brought Josephus back to prominence among Jews: he authored the Yosippon, which paraphrases Pseudo-Hegesippus's Latin version of The Jewish War, a Latin version of Antiquities, as well as other works. The epitomist also adds in his own snippets of history at times.

Jews generally distrusted Christian translations of Josephus until the Haskalah ("Jewish Enlightenment") in the 19th century, when sufficiently "neutral" vernacular language translations were made. Kalman Schulman finally created a Hebrew translation of the Greek text of Josephus in 1863, although many rabbis continued to prefer the Yosippon version. By the 20th century, Jewish attitudes toward Josephus had softened, as he gave the Jews a respectable place in classical history. Various parts of his work were reinterpreted as more inspiring and favorable to the Jews than the Renaissance translations by Christians had been. Notably, the last stand at Masada (described in The Jewish War), which past generations had deemed insane and fanatical, received a more positive reinterpretation as an inspiring call to action in this period.

The standard editio maior of the various Greek manuscripts is that of Benedictus Niese, published 1885–1895. The text of Antiquities is damaged in some places. In the Life, Niese follows mainly manuscript P, but refers also to AMW and R. Henry St. John Thackeray for the Loeb Classical Library has a Greek text also mainly dependent on P. André Pelletier edited a new Greek text for his translation of Life. The ongoing Münsteraner Josephus-Ausgabe of Münster University will provide a new critical apparatus. Late Old Slavonic translations of the Greek also exist, but these contain a large number of Christian interpolations.

=== Evaluation as a military commander ===
Author Joseph Raymond calls Josephus "the Jewish Benedict Arnold" for betraying his own troops at Jotapata, while historian Mary Smallwood, in the introduction to the translation of The Jewish War by G. A. Williamson, writes:

[Josephus] was conceited, not only about his own learning, but also about the opinions held of him as commander both by the Galileans and by the Romans; he was guilty of shocking duplicity at Jotapata, saving himself by sacrifice of his companions; he was too naive to see how he stood condemned out of his own mouth for his conduct, and yet no words were too harsh when he was blackening his opponents; and after landing, however involuntarily, in the Roman camp, he turned his captivity to his own advantage, and benefited for the rest of his days from his change of side.

== Historiography and Josephus ==
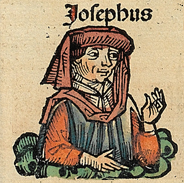
Josephus in the Nuremberg Chronicle, 1493

In the Preface to Jewish Wars, Josephus criticizes historians who misrepresent the events of the Jewish–Roman War, writing that "they have a mind to demonstrate the greatness of the Romans, while they still diminish and lessen the actions of the Jews." Josephus states that his intention is to correct this method but that he "will not go to the other extreme [and] will prosecute the actions of both parties with accuracy". Josephus confesses his inability to contain his sadness in transcribing these events; to illustrate that this will have little effect on his historiography, he suggests, "[I]f any one be inflexible in his censures of me, let him attribute the facts themselves to the historical part, and the lamentations to the writer himself only."

Josephus's preface to Antiquities offers his opinion early on, saying, "Upon the whole, a man that will peruse this history, may principally learn from it, that all events succeed well, even to an incredible degree, and the reward of felicity is proposed by God." After inserting this attitude, Josephus contradicts Berossus: "I shall accurately describe what is contained in our records, in the order of time that belongs to them ... without adding any thing to what is therein contained, or taking away any thing therefrom." He distinguishes between history and philosophy, stating, "[T]hose that read my book may wonder how it comes to pass, that my discourse, which promises an account of laws and historical facts, contains so much of philosophy."

In both works, Josephus emphasizes that accuracy is crucial to historiography. American classicist Louis H. Feldman notes that in Wars, Josephus commits himself to critical historiography, but in Antiquities, he shifts to rhetorical historiography, which was the norm of his time. Feldman notes that it is significant that Josephus called his later work "Antiquities" (literally, archaeology) rather than history; in the Hellenistic period, archaeology meant either "history from the origins or archaic history". Thus, his title implies a Jewish peoples' history from their origins until the time he wrote. This distinction is significant to Feldman, because "in ancient times, historians were expected to write in chronological order," while "antiquarians wrote in a systematic order, proceeding topically and logically" and included all relevant material for their subject. Antiquarians moved beyond political history to include institutions and religious and private life. Josephus offers this wider perspective in Antiquities.

== Works ==
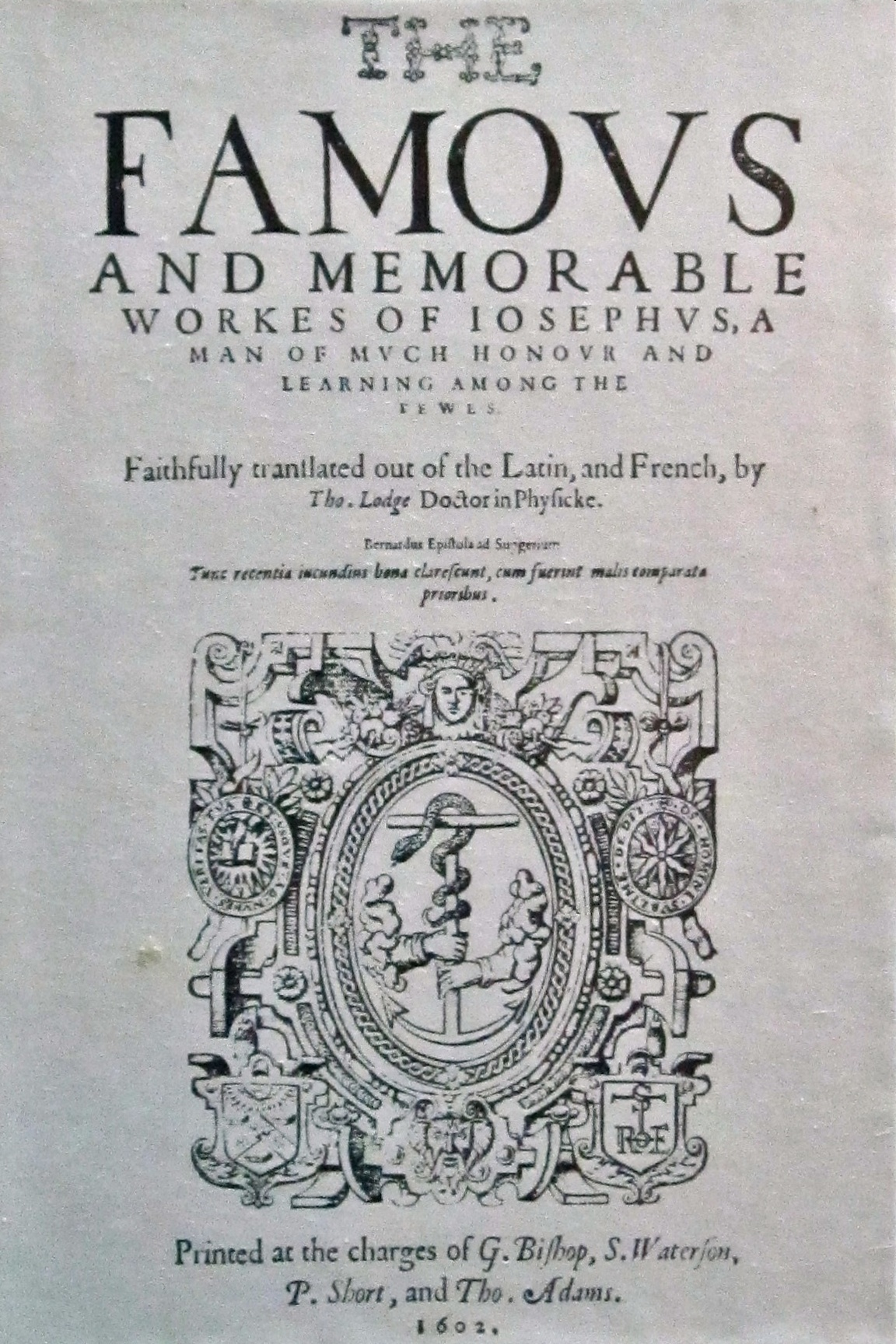
The works of Josephus translated by Thomas Lodge (1602)

The works of Josephus are major sources of our understanding of Jewish life and history during the first century.

- (c. 75) War of the Jews, The Jewish War, Jewish Wars, or History of the Jewish War (commonly abbreviated JW, BJ or War)
- (c. 94) Antiquities of the Jews, Jewish Antiquities, or Antiquities of the Jews/Jewish Archeology (frequently abbreviated AJ, AotJ or Ant. or Antiq.)
- (c. 97) Flavius Josephus Against Apion, Against Apion, Contra Apionem, or Against the Greeks, on the antiquity of the Jewish people (usually abbreviated CA)
- (c. 99) Life of Josephus, or Autobiography of Josephus (abbreviated Life or Vita)

Josephus planned several more works, but there is no evidence that these exist. These include:

- On Customs and Causes, a discussion and defense of Jewish Law. This three-volume series would also discuss God and his essence
- A revised edition of The Jewish War which he planned after completing Jewish Antiquities

=== The Jewish War ===
His first work in Rome was an account addressed to certain "upper barbarians"—usually thought to be the Jewish community in Mesopotamia—in his "paternal tongue" (War I.3), arguably the Western Aramaic language. In AD 78 he finished a seven-volume account, written in Greek, known as The Jewish War (Latin: Bellum Judaicum or De bello Judaico). The history starts with the period of the Maccabees and concludes with accounts of the fall of Jerusalem, and the subsequent fall of the fortresses of Herodion, Macharont and Masada and the Roman victory celebrations in Rome, the mopping-up operations, Roman military operations elsewhere in the empire and the uprising in Cyrene. Together with the account in his Life of some of the same events, it also provides the reader with an overview of Josephus's own part in the events since his return to Jerusalem from a brief visit to Rome in the early 60s (Life 13–17).

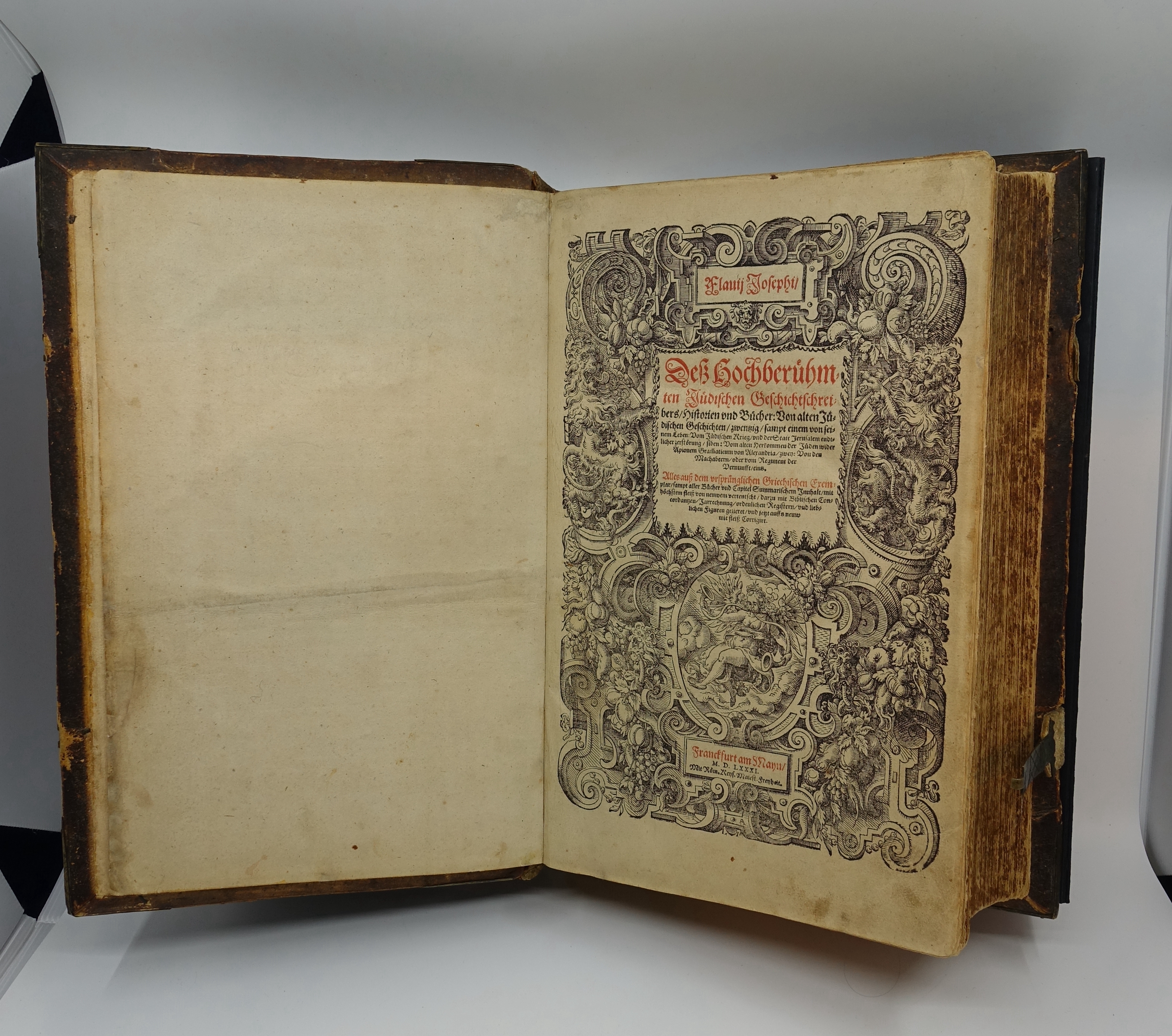
1581 German translation of Josephus's The Jewish War in the collection of the Jewish Museum of Switzerland

In the wake of the suppression of the Jewish revolt, Josephus would have witnessed the marches of Titus's triumphant legions leading their Jewish captives, and carrying treasures from the despoiled Temple in Jerusalem. It was against this background that Josephus wrote his War. He blames the Jewish War on what he calls "unrepresentative and over-zealous fanatics" among the Jews, who led the masses away from their traditional aristocratic leaders (like himself), with disastrous results. For example, Josephus writes that "Simon [bar Giora] was a greater terror to the people than the Romans themselves." Josephus also blames some of the Roman governors of Judea, representing them as corrupt and incompetent administrators.

=== Antiquities of the Jews ===
The next work by Josephus is his 20-volume Antiquities of the Jews, completed during the 13th year of the reign of the Emperor Flavius Domitian, around AD 93 to 94. In expounding Jewish history, law and custom, he is entering into many philosophical debates current in Rome at that time. Again he offers an apologia for the antiquity and universal significance of the Jewish people. Josephus claims to be writing this history because he "saw that others perverted the truth of those actions in their writings", those writings being the history of the Jews. In terms of some of his sources for the project, Josephus says that he drew from and "interpreted out of the Hebrew Scriptures" and that he was an eyewitness to the wars between the Jews and the Romans, which were earlier recounted in Jewish Wars.

He outlines Jewish history beginning with the creation, as passed down through Jewish historical tradition. Abraham taught science to the Egyptians, who, in turn, taught the Greeks. Moses set up a senatorial priestly aristocracy, which, like that of Rome, resisted monarchy. The great figures of the Tanakh are presented as ideal philosopher-leaders. He includes an autobiographical appendix defending his conduct at the end of the war when he cooperated with the Roman forces.

Louis H. Feldman outlines the difference between calling this work Antiquities of the Jews instead of History of the Jews. Although Josephus says that he describes the events contained in Antiquities "in the order of time that belongs to them," Feldman argues that Josephus "aimed to organize [his] material systematically rather than chronologically" and had a scope that "ranged far beyond mere political history to political institutions, religious and private life."

=== Life of Flavius Josephus ===
An autobiographical text written by Josephus in approximately AD 94–99 – possibly as an appendix to his Antiquities of the Jews (cf. Life 430) – where the author for the most part re-visits the events of the War and his tenure in Galilee as governor and commander, apparently in response to allegations made against him by Justus of Tiberias (cf. Life 336).

=== Against Apion ===
Josephus's Against Apion is a two-volume defence of Judaism as classical religion and philosophy, stressing its antiquity, as opposed to what Josephus claimed was the relatively more recent tradition of the Greeks. Some anti-Judaic allegations ascribed by Josephus to the Greek writer Apion and myths accredited to Manetho are also addressed.

=== Spurious works ===
- (date unknown) Josephus's Discourse to the Greeks concerning Hades (spurious; adaptation of "Against Plato, on the Cause of the Universe" by Hippolytus of Rome)

== In fiction ==
- The Josephus Trilogy, by Lion Feuchtwanger, about his career beginning in the year 60 in Rome.
  - Josephus (1932)
  - The Jew of Rome (1935)
  - Josephus and the Emperor (1942)

== See also ==
- Josephus on Jesus
- Josephus problem, a mathematical problem
- Josippon
- Pseudo-Philo

== Bibliography ==
- Attridge, Harold (1984). "Josephus and His Works". In Stone, Michael (ed.). The Literature of the Jewish People in the Period of the Second Temple and the Talmud: Jewish Writings of the Second Temple Period. Assen; Philadelphia: Van Gorcum; Fortress Press. ISBN 0800606035.
- Aune, David Edward (1991) [first published 1983]. Prophecy In Early Christianity and the Ancient Mediterranean World. William B. Eerdmans Publishing Company. ISBN 0-8028-0635-X.
- Bowman, Steven (1987). "Josephus in Byzantium". In Feldman, Louis H.; Hata, Gōhei (eds.). Josephus, Judaism and Christianity. Wayne State University Press. ISBN 90-04-08554-8.
- Ehrman, Bart D. (1999). Jesus: Apocalyptic Prophet of the New Millennium (Kindle ed.). Oxford University Press. ISBN 978-0-19-512474-3.
- Eisler, Robert; Krappe, Alexander Haggerty (1931). The Messiah Jesus and John the Baptist according to Flavius Josephus' recently rediscovered 'Capture of Jerusalem' and other Jewish and Christian sources. New York: L. MacVeagh, The Dial Press. OCLC 839607.
- Feldman, Louis H. (1998). Josephus's Interpretation of the Bible. Berkeley: University of California Press. ISBN 978-0-520-20853-7.
- Gnuse, Robert Karl (1996). Dreams & Dream Reports in the Writings of Josephus: A Traditio-Historical Analysis. E. J. Brill. ISBN 90-04-10616-2.
- Goodman, Martin (2007). Rome and Jerusalem: The Clash of Ancient Civilisations. Penguin Books. ISBN 978-0-7139-9447-6.
- Goodman, Martin (15 October 2019). Josephus's The Jewish War: A Biography. Vol. 33. Princeton University Press. doi:10.2307/j.ctvg252gj. ISBN 978-0-691-13739-1. JSTOR j.ctvg252gj. S2CID 242695900.
- Gray, Rebecca (1993). Prophetic Figures in Late Second Temple Jewish Palestine: The Evidence from Josephus. Oxford University Press. ISBN 0-19-507615-X.
- Harris, Stephen L. (1985). Understanding the Bible. Palo Alto: Mayfield. ISBN 978-0-87484-696-6.
- Josephus, Flavius (1737). The Antiquities of the Jews . Translated by Whiston, William – via Wikisource.
- Maier, Paul L., ed. (1999). "Appendix: Dissertation 6 (by Whiston)". The New Complete Works of Josephus. Kregel Academic. p. 1070. ISBN 978-0-8254-9692-9.
- Mason, Steve, ed. (1998). "Should Any Wish to Enquire Further (Ant. 1.25): The Aim and Audience of Josephus's Judean Antiquities/Life". Understanding Josephus: Seven Perspectives. Sheffield: Sheffield Academic Press. pp. 64–103. ISBN 1-85075-878-6.
- Mason, Steve, ed. (2000). Flavius Josephus: Translation and Commentary (10 vols. in 12 ed.). Leiden: Brill. ISBN 9789004117938.
- Millar, Fergus (1 May 2011). Cotton, Hannah M.; Rogers, Guy M. (eds.). Rome, the Greek World, and the East: Volume 3: The Greek World, the Jews, and the East. The University of North Carolina Press. ISBN 978-0-8078-7665-7. OCLC 646793155.
- Millard, Alan Ralph (1997). Discoveries From Bible Times: Archaeological Treasures Throw Light on The Bible. Lion Publishing. ISBN 0-7459-3740-3.
- Mimouni, Simon Claude (2012). Le judaïsme ancien du VIe siècle avant notre ère au IIIe siècle de notre ère: des prêtres aux rabbins [Ancient Judaism from the 6th century BCE to the 3rd century CE: from priests to rabbis] (Report) (in French). Paris: Presses Universitaires de France.
- Murphy, Catherine M. (2008). The Historical Jesus For Dummies. Wiley Publishing, Inc. ISBN 978-0-470-16785-4.
- Nodet, Etienne (1997). A Search for the Origins of Judaism: From Joshua to the Mishnah. Continuum International Publishing Group. ISBN 978-0-615-35508-5.
- Rappaport, Uriel (2006). יוחנן מגוש חלב : מהרי הגליל אל חומות ירושלים (Yoḥanan mi-Gush ḥalav : me-hare ha-Galil el ḥomot Yerushalayim) [John of Gischala, from the mountains of Galilee to the walls of Jerusalem]. (see https://www.academia.edu/2383453 for unofficial translation )
- Raymond, Joseph (2010). Herodian Messiah: Case For Jesus As Grandson of Herod. Tower Grover Publishing. ISBN 978-0-615-35508-5.
- Safrai, Ze'ev (1985). פרקי גליל בתקופת המשנה והתלמוד, מעלות [The Galilee in the time of the Mishna and Talmud] (in Hebrew) (2nd ed.). Jerusalem: Maʻalot Galil Educational Village.
- Schürer, Emil (1973) [1891]. Vermes, Géza; Millar, Fergus; Black, Matthew (eds.). The History of the Jewish People in the Age of Jesus Christ (175 B.C. – A.D. 135). Continuum International Publishing Group. ISBN 9780567022424. OCLC 912175.
