= Steve Mason (biblical scholar) =

Canadian biblical scholar (born 1957)

Steve N. Mason (born 1957) is a Canadian historian of Judea in the Graeco-Roman period, best known for his studies of Josephus and early Christian writings. He was professor of classics, history and religious studies at York University in Toronto. He has been Kirby Laing Chair of New Testament Exegesis at Aberdeen University (2011–2015?) and works today at the University of Groningen, the Netherlands.

== Works ==
=== Books ===
- Mason, Steve (1991). Flavius Josephus on the Pharisees: A Composition-Critical Study. Studia post-Biblica. Vol. 39. Leiden & New York: E.J. Brill. ISBN 978-90-04-09181-8. OCLC 22596881.
- ——— (1992). Josephus and the New Testament. Peabody, MA: Hendrickson Publishers. ISBN 978-0-943575-99-5. OCLC 26720248.
- ———; Robinson, Thomas A. (2004). Early Christian Reader: Christians text from the first and second centuries in contemporary English translations including the New Revised Standard Version of the New Testament. Peabody, MA: Hendrickson Publishers. ISBN 978-1-56563-043-7. OCLC 53306066.
- ——— (2009). Josephus, Judea and Christian Origins: Methods and Categories. Peabody, MA: Hendrickson Publishers. ISBN 978-1-59856-254-5. OCLC 237325090.
- ——— (2001). Flavius Josephus: Translation and Commentary - Volume 9 - Life of Josephus. Leiden & New York: E.J. Brill. ISBN 978-1-4237-1447-7. OCLC 60880336.
- ——— (2008). Flavius Josephus: Translation and Commentary - Volume 1b - Judean War 2. Leiden & New York: E.J. Brill. ISBN 978-90-04-16934-0. OCLC 612149295.
- ——— (2016). A History of the Jewish War, A.D. 66-74. Cambridge & New York: Cambridge University Press. ISBN 978-0-521-85329-3. OCLC 910936277.
- ——— (2016). Orientation to the History of Roman Judaea. Eugene, OR: Cascade Books. ISBN 978-1-4982-9448-5. OCLC 968425905.

=== Edited by ===
- ———, ed. (1998). Understanding Josephus: seven perspectives. Journal for the study of the Pseudepigrapha - Supplement series. Vol. 32. Sheffield, England: Sheffield Academic Press. ISBN 978-1-85075-878-5. OCLC 491447724.
- ———, ed. (2001–2008). Flavius Josephus: Translation and Commentary - General editor of the 14-volume series. Leiden & New York: E.J. Brill.
- ———; Edmondson, J. C.; Rives, J. B., eds. (2005). Flavius Josephus and Flavian Rome. Oxford & New York: Oxford University Press. ISBN 978-0-19-926212-0. OCLC 60666982.

=== Chapters ===
- ——— (1998). "Should any wish to enquire further (Ant. 1.25): the aim and audience of Josephus's Judean antiquities/life". In ——— (ed.). Understanding Josephus: seven perspectives. Journal for the study of the Pseudepigrapha - Supplement series. Vol. 32. Sheffield, England: Sheffield Academic Press. pp. 64–103. ISBN 978-1-85075-878-5. OCLC 491447724.
- ——— (2005). "Figured speech and irony in T. Flavius Josephus". In ———; Edmondson, J. C.; Rives, J. B. (eds.). Flavius Josephus and Flavian Rome. Oxford & New York: Oxford University Press. pp. 244–288. ISBN 978-0-19-926212-0. OCLC 60666982.
