= MASH (game) =

Children's fortune-telling game

MASH is a multiplayer paper-and-pencil game commonly played by children intended to predict one's future. The name is an acronym of "Mansion, Apartment, Shack/Street/Shed/Sewers/Swamp, and House". Additional variations include adding a potential car, future spouse, and ultimate career choice, among the numerous other possible categories.

== Game play for MASH ==
1. The game starts by either player writing out the title MASH at the top of a piece of paper.
2. Both players contribute to writing a list of categories like where they live, how many kids they have, who they marry, and what their job would be.
3. Each player thinks of 3 answers for each category: 2 they want and 1 they don't, and writes them in a column under the category title.
4. Player 2 then begins to draw a swirl on a separate piece of paper. Player 1 says "Stop" at a time they choose after waiting at least 3 seconds, and player 2 stops and draws a line through the swirl from the endpoint to the starting point. They then count how many times the swirl intercepts the line drawn.
  1. Alternatively, player 2 will make tally marks instead of drawing a swirl. When player 1 says 'Stop', player 2 stops drawing marks and counts them.
5. Player 1 or 2 counts each item down the page (starting with the MASH), and crosses off the answer that they land on. For instance, if four lines were counted in the swirl, every fourth answer is crossed off the list. This continues until there is only one item in each category. Each letter in the title is considered an answer and should be crossed off accordingly.
6. The remaining items are considered to determine the Player 1's future while the crossed-out ones will be Player 2's future.

== See also ==
- FLAMES (game)
