= Siege of Yodfat =

Roman siege during First Jewish-Roman War

- Part of Galilee campaign (67) of the First Jewish-Roman War
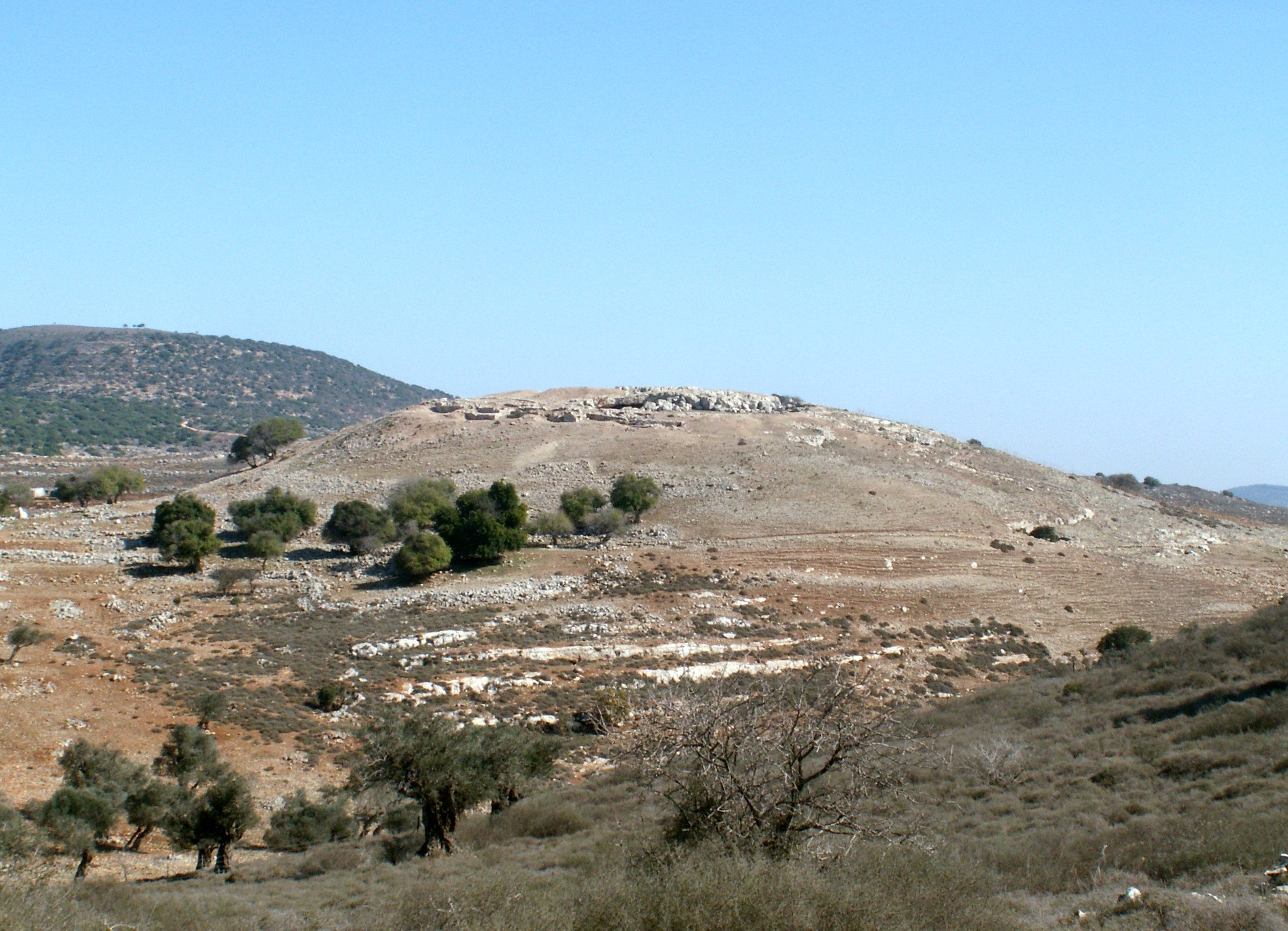
- Hilltop location of ancient Yodfat
Date	24 May – 20 July 67
Location	Galilee, Judaea (modern-day Israel) 32°49′56″N 35°16′39″E
Result	Roman victory

Belligerents
Galilean Jews	Roman Empire

Commanders and leaders
Yosef Ben-Matityahu (Josephus) (POW)	Vespasian

Strength
~42,000, including non-combatants	60,000, including 3 legions, auxiliaries and allies

Casualties and losses
40,000 slain, 1,200 enslaved.	Unknown
- Location within Israel

The siege of Yodfat (Hebrew: יוֹדְפַת, also Jotapata, Iotapata, Yodefat) was a 47-day siege by Roman forces of the Jewish town of Yodfat which took place in 67 CE, during the Great Revolt. Led by Roman General Vespasian and his son Titus, both future emperors, the siege ended with the sacking of the town, the deaths of most of its inhabitants and the enslavement of the rest. It was the second bloodiest battle of the revolt, surpassed only by the Siege of Jerusalem, and the longest except for Jerusalem and Masada. The siege was chronicled by Josephus, who had personally commanded the Jewish forces at Yodfat and was subsequently captured by the Romans.

== Background ==
=== The Great Revolt ===
Judaea had been a troubled region throughout the 1st century CE, torn between different religious sects, struggling to fit into the Roman system and subject to Roman procurators who were often corrupt and repressive. A major rebellion finally erupted in 66 CE and a rebel government established in Jerusalem. When Cestius Gallus, the legate of Syria, failed to take Jerusalem and was then ambushed at Beth Horon, the rebellion spread into the kingdom of Agrippa II, including the Galilee. Emperor Nero thereupon called upon Vespasian, a distinguished veteran of the conquest of Britannia, to suppress the rebellion. In April 67 Vespasian, accompanied by legions X Fretensis and V Macedonica, landed at Ptolemais. There he was joined by Titus, who had arrived from Alexandria at the head of Legio XV Apollinaris, and by the armies of various local allies including that of king Agrippa II. Fielding more than 60,000 soldiers, Vespasian proceeded with an invasion of the Galilee. The Jews had failed to establish an effective field army and Vespasian's campaign was therefore dominated by sieges. The rebel government in Jerusalem had assigned command of both Galilee and the Golan to Yosef Ben Matityahu (later known by the name of Josephus) who, according to Josephus himself, had prior to the Roman invasion fortified 19 of the most important towns of the region, among which were Bersabe, Salamis and Yodfat. After a failed attempt to confront the Roman army at Sepphoris, Josephus had retired to Tiberias, but soon established himself at Yodfat, drawing the Roman legions to the town.

Now Vespasian was very desirous of demolishing Jotapata, for he had gotten intelligence that the greatest part of the enemy had retired thither, and that it was, on other accounts, a place of great security to them.

— Flavius Josephus, The Wars of the Jews 3:141

=== Ancient Yodfat ===
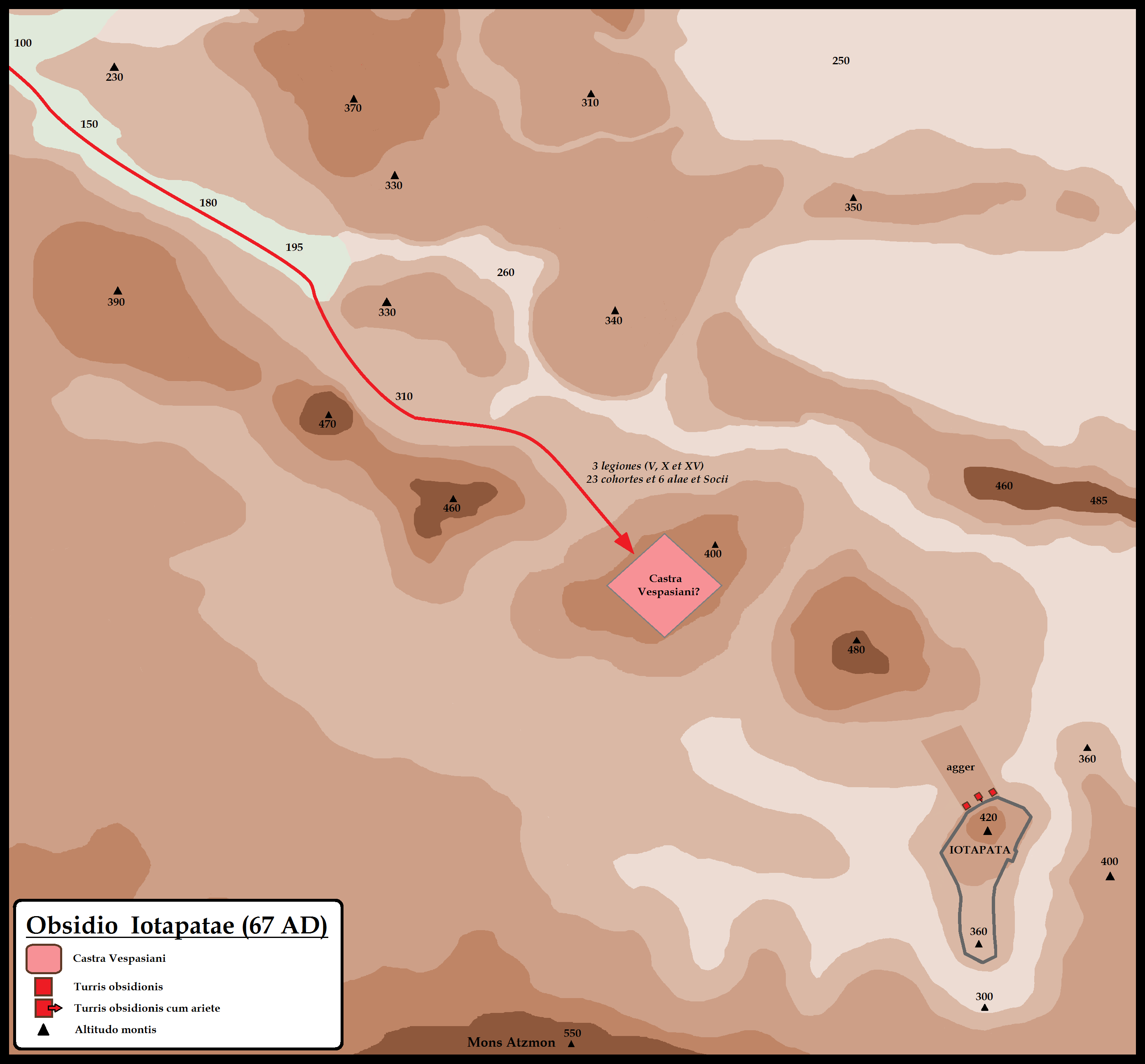
Map of Iotapata' siege

The ancient town of Yodfat is located about 22 km southeast of Acre and 9 km north of Sepphoris, in a topographical setting that contributed greatly to the town's defense. It was positioned on an isolated hill hidden between high peaks, surrounded on three sides by steep ravines and easily accessible only from the saddle to the north.

Archaeological exploration of Yodfat has revealed traces of habitation from the early Hellenistic Period (4th and 3rd centuries BCE) through Roman times, though the town reached its zenith in the 1st century CE, prior to the revolt, when it expanded from the summit of the hill to its southern plateau. The same excavations have also revealed two, perhaps three, phases of fortification. The first, a wall surrounding the summit, was dated to the early 1st century BCE and attributed to the Hasmonean kings who had at the time expanded their influence to the Galilee. These were later bolstered by an additional parallel wall, while a massive tower stood at the center of the site and a small one to the west. The final phase of fortification took place at the turn of the millennium, with the construction of a wall that encompassed both the summit and the southern plateau, an area of roughly 47 dunams (approx. 12 acres). On the accessible northern side of Yodfat this was composed of a case-mate wall, turning into a single solid wall enforced with a few towers beyond the summit. The single wall closely followed the topography of the hill and in some cases directly abutted or incorporated existing buildings, suggesting it was constructed in haste, during stressful times. These may have been the revolt-era fortifications Josephus attributes to himself.

Yodfat, however, suffered from a lack of any local natural source of water. Excavations have revealed the existence of an extensive system of cisterns, both public and private, that were used to collect rain water. While a large quantity of corn had been stored away, Yodfat's dependence on a limited and diminishable supply of water would prove problematic during the Roman siege.

Although undoubtedly inflated, Josephus puts the population of Yodfat on the eve of the siege at over 40,000 people, including refugees.

== Roman siege ==
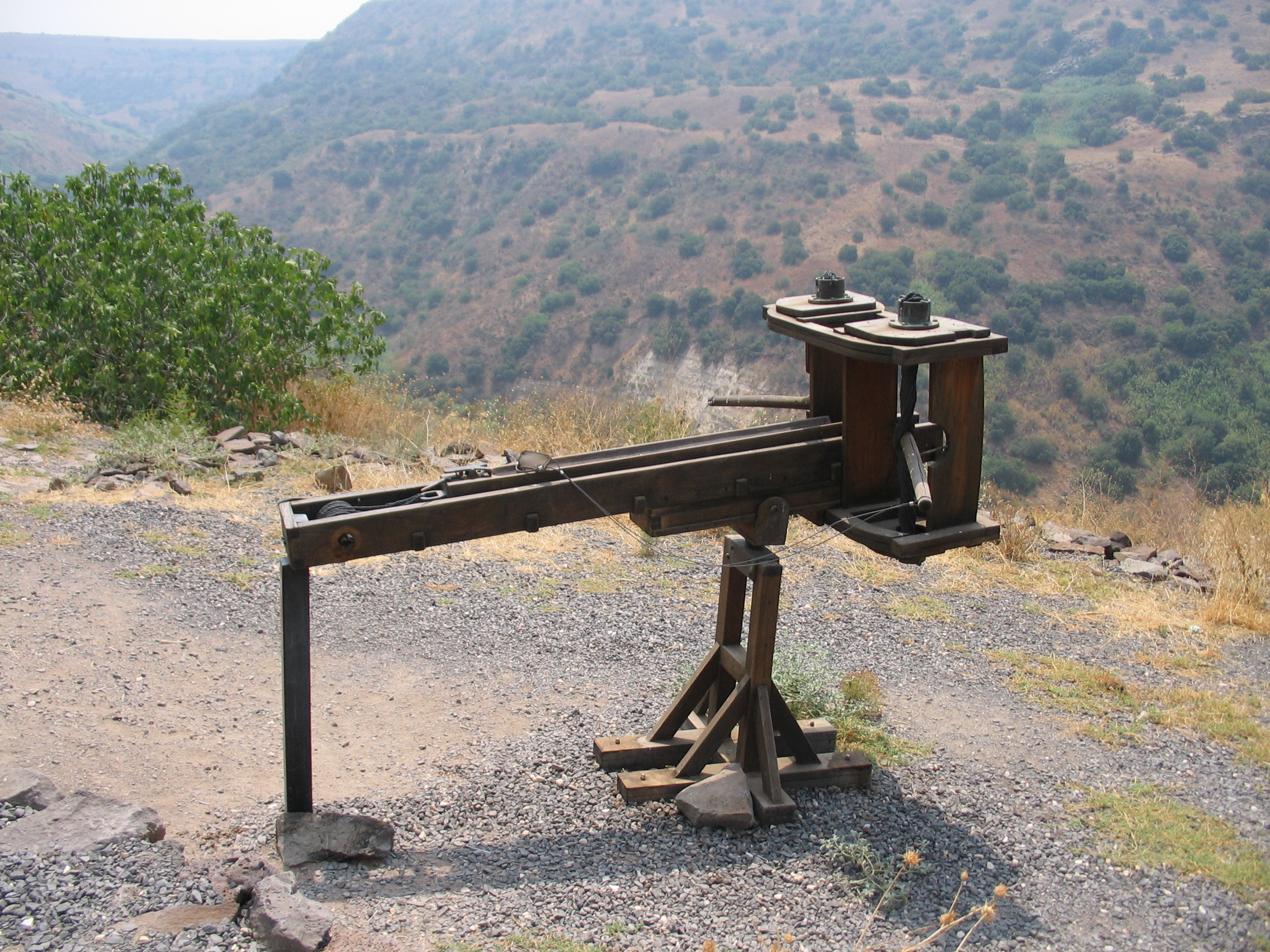
Replica of Roman Ballista at Gamla

In early June 67 a force of 1,000 cavalrymen arrived at Yodfat to seal off the town, followed a day later by the entire Roman army in the region: the Legio V Macedonica, Legio X Fretensis and Legio XV Apollinaris, and auxiliaries consisting of Arab archers and Syrian slingers. Vespasian pitched his own camp north of the town, facing its only accessible side, while his forces surrounded the city. An assault against the wall on the second day of the siege failed, and after several days in which the defenders made a number of successful sorties against his forces, Vespasian decided to prosecute the siege with vigour. The Roman army then began building a siege ramp against the city walls, and when these works were disrupted by the Jews, Vespasian set 160 siege engines, catapults and ballistas, backed by lightly armed troops, slingers and archers, to dislodge the defenders from the walls. These were in turn met with repeated sallies by the besieged, but work on the ramp continued, raising it to the height of the battlements and forcing Jewish commander Yosef Ben-Matityahu (better known as Josephus) to have the walls themselves raised.

Ben-Matityahu had Yodfat's limited water supply rationed before the siege began. The Romans had heard of this and began using their artillery to target water-drawing efforts, hoping to exacerbate an already difficult situation and bring a swift end to the siege. The Jews confounded these expectations by wringing their clothes over the battlements until the walls ran with water, leading the Romans to believe they had a hidden water supply. According to Josephus, this had the double effect of strengthening the Romans' resolve to take the city by force and the defenders' resolve to fight, hoping to die by the sword rather than by thirst or starvation.

With the completion of the assault ramp, Vespasian ordered a battering ram brought up against the wall. Various stratagems were used by the defenders against the ram, including lowering sacks filled with chaff to receive its blows (until these were torn away by the Romans) and sallying forth and setting fire to the ram. Josephus also chronicles an incident in which one of the defenders, renowned for his strength, cast a huge stone on the ram from above, breaking off its head. Nevertheless, the attempts to batter down the wall continued. When Vespasian himself was wounded by a defender's dart, the Romans were so incensed that they continued their bombardment of the wall throughout the night. By morning, a breach had been created, and the Romans were ready to assault the walls. The besieged, however, charged through the breach, and when the Romans attempted to scale the walls, scalding oil was poured down upon them from above, and they were beaten back.

Vespasian's next ploy was to raise the siege ramp even further, and in order to protect his soldier,s he had three siege towers built, each 15m tall. Raining missiles on the defenders, the towers allowed the Roman soldiers beneath to complete their siege works, heightening the ramp until it surpassed the city walls.

=== Fall of Yodfat ===
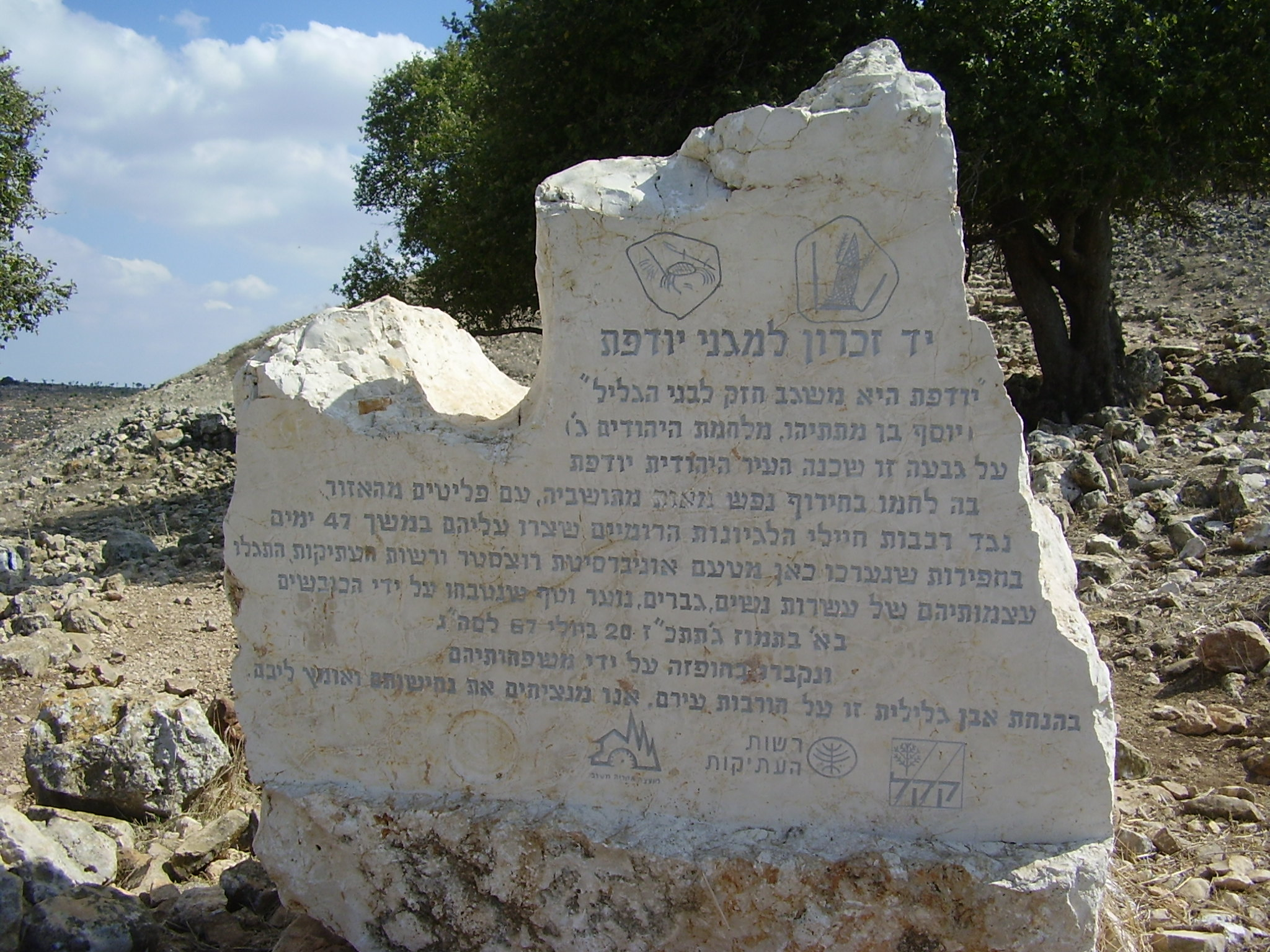
Modern memorial to the defenders of Yodfat

On the 47th day of the siege, the day when the ramp surpassed the walls, a deserter went over to the Romans and disclosed the dire situation within Yodfat. Few defenders had remained, and these, worn out by their perpetual fighting and vigilance, usually slept during the last watch of the night. At dawn on the very next day, the first of Panemus (July 20, 67), a band of Romans reportedly led by Titus himself stealthily scaled the walls, cut the throats of the watch and opened the gates, letting in the entire Roman army. Taken by surprise, the Jews were furthermore confounded by a thick mist, and the Romans quickly took hold of the summit, pursuing the inhabitants down the eastern slope.

And for the Romans, they so well remembered what they had suffered during the siege, that they spared none, nor pitied any, but drove the people down the precipice from the citadel, and slew them as they drove them down; at which time the difficulties of the place hindered those that were still able to fight from defending themselves; for as they were distressed in the narrow streets, and could not keep their feet sure along the precipice, they were overpowered with the crowd of those that came fighting them down from the citadel.

— Flavius Josephus, The Wars of the Jews 3:330

According to Josephus, 40,000 were slain or committed suicide, and 1200 women and infants were taken into slavery, while the Romans suffered but a single fatality. Vespasian ordered the town demolished and its walls torn down. The Romans prohibited the burial of the fallen, and it was only a year or more later that Jews were allowed to return to bury the remains in caves and cisterns.

Yosef Ben-Matityahu had hidden in one of the caves that litter the site, along with 40 other prominent citizens of Yodfat. Although Ben-Matityahu was in favour of surrendering to the Romans, the majority of his comrades opted to kill themselves rather than fall into Roman hands. As suicide is considered sinful, they decided to draw lots to kill each other. Ben-Matityahu and another man, however, were the last to survive, and both resolved to give themselves up. Taken to see the Roman general, Ben-Matityahu prophesied that Vespasian would one day become emperor. Vespasian subsequently spared the rebel leader, who began collaborating with the Romans. At first a slave, he would later be freed and be granted Roman citizenship as Flavius Josephus.

== Archaeology ==
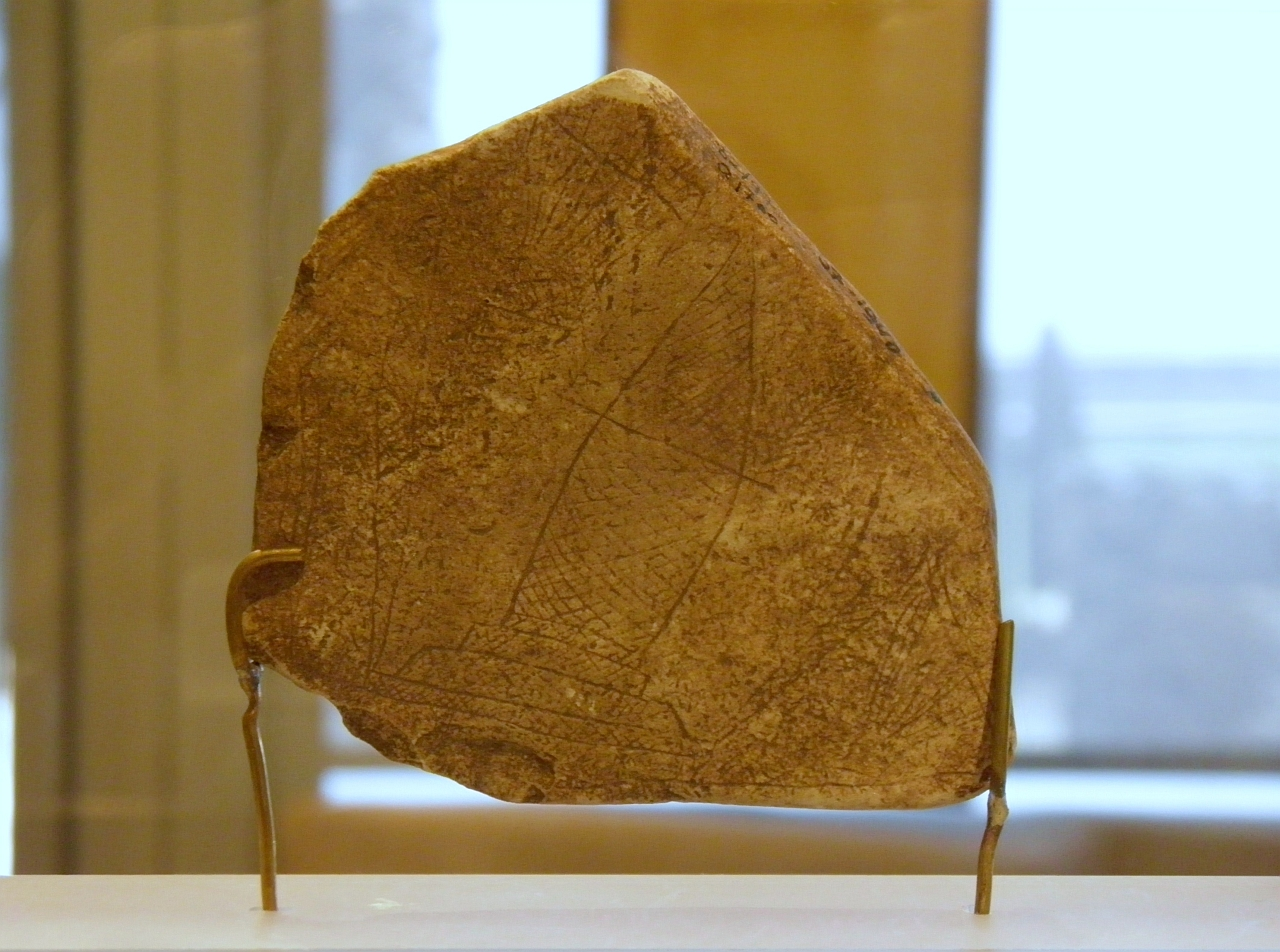
Nefesh stone unearthed at Yodfat (Jotapata)

Josephus' role as leader of the defenders of Yodfat, his subsequent collaboration with the Romans and his servitude to the Flavians have all made his account of the siege of Yodfat suspect. As the sole account of the battle, as well as of many events of the Great Revolt, the credibility of Josephus has been a central subject of historical inquiry.

As the original site of Yodfat had never been resettled nor built over, it provides an almost unparalleled glimpse of both Jewish life at the time and the battle site. Yet although the site of Yodfat had been identified in the mid 19th century, excavations of the ancient town only began with six seasons undertaken between 1992 and 2000. These have revealed that Josephus' description of the events at Yodfat were, to a large extent, accurate. The site shows evidence of hasty fortifications and of a large scale battle which took place. Exploration of the Roman assault ramp as well of the residential areas of the town have produced hundreds of bow and ballista arrowheads, as well as catapult stones, while in the ramp were also found a pair of caligae nails and a large rolling stone. A fill containing a catapult stone in the corner of the northern casemate wall is indicative of attempts at reinforcement against a battering ram. Human bones of all ages were found in every house and cistern, including arms and skulls bearing cut marks from heavy sharp tools. Hundreds, possibly thousands, of people were clearly killed during the battle.

The archaeology of Yodfat also reveals that the fortification of Yodfat cannot be credited to Josephus' effort alone. Furthermore, archaeology is unable to provide insight into many of the details he provides, particularly events surrounding the final fall of Yodfat and his surrender to Vespasian. The figure he provides for the population of Yodfat, and the large number of casualties are clearly inflated. A more realistic figure would place the population of the town on the eve of the siege, including refugees and fighting men, at 7,000 people.

One find of particular interest is an 8 by 11 cm stone slab, found in the residential area on the eastern slope of Yodfat, covered on both sides with scratched drawings made by a pointed tool. One side depicts a building with a triangular roof upon a podium, a small tree and a harp, and is thought to portray a Nefesh (a traditional Judean mausoleum). The other side of the stone features a crab, the astrological symbol of the Hebrew month of Tammuz, on the first day of which Yodfat fell. The stone is believed to have been the work of a besieged Jew anticipating his own impending doom, and its likeness has been etched on a modern memorial to the defenders of Yodfat placed at the foot of the Roman siege ramp.

The Roman ramp in the saddle below the Yodefat wall towers was a twin ramp and where it became steep, ramp infill was held in place by still visible concrete revetment. In 1993 a University of Rochester archaeological team mapped a square kilometer centered on a brass datum placed near the center of Yodefat hill by British surveyors. The mapping project's primary goal was to create a digital elevation model with rendered wire frame model and a map depicting all extant city archaeological features, the siege ramp, entrances to cisterns, an olive press on the lower eastern slope, and niche graves on the slopes below the walls. In addition, potential locations for Roman artillery were identified through analysis of ballista trajectories found archaeologically at the base of the north towers.

== See also ==
- Siege of Gamla
- Josephus problem
- Siege of Masada
- Siege of Numantia
