= Julius Placidus =

Julius Placidus was a Roman military tribune in the 1st century.

During Vespasian's capture of Rome in the Year of the Four Emperors, Placidus dragged the emperor Vitellius out of his hiding place, and led him through the city.
